= Whitton =

Whitton may refer to:

== People ==
- Whitton (singer-songwriter), American singer-songwriter
  - Whitton (EP), 2010
- Charlotte Whitton (1896–1975), Canadian feminist and Mayor of Ottawa
- David Whitton (born 1952), Scottish politician
- Donald Whitton (born 1923), Canadian cellist, and teacher
- Evan Whitton (1928–2018), Australian journalist
- Geoff Whitton (born 1942), Australian rules footballer
- Ivo Whitton (1893–1967), Australian golfer
- John Whitton (1820–1898), Australian rail engineer
- Margaret Whitton (1949–2016), American actress
- Mary Whitton, American computer graphics researcher
- Michael Whitton, American film director
- Nicola Whitton (born 1972), British academic and author
- Steve Whitton (born 1960), English footballer
- Tiffany Whitton (born 1987), American woman missing since 2013
- An English family, of which, to escape the persecution made to the Roman Catholics, John then João Whitton and his wife Apollonia then Apolónia Sabat passed to the Faial Island in the 17th century. He was son of Nicholas Blorent Whitton, Gentleman of the King of England, and wife Anna Irumbath, daughter of Guimine Irumbath of Easthampstead, Berkshire, paternal grandson of John Whitton, native of Oxfordshire, and wife Esther Blorent, daughter of Nicholas Blorent, native of London, Middlesex, and great-grandson by varony of George Whitton of Hensinglon, native of Oxfordshire. John then João Whitton and his wife Apollonia then Apolónia Sabat lived nobly and esteemed by the Portuguese Kings, leaving issue which continued the paternal surname, to which were granted Charts of Arms of succession in the years of 1752 and 1754, with the ones of the mentioned family, which are the following: broken, the first argent, a chevron sable, charged with five roundels argent, the second also argent, three clashing bull heads sable, armed azure, blowing fire through their nostrils; crest: one of the shield's clashing bull head sable, with a roundel argent on the forehead. In Portugal, the surname is also found written Vhitton.

== Places ==
=== Australia ===
- Whitton, New South Wales

=== United Kingdom ===
- Whitton, Scottish Borders, a location in Scotland

==== England ====
- Whitton, County Durham
- Whitton, Herefordshire, a location
- Whitton, Lincolnshire
- Whitton, London
  - Whitton (ward)
- Whitton, Northumberland, a location
- Whitton, Shropshire
- Whitton, Ipswich, Suffolk, a suburb
  - Whitton Ward, Ipswich
- Whitton, Mid Suffolk, Suffolk, a civil parish
- Whitton, Lowestoft, an estate of Lowestoft, Suffolk

==== Wales ====
- Whitton, Powys

=== United States ===
- Whitton, Arkansas, an unincorporated community
- Whitton, California, name prior to 1911 of Planada, California
- Whitton, Illinois, an unincorporated community
- Whitton, Texas, an unincorporated community
