= Witton =

Witton may refer to one of several places in England:

- Witton, Northwich, historic name of an area of Northwich, Cheshire
  - Witton Albion F.C.
- Witton Gilbert, County Durham
- Witton-le-Wear, County Durham
- Witton, an area of Blackburn, Lancashire
- Witton, Broadland, Norfolk, in the civil parish of Postwick with Witton, 5 miles (8 km) east of Norwich
- Witton, North Norfolk, Norfolk, near North Walsham, 19 miles (30 km) north of Norwich
- Witton, Birmingham, West Midlands
- Witton, historic name of East Witton, North Yorkshire
- Witton, historic name of West Witton, North Yorkshire
- Witton, an area of Droitwich, Worcestershire

== People ==
- George Witton (1874-1942), Australian soldier in the Boer War
- Hannah Witton (born 1992), English YouTuber and writer
- Henry Buckingham Witton (1831-1921), Canadian painter and political figure
- Mark P. Witton, British vertebrate palaeontologist
- Richard Witton (1423/4–1428), Master of University College, Oxford

== See also ==
- Whitton (disambiguation)
- Witton Park, County Durham
- Witton Country Park, Blackburn
- Wyton (disambiguation)
