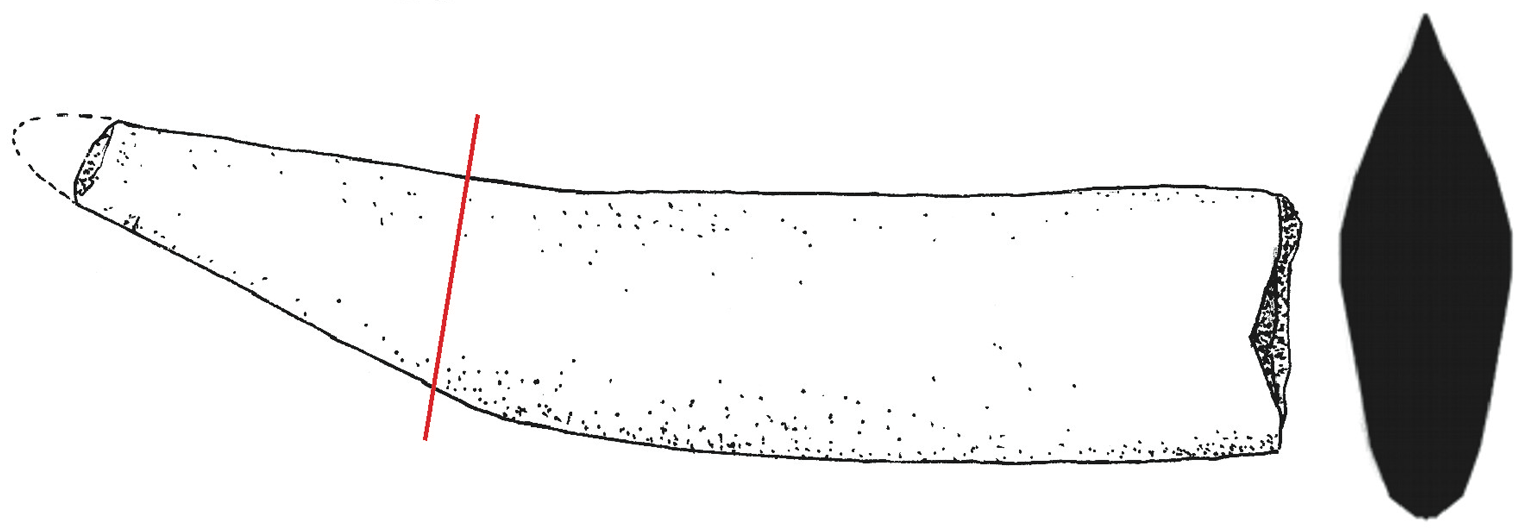
- Illustration of the holotype jaw fragment, with cross-section

Scientific classification
- Kingdom: Animalia
- Phylum: Chordata
- Order: †Pterosauria
- Suborder: †Pterodactyloidea
- Clade: †Azhdarchoidea
- Genus: †Banguela; Headden & Campos, 2015
- Species: †B. oberlii

Binomial name
- †Banguela oberlii Headden & Campos, 2015

Synonyms
- Thalassodromeus oberlii? (Headden & Campos, 2015)

= Banguela =

Banguela Temporal range: Albian

Genus of azhdarchoid pterosaur from the Early Cretaceous

Banguela is a genus of azhdarchoid pterosaur from the Early Cretaceous period (Albian stage) of what is now Brazil. Only one species is known, Banguela oberlii.

== Discovery and naming ==
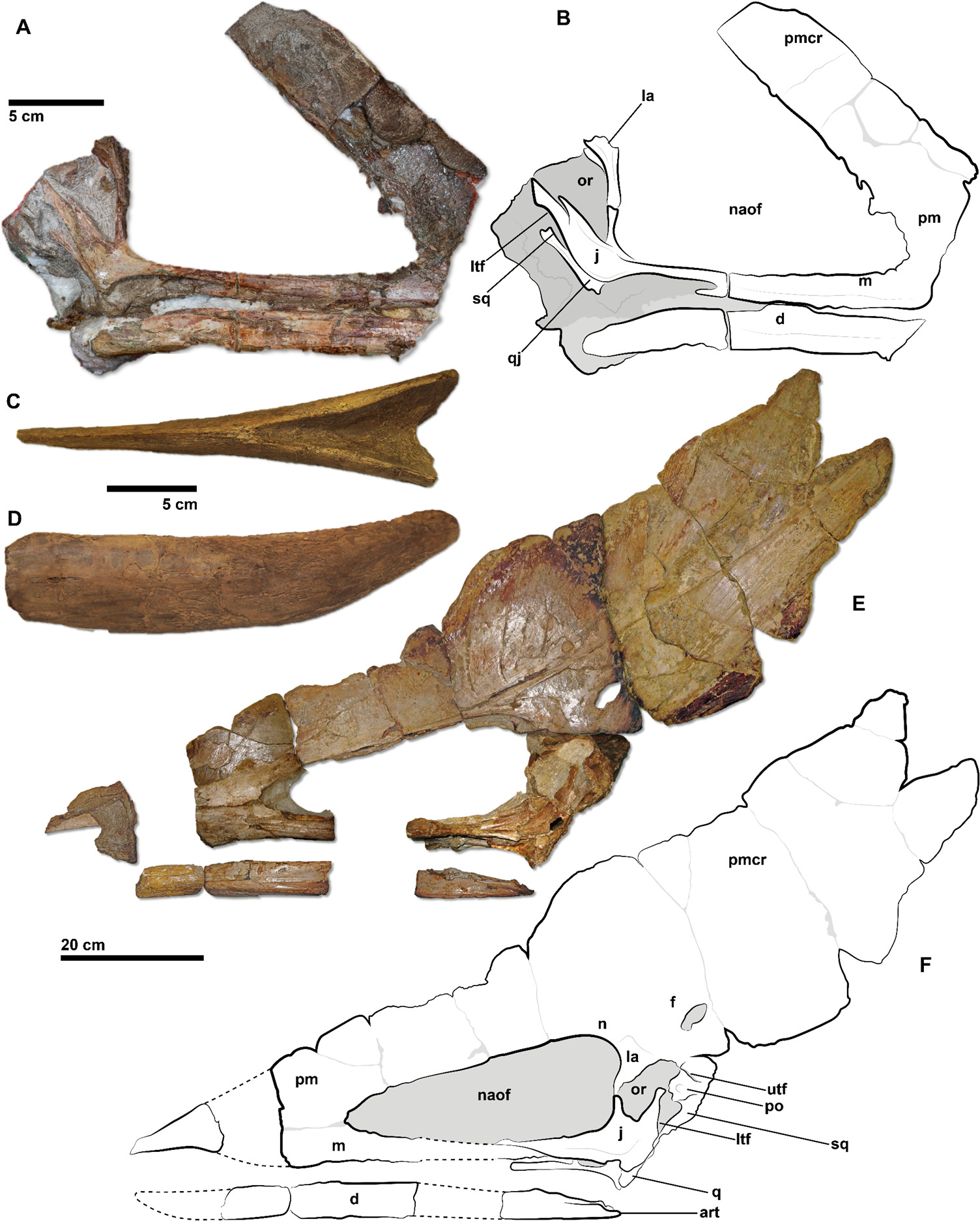
Holotype (C-D) with skulls of Thalassodromeus sethi and Kariridraco

The Swiss collector Urs Oberli acquired a pterosaur jaw fragment from the Chapada do Araripe. In 2005, this was described by André Jacques Veldmeijer and colleagues, and referred to Thalassodromeus sethi.

In 2015, it was named and described by Jaime Headden and Hebert Bruno Nascimento Campos as a separate genus Banguela, with the type species Banguela oberlii. The generic name is a Brazilian Portuguese word for "toothless one", especially used as an affectionate term for elderly women. The specific name honors Oberli.

The holotype, NMSG SAO 251093, was probably found in the Romualdo Formation, also known as the Romualdo Member of the Santana Formation, dating from the Albian. It consists of the symphysis, fused front end, of the lower jaws.

== Description ==
Banguela has an estimated skull length of about 61 centimeters (2 ft) and wingspan of over 3.7 meters (12 ft). The symphysis, with a preserved length of 273 millimeters (10.7 in), curves upwards and has a relatively short depression at its upper rear end. The front upper edge of the symphysis is sharp. The front bottom edge is sharp too but lacks a true crest. There are no teeth or tooth sockets present in the fragment.

== Phylogeny ==
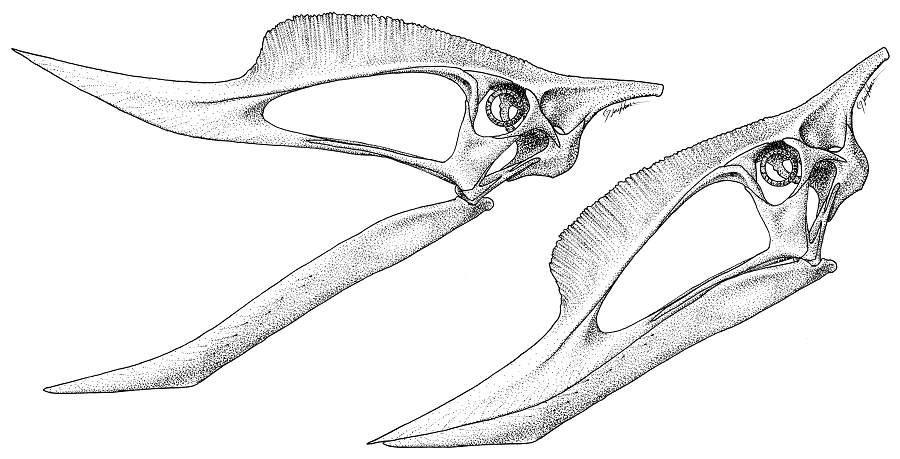
The specimen reconstructed as a dsungaripterid by Jaime Headden

In 2005, Veldmeijer had already noted similarities to Dsungaripterus, but considered the available data to be insufficient to draw any conclusions from this. In 2015, Headden & Campos placed Banguela in the family Dsungaripteridae, in a basal position. The cladogram of their analysis is shown below:

- Azhdarchoidea
  - Dsungaripteridae
    - Banguela oberlii
    - - Dsungaripterus weii
      - Noripterus complicidens
  - Neoazhdarchia
    - - Chaoyangopteridae
      - Azhdarchidae
    - Tapejaroidea
      - Thalassodromidae
      - Tapejaridae

If Banguela were a dsungaripterid pterosaur, it would have been unique among the group due to the presumed total absence of teeth. Other pterosaur groups, such as pteranodontids, nyctosaurids and azhdarchoids, have also lost their teeth, indicating that toothloss might have independently occurred at least four times among pterosaurs. However, because dsungaripterids are occasionally recovered as derived azhdarchoids, it is possible that toothloss has occurred more often, if as an instance of Dollo's Law azhdarchoids should be originally toothless. If there was a large number of cases, Banguela suggests how it developed in most of these: the development of horned rhamphothecae in the jawtips, with progressive tooth rarification until they cease to be useful. Since dsungaripteroids have some of the most specialized teeth of all sauropsids, the toothlessness of Banguela could indicate some degree of divergent specialization.

However, its identity as a dsungaripterid was disputed by other researchers, since no unambiguous traits of dsungaripterids were found in the type specimen. In 2018, a study suggested that Banguela was a species of Thalassodromeus (T. oberlii), and thus it is assigned to the clade Thalassodromidae. In 2020, McPhee and colleagues considered Banguela as a valid genus, and claimed that it belongs to the Chaoyangopteridae.

== See also ==
- List of pterosaur genera
- Timeline of pterosaur research
