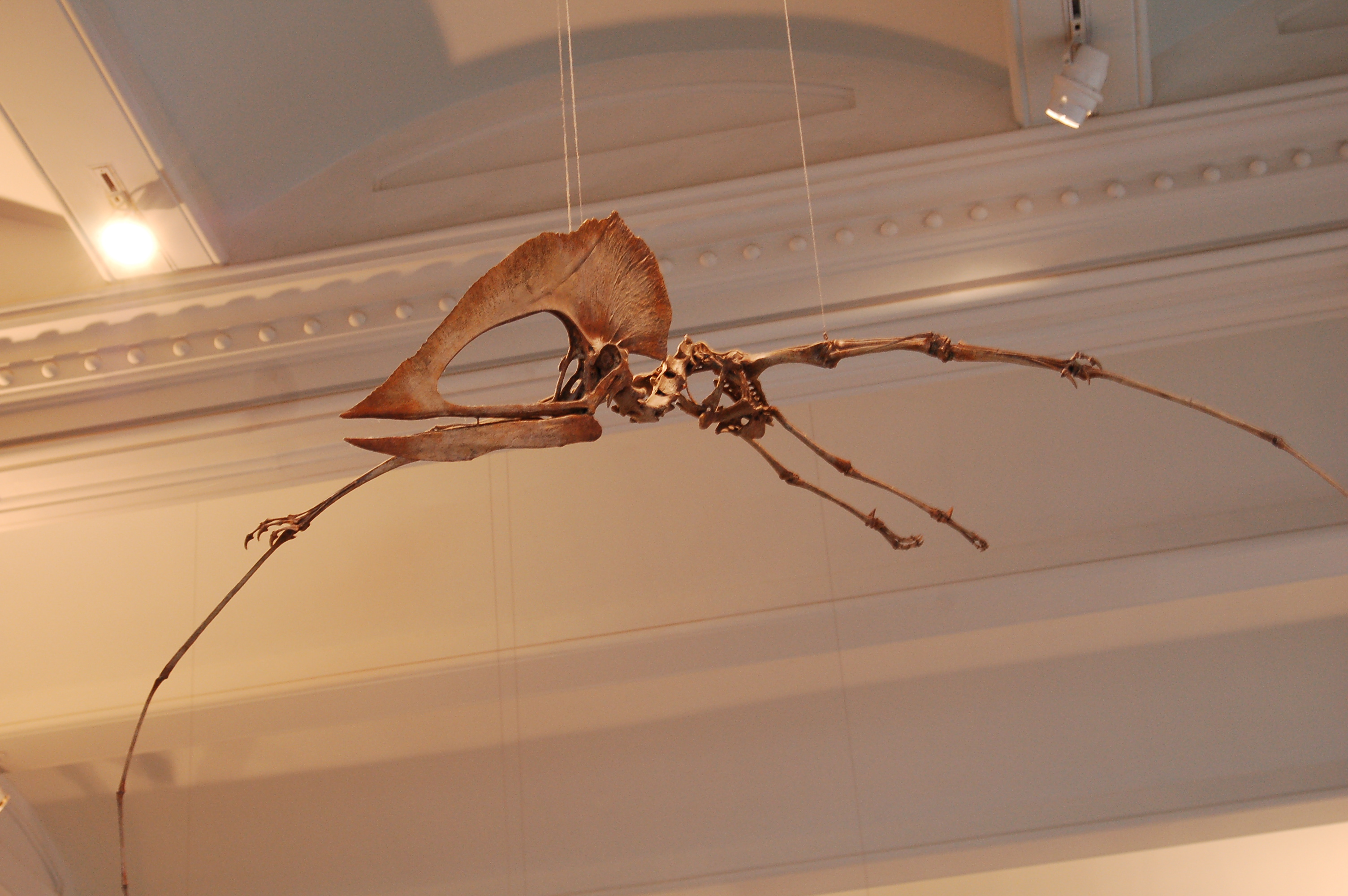
- Replica skeleton of Tupuxuara leonardii

Scientific classification
- Kingdom: Animalia
- Phylum: Chordata
- Class: Reptilia
- Order: †Pterosauria
- Suborder: †Pterodactyloidea
- Clade: †Azhdarchoidea
- Family: †Thalassodromidae; Witton, 2009

Type species
- †Thalassodromeus sethi Kellner & Campos, 2002

Genera
- †Banguela?; †Kariridraco; †Thalassodromeus; †Tupuxuara

Synonyms
- Thalassodrominae Kellner, 2007; Tupuxuaridae Martill, Bechly & Heads, 2007

= Thalassodromidae =

Thalassodromids Temporal range: Albian

Family of azhdarchoid pterosaurs from the Cretaceous period

Thalassodromidae (meaning "sea runners") is a group of azhdarchoid pterosaurs from the Early Cretaceous (Albian) of Brazil. All known definitive members come from the Romualdo Formation of Brazil, which include the type genus Thalassodromeus, as well as Tupuxuara and Kariridraco. Proposals of additional thalassodromid genera from the Late Cretaceous are controversial and have not been supported.

The classification of Thalassodromidae is quite controversial and disputed. It was initially denominated Thalassodrominae, as a subfamily within the group Tapejaridae. However, opposing studies regarding its placement have argued that its members were more closely related to azhdarchids and dsungaripterids, while also elevating it to family level. Though the relationship with tapejarids remains supported by many studies, it has been proposed that it is preferable to retain them as a distinct family for consistency of communication.

== Classification ==
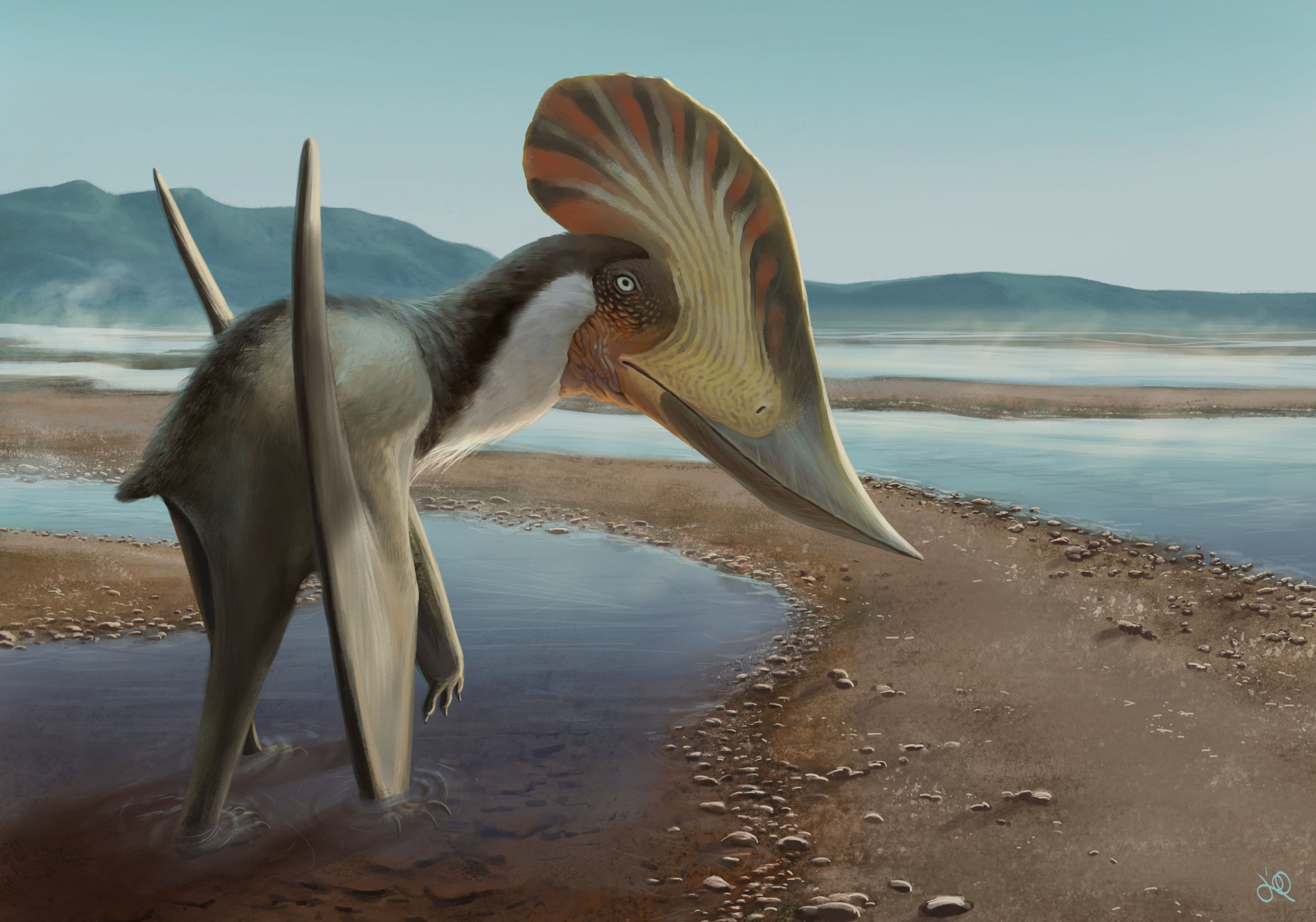
Life reconstruction of thalassodromid Kariridraco

The classification of thalassodromids is controversial. Its initial members included Thalassodromeus and Tupuxuara, which were assigned initially to the family Tapejaridae by Brazilian paleontologists Alexander Kellner and Diógenes de Almeida Campos. In 2007, the subfamily Thalassodrominae was coined by Kellner to group both members within Tapejaridae.

However, a conflicting phylogenetic model emerged arguing that both Thalassodromeus and Tupuxuara were more closely related to the family Azhdarchidae instead of the tapejarids. As early as 2003, paleontologist David Unwin created the group Neoazhdarchia to contain Tupuxuara and Azhdarchidae. This arrangement would later be supported by British paleontologists David Martill and Darren Naish, who deemed Tapejaridae to be paraphyletic (unnatural), and found both Thalassodromeus and Tupuxuara as sister taxa to Azhdarchidae. In 2008, Chinese paleontologist Lü Junchang and colleagues would use the term "Tupuxuaridae" to include both genera in their phylogenetic analysis, finding the group nested within Neoazhdarchia. In 2009, British paleontologist Mark Witton also concurred with the placement of Thalassodromeus and Tupuxuara within Neoazhdarchia. However, he noted that the term Thalassodrominae was created before Tupuxuaridae, so therefore it had naming priority. He elevated Thalassodrominae to family level to satisfy the hierarchy within Neoazhdarchia, thus creating the denomination Thalassodromidae. Phylogenetic analyses by Brian Andres in 2014 and 2021 would support this model, finding a relationship between Thalassodromidae and Dsungaripteridae within Neoazhdarchia, a conclusion also found by a 2018 study.

Many studies, however, have retained the original model of Thalassodrominae as a subfamily of Tapejaridae. In 2011 a study Brazilian paleontologist Felipe Pinheiro and colleagues retained the conception and expanded it to include Chaoyangopterinae, considered by other studies to be a distinct family. Studies by Rodrigo Pêgas and colleagues, Gabriela Cerquiera and colleagues, as well as Kellner himself have continued to followed Kellner's original model, into the 2020s, amongst others. Despite continuing to favour the close relationship of Thalassodromeus and Tupuxuara with Tapejara and its relatives, Pêgas and colleagues began to advocate for the use of Thalassodromidae rather than Thalassodrominae for sake of consistency between studies that do and do not find this relationship. Under this nomenclatural model, they are both families within Tapejaromorpha. Subsequent studies by Pêgas and colleagues would follow this change, though others continue to use the traditional scope of Tapejaridae.

Unwin-model cladogram based on Andres, 2021:

- Azhdarchoidea
  - Tapejaridae
  - Neoazhdarchia
    - Neopterodactyloidea
    - Dsungaripteromorpha
      - Microtuban altivolans
      - - Dsungaripteridae
        - Thalassodromidae
          - - Tupuxuara longicristatus
            - Tupuxuara leonardii
          - Thalassodrominae
            - Thalassodromeus sethi
            - - Alanqa saharica
              - - Argentinadraco barrealensis
                - - Leptostomia begaaensis
                  - Xericeps curvirostris

Kellner-model cladogram based on Pêgas and colleagues, 2023:

- Tapejaroidea
  - Dsungaripteridae
  - Azhdarchoidea
    - Azhdarchomorpha
    - Tapejaromorpha
      - Tapejaridae
        - Caupedactylia
        - Eutapejaria
      - Thalassodromidae
        - - Thalassodromeus sethi
          - Thalassodromeus oberlii
        - - Kariridraco dianae
          - - Tupuxuara longicristatus
            - Tupuxuara leonardii

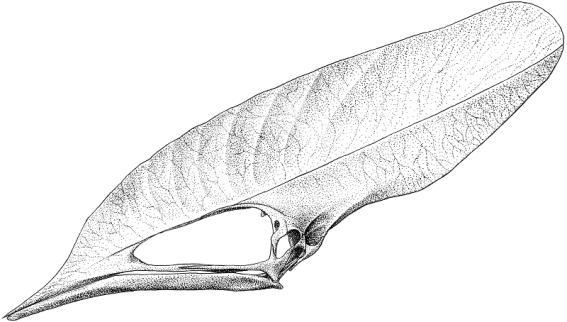
Reconstructed skull of Thalassodromeus; disagreement exists over whether the jaw would downturn as shown

In 2018, paleontologist Nicholas Longrich and colleagues recovered the pterosaurs Aerotitan and Alanqa as thalassodromids, but noted that their fossil remains of are fragmentary, so this assignment was only tentative. A 2021 study by Brian Andres also found Alanqa as a thalassodromid, as well as Argentinadraco, Leptostomia, and Xericeps within Thalassodromidae. He redefined the term Thalassodrominae for all taxa closer to Thalassodromeus than to Tupuxuara, which included all four of this genera. Other studies would not corroborate these results. In a 2022 study, Pêgas and colleagues re-evaluated Aerotitan and rejected its identity as a thalassodromid. Other studies have supported this conclusion. The 2022 study also reinterpreted the holotype of Alanqa as a lower jaw as opposed to an upper one, and found it did not resemble those of thalassodromids. They concluded it to be more closely related to azhdarchids and named a new family Alanqidae for it. A 2023 study by Roy Smith and all authors of the 2018 study would agree with this interpretation, rejecting Alanqa as a thalassodromid (though considering it an azhdarchid rather than an alanqid). They also expressed skepticism at the result of Leptosomia and Xericeps as thalassodromids, noting their fragmentary nature and concluding it was difficult to be certain of their position within Azhdarchoidea. Subsequent studies have placed these two genera and Argentinadraco in Alanqidae, Azhdarchidae, or Chaoyangopteridae.
