= Whittington =

Whittington may refer to:

== Places ==
=== In England ===
- Old Whittington, Derbyshire
- New Whittington, Derbyshire
- Whittington Moor, Derbyshire
- Whittington, Gloucestershire
- Whittington, Lancashire
- Whittington, Norfolk
- Whittington, Northumberland, a civil parish containing Great Whittington
- Whittington, Shropshire
- Whittington, Eccleshall, a location in Eccleshall parish, Staffordshire
- Whittington, Kinver, a location in Kinver parish, Staffordshire
- Whittington, Staffordshire, village and parish near Lichfield
- Whittington, Warwickshire, a location
- Whittington, Worcestershire

=== Elsewhere ===
- Whittington, Victoria, Australia
- Whittington, Illinois, United States

== Railway stations in England ==
- Whittington railway station, in Derbyshire
- Whittington High Level railway station, in Shropshire
- Whittington Low Level railway station, in Shropshire

== Other uses ==
- Whittington (surname)
- Whittington (novel), by Alan Armstrong
- Whittington (opera) (1874) by Jacques Offenbach
- Whittington Hospital in London, England

== See also ==
- Wittington (disambiguation)
