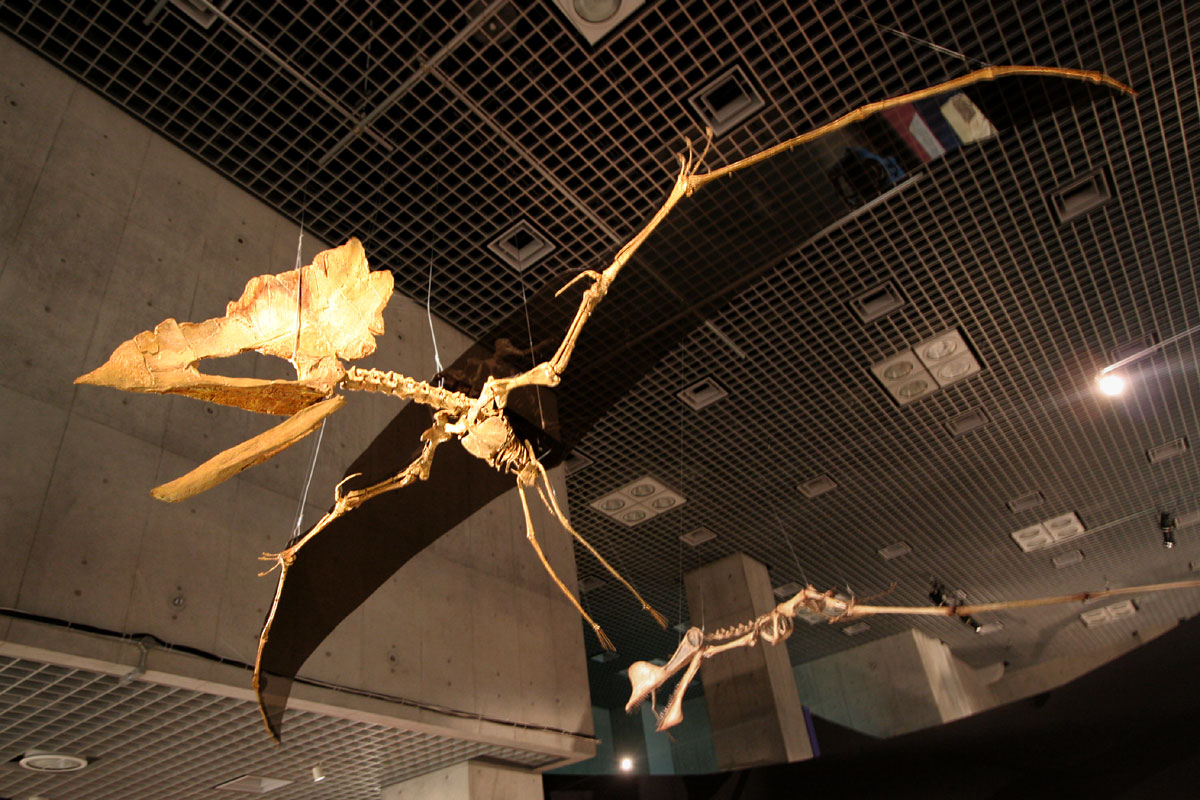
- Reconstructed T. sethi skeleton (front, the postcranium is hypothetical), National Museum of Nature and Science, Tokyo

Scientific classification
- Kingdom: Animalia
- Phylum: Chordata
- Class: Reptilia
- Order: †Pterosauria
- Suborder: †Pterodactyloidea
- Clade: †Azhdarchoidea
- Family: †Thalassodromidae
- Genus: †Thalassodromeus; Kellner & Campos, 2002

Type species
- †Thalassodromeus sethi Kellner & Campos, 2002

Other species
- †T. oberlii? (Headden & Campos, 2015)

Synonyms
- Banguela? Headden & Campos, 2015

= Thalassodromeus =

Thalassodromeus Temporal range: Albian; ~110 Ma

Genus of thalassodromid pterosaur from the Early Cretaceous

Thalassodromeus is a genus of pterosaur that lived in what is now Brazil during the Early Cretaceous period, about a hundred million years ago. The original skull, discovered in 1983 in the Araripe Basin of northeastern Brazil, was collected in several pieces. In 2002, the skull was made the holotype specimen of Thalassodromeus sethi by palaeontologists Alexander Kellner and Diogenes de Almeida Campos. The generic name means "sea runner" (in reference to its supposed mode of feeding), and the specific name refers to the Egyptian god Seth due to its crest being supposedly reminiscent of Seth's crown. Other scholars have pointed out that the crest was instead similar to the crown of Amon. A jaw tip was assigned to T. sethi in 2005, became the basis of the new genus Banguela in 2015, and assigned back to Thalassodromeus as the species T. oberlii in 2018, though other researchers consider it a valid genus. Another species (T. sebesensis) was described in 2015 based on a supposed crest fragment, but this was later shown to be part of a turtle shell.

Thalassodromeus had one of the largest known skulls among pterosaurs, around 1.42 m (4 ft 8 in) long, with one of the proportionally largest cranial crests of any vertebrate. Though only the skull is known, the animal is estimated to have had a wingspan of 4.2 to 4.5 m (14 to 15 ft). The crest was lightly built and ran from the tip of the upper jaw to beyond the back of the skull, ending in a unique V-shaped notch. The jaws were toothless, and had sharp upper and lower edges. Its skull had large nasoantorbital fenestrae (opening that combined the antorbital fenestra in front of the eye with the bony nostril), and part of its palate was concave. The lower jaw was blade-like, and may have turned slightly upwards. The closest relative of Thalassodromeus was Tupuxuara; both are grouped in a clade called Thalassodromidae, which, depending on the study, has been placed either within Tapejaromorpha, closely related to the family Tapejaridae, or within Neoazhdarchia, closely related to the family Dsungaripteridae.

Several theories have been suggested to explain the function of Thalassodromeus's crest, including thermoregulation and display, but it likely had more than one function. The crests of thalassodromids appear to have developed late in growth (probably correlated with sexual maturity) and they may have been sexually dimorphic (differing according to sex). As the genus name implies, Thalassodromeus was originally proposed to have fed like a modern skimmer bird, by skimming over the water's surface and dipping its lower jaws to catch prey. This idea was later criticised for lack of evidence; Thalassodromeus has since been found to have had strong jaw musculature, and may have been able to kill and eat relatively large prey on the ground. The limb proportions of related species indicate that it may have adapted to fly in inland settings, and would have been efficient at moving on the ground. Thalassodromeus is known from the Romualdo Formation, where it coexisted with many other types of pterosaurs, dinosaurs and other animals.

== History of discovery ==
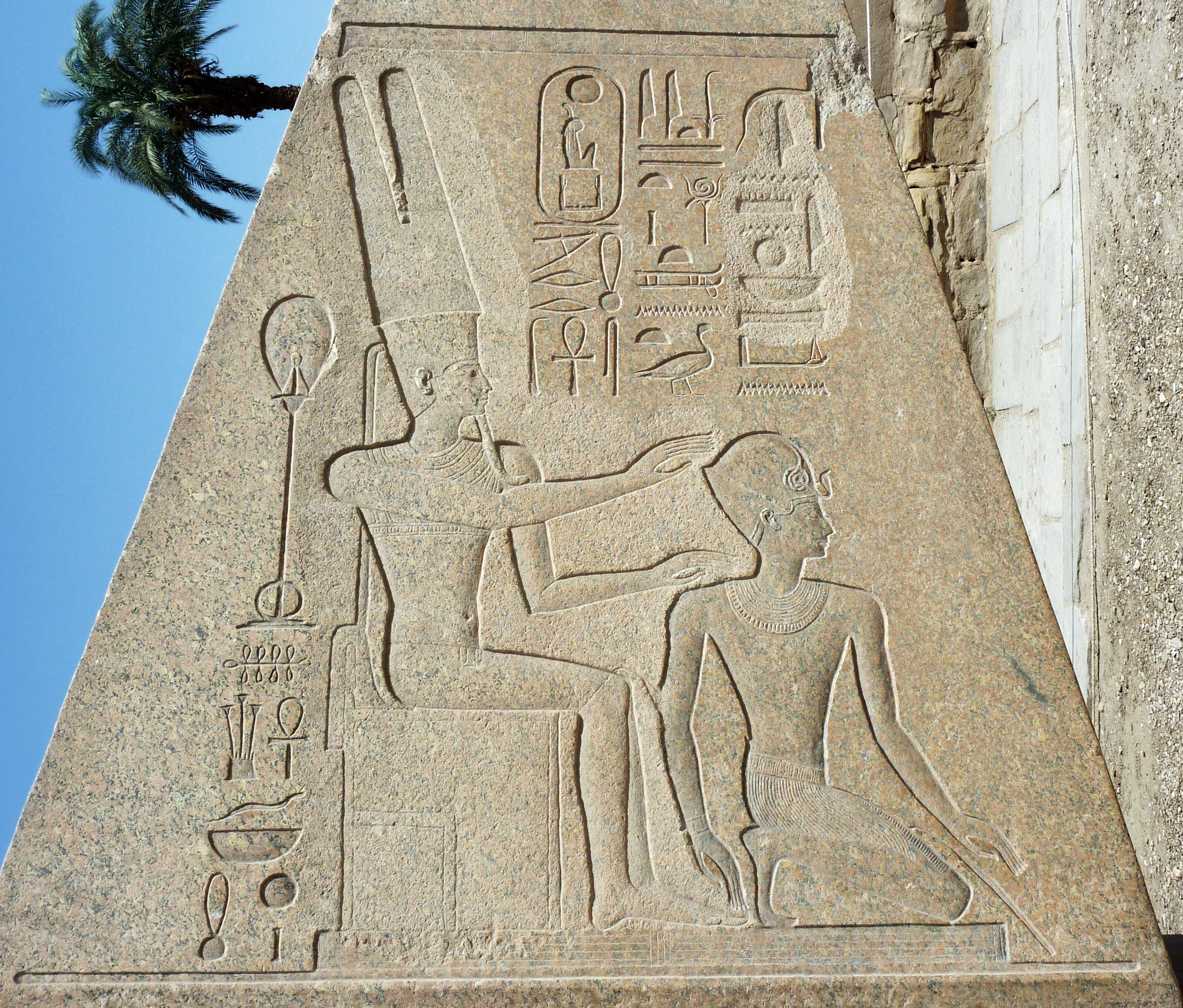
Although T. sethi was named after the god Seth for having a crest similar to his crown, Seth did not wear such a crown; the crest was instead similar to the crown of Amon (left).

The first known specimen of this pterosaur (an extinct order of flying reptiles) was collected in 1983 near the town of Santana do Cariri in the Araripe Basin of northeastern Brazil. Found in outcrops of the Romualdo Formation, it was collected over a long period in several pieces. The specimen (catalogued as DGM 1476-R at the Museu de Ciências da Terra) was preserved in a calcareous nodule, and consists of an almost-complete, three-dimensional skull (pterosaur bones are often flattened compression fossils), missing two segments of the bottom of the skull and mandible and the front of the lower jaw. The left jugal region and right mandibular ramus (half of the mandible) are pushed slightly inward. The skull was first reported in a 1984 Italian book, and preliminarily described and figured in 1990 by palaeontologists Alexander Kellner and Diogenes de Almeida Campos. Although the pieces of skull had been divided between museums in South and North America, they were assembled before 2002.

In 2002, Kellner and Campos described and named the new genus and species Thalassodromeus sethi, skull DGM 1476-R being the holotype specimen. The generic name is derived from the Ancient Greek words θάλασσα, thálassa, '"sea"' and δρομεύς, dromeús, '"runner"', meaning "sea runner" in reference to the animal's supposed skim-feeding behaviour. The specific name refers to the Egyptian god Seth. The specimen was not fully prepared at the time of this preliminary description. The original describers chose the name sethi because the crest of this pterosaur was supposedly reminiscent of the crown worn by Seth, but the palaeontologists André Jacques Veldmeijer, Marco Signore, and Hanneke J. M. Meijer pointed out in 2005 that the crown (with its two tall plumes) was typically worn by the god Amon (or Amon-Ra) and his manifestations – not by Seth.

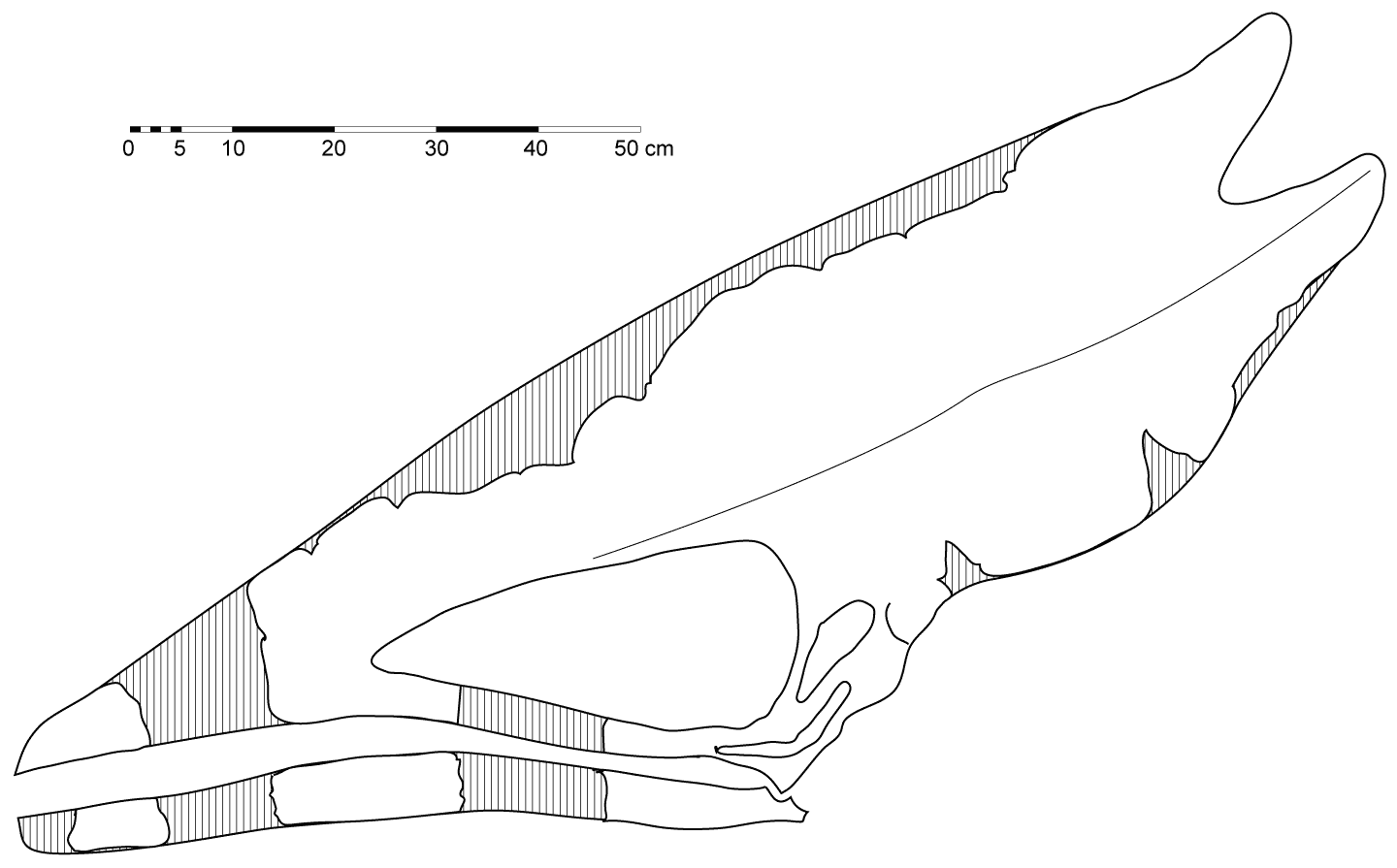
Diagram of the T. sethi holotype skull (hatched lines represent missing parts), based on its initial interpretation

In 2006, palaeontologists David M. Martill and Darren Naish suggested that Thalassodromeus was a junior synonym of the related genus Tupuxuara, which was named by Kellner and Campos in 1988 based on fossils from the same formation. In the view of Martill and Naish, the differences between these genera (including two species of Tupuxuara, T. longicristatus and T. leonardii) were due to ontogeny (changes during growth) and compression of the fossils; Thalassodromeus was simply an older, larger, and better-preserved individual. This idea was rejected by Kellner and Campos in 2007, who pointed out these species had differences in features other than their crests. They also noted that one specimen of Tupuxuara had a larger skull than Thalassodromeus (measured from the tip of the premaxilla to the back of the squamosal bone), despite Martill and Naish's contention that the latter was an older individual. Kellner and Campos' view has since been accepted by other researchers, including Martill and Naish.

=== Assigned and formerly assigned species ===
Veldmeijer and colleagues assigned the front part of a mandible collected from the same formation to T. sethi in 2005. They concluded that although the two specimens differed in several details, the differences were not significant enough to base a new species on the mandible, and that the new specimen filled in the gap of Kellner and Campos' T. sethi skull reconstruction. Palaeontologists Jaime A. Headden and Herbert B. N. Campos coined the new binomial Banguela oberlii, based on their reinterpretation of the jaw tip as belonging to a toothless member of the family Dsungaripteridae, in 2015. The generic name is Portuguese for "toothless" and the specific name honours private collector Urs Oberli, who had donated the specimen to the Naturmuseum St. Gallen (where it is catalogued as NMSG SAO 25109). Headden and Campos interpreted the tip of T. sethi's lower jaw as downturned; this and other features distinguished it from Banguela.

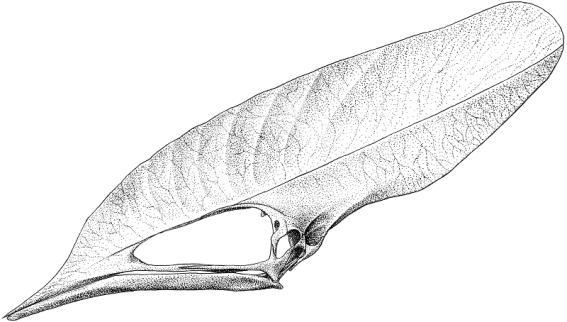
Reconstruction of the T. sethi skull, showing the possible extent of the undamaged crest and downturned jaws proposed by Headden, but not supported by Pêgas and colleagues

In their 2018 re-description of the further-prepared T. sethi holotype skull, palaeontologists Rubi V. Pêgas, Fabiana R. Costa, and Kellner assigned B. oberlii back to Thalassodromeus while recognising it as a distinct species, and thereby created the new combination T. oberlii. Pêgas and colleagues also rejected the theory that the lower jaw of T. sethi was downturned, and reinterpreted the frontmost piece of the lower jaw to have connected directly with the subsequent piece (with no gap). In 2020, palaeontlogist James McPhee and colleagues considered Banguela a valid genus, and instead classified it as a member of the family Chaoyangopteridae, and did not find a dsungaripterid identity well-supported. The palaeontologist Felipe L. Pinheiro and colleagues reiterated that T. oberlii belonged in Thalassodromeus in 2025.

In 2015 palaeontologists Gerald Grellet Tinner and Vlad A. Codrea named a new species, T. sebesensis, based on what they interpreted as part of a cranial crest in a concretion found near the Sebeș River in Romania. The authors said that this would extend the range in time and space for the genus Thalassodromeus considerably, creating a 42-million-year gap between the older South American species and the younger European species. Palaeontologist Gareth J. Dyke and a large team of colleagues immediately rejected the pterosaurian identification of the T. sebesensis fossil, instead arguing that it was a misidentified part of a plastron (lower shell) of the prehistoric turtle Kallokibotion bajazidi (named in 1923). The idea that the fragment belonged to a turtle had been considered and rejected by Grellet-Tinnera and Codrea in their original description. Grellet-Tinnera and Codrea denied the turtle identity suggested by Dyke and colleagues, noting that those researchers had not directly examined the fossil.

== Description ==
Size of T. sethi (shown from above and the side), compared to a human

The holotype (and only known skull) of Thalassodromeus sethi is one of the largest pterosaur skulls ever discovered. The entire skull is estimated to have been 1.42 m (4 ft 8 in) long; the bones were fused together, indicating adulthood. Based on related pterosaurs, its wingspan was 4.2 to 4.5 m (14 to 15 ft), making Thalassodromeus the largest known member of its clade, Thalassodromidae. Of similar proportions, its skull was more heavily built than that of its relative Tupuxuara. Although the postcranial skeleton of Thalassodromeus is unknown, relatives had unusually short and blocky neck vertebrae, with well-developed front and hind-limbs that were almost equal in length (excluding the long wing-finger). The hindlimbs were eighty percent that of the forelimb length, a unique ratio among pterodactyloids (short-tailed pterosaurs). As a pterosaur, Thalassodromeus was covered with hair-like pycnofibres and had extensive wing membranes (which were extended by the wing finger).

The skull of T. sethi had a streamlined profile, especially from the tip of the snout to the front edge of the nasoantorbital fenestra (opening which combined the antorbital fenestra in front of the eye with the bony nostril). The most conspicuous feature of the skull was the large crest, which ran along the upper edge from the tip of the snout and beyond the occiput at the back of the skull, almost doubling the length and height of the skull. With the exception of the pterosaur Tupandactylus imperator (whose crest consisted mainly of soft tissue), T. sethi had the proportionally largest cranial crest of any known vertebrate (75 percent of the skull's side surface). The crest was mainly formed by the premaxillae (the frontmost snout bones), frontal bones, parietal bones, and part of the supraoccipital bone. The premaxillae formed most of the crest, extending to its back, and contacted the frontoparietal part of the crest by a straight suture (a distinct feature of this species). The crest varied from 1 to 10.5 mm (0.039 to 0.413 in) in thickness; it thickened at the contact between the premaxillae and the frontoparietal part, and became gradually thinner toward the top and back (except for the lower part behind the occiput, where it had a thick base).

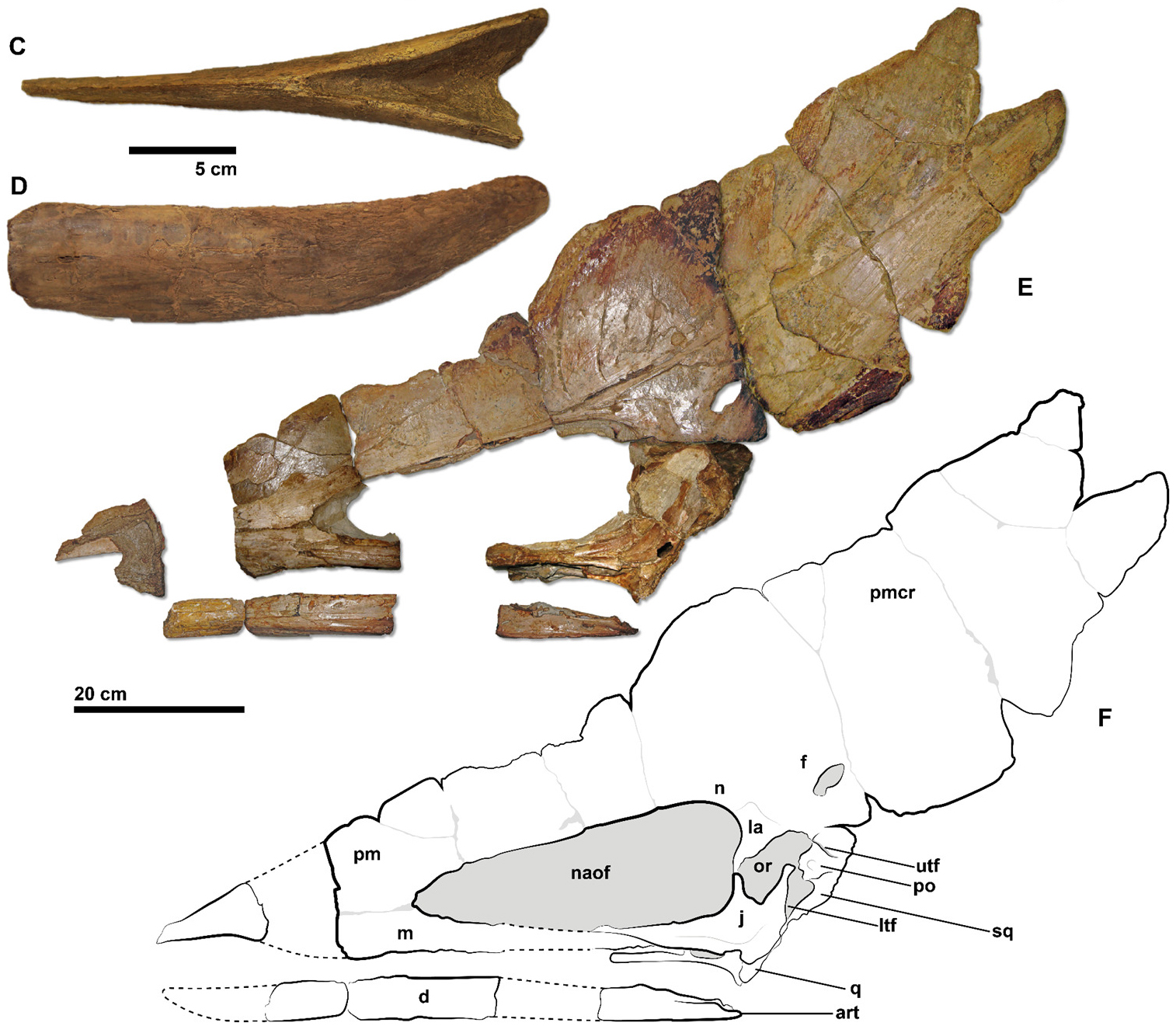
Holotypes of T. oberlii (cast, C is from above, D from the left) and T. sethi (E is from the left, F is a diagram of same)

Despite its size, the crest was lightly built and essentially hollow; some areas indicate signs of skeletal pneumatisation and a well-developed trabecular system uniting the bones. The crest's surface had a system of channels of varying size and thickness, probably the impressions of extensive blood vessels. A small, 46 mm (1.8 in) opening was present above the orbit (eye socket), piercing the basal part of the crest; such a feature is unknown in other pterosaurs, and does not appear to be due to damage. The margins of the opening are smooth, and the inner border has fenestration connecting it to the inner structure of the crest. The back of the crest ended in a prominent V-shaped notch, a unique feature of this species. Although other parts of the crest have V-shaped breaks, the V shape at the end does not appear to have been due to breakage; the margins of the bone can be seen there, still encased by matrix. The crest probably had a keratinous (horny) covering and may have been extended by soft tissue in some areas, but the extent of this is unknown.

The upper jaw of T. sethi was primarily composed of premaxillae and maxillae; the suture which formed the border between these bones is not visible. As in all members of its clade, the jaws were edentulous (toothless). The rostrum (snout) was 650 mm (26 in) long from the tip of the premaxilla to the joint where the quadrate bone of the skull connected with the articular bone of the lower jaw. The front of the premaxillae had sharp upper and lower edges, unique to this species. As in related genera, the nasoantorbital fenestra was comparatively large; it was 650 mm (26 in) long and 200 mm (7.9 in) high, which was 71 percent of the skull length (excluding the crest). The lacrimal bone, which separated the orbit from the nasoantorbital fenestra, was vertically elongated and higher than the upper surface of the orbit (in contrast to the condition seen in pterodactyloids with smaller nasoantorbital fenestrae). The orbit was slender and compressed from front to back compared to Tupuxuara and tapejarids, but similar to some of them in being more than half the height of the nasoantorbital fenestra. The orbit was positioned lower than the upper margin of the nasoantorbital fenestra, and therefore very low on the skull. Although the bones bordering the lower temporal fenestra (an opening behind the orbit) were incomplete, it appears to have been elongated and slit-like (as in Tupuxuara and Tapejara).

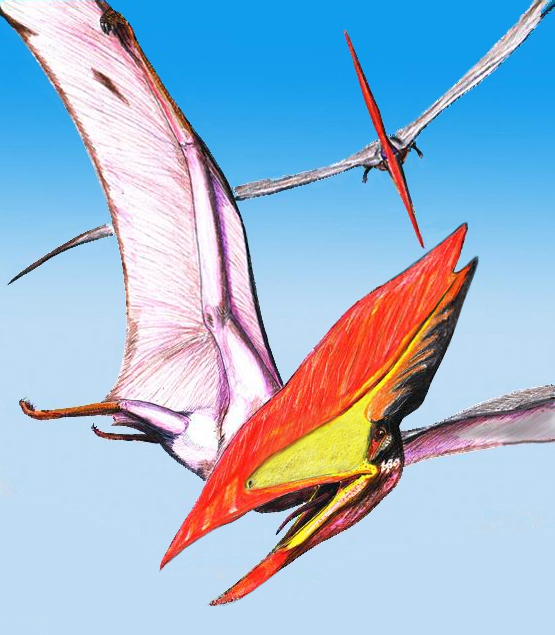
Life restoration of a T. sethi pair in flight

The palatal area at the tip of T. sethi's snout was a sharp ridge, similar to the keel seen on the upper surface of the mandibular symphysis where the two halves of the lower jaw connected. Small slit-like foramina (openings) on the lower side edges of the ridge indicate that it had a horny covering in life, similar to Tupandactylus. The lower edge of the area was somewhat curved, which probably created a small gap when the jaws were closed. Further back, immediately in front of the nasoantorbital fenestra, the palatal ridge became a strong, blunt, convex keel. This convexity fit into the symphyseal shelf at the front end of the lower jaw, and they would have tightly interlocked when the jaws were closed. The palatal ridge ended in a strongly concave area unique to this species. The postpalatine fenestrae (openings behind the palatine bone) were oval and very small, differing from those of related species. The ectopterygoid (bone on the side of the palate) had large, plate-like sides, and was well-developed compared to related species. The supraoccipital bone, which formed the hindmost base of the cranial crest, had muscle scars at its upper end (probably corresponding to the attachment of neck muscles).

Although the lower jaw of T. sethi is incomplete, its total length is estimated at 670 mm (26 in) – 47 percent of which was occupied by the mandibular symphysis. The tip of the mandible is missing, but its front surface indicates that it might have been turned slightly upwards as in T. oberlii (the possible second species of Thalassodromeus, or possibly a different genus (Banguela) which is known only from a jaw tip). The symphyseal shelf, the upper surface of the symphysis, extended for 170 mm (6.7 in) and had a flat surface. Seen from above, the side edges of this area were tall and formed a sharp margin. Near the front end of the symphysis, the edges which formed the margins became broader towards the front of the shelf until they met and fused. The upper and lower surfaces of the jaw at the front of the shelf were keeled (the upper keel more robust and starting before the lower), which gave the symphysis a blade-like shape. The lower keel became deeper towards the front of the jaw, giving the impression that the jaw deflected downwards; it was actually straight, except for the (perhaps) upturned tip. The mandibular fossae (depressions) at the back of the upper jaw were deeper and broader than usual in pterodactyloids, creating large surfaces for the lower jaw to articulate with. The possible species T. oberlii differed from T. sethi and other relatives by the upper surface of its mandibular symphysis being slightly shorter than the lower surface, and was further distinguished from T. sethi by the upper edge of the symphysis being much sharper than the lower. The two species shared features such as the compression of the symphysis sideways and from top to bottom, the sharp keel at the upper front of the symphysis, and the small groove running along the upper surface of the shelf.

== Classification ==
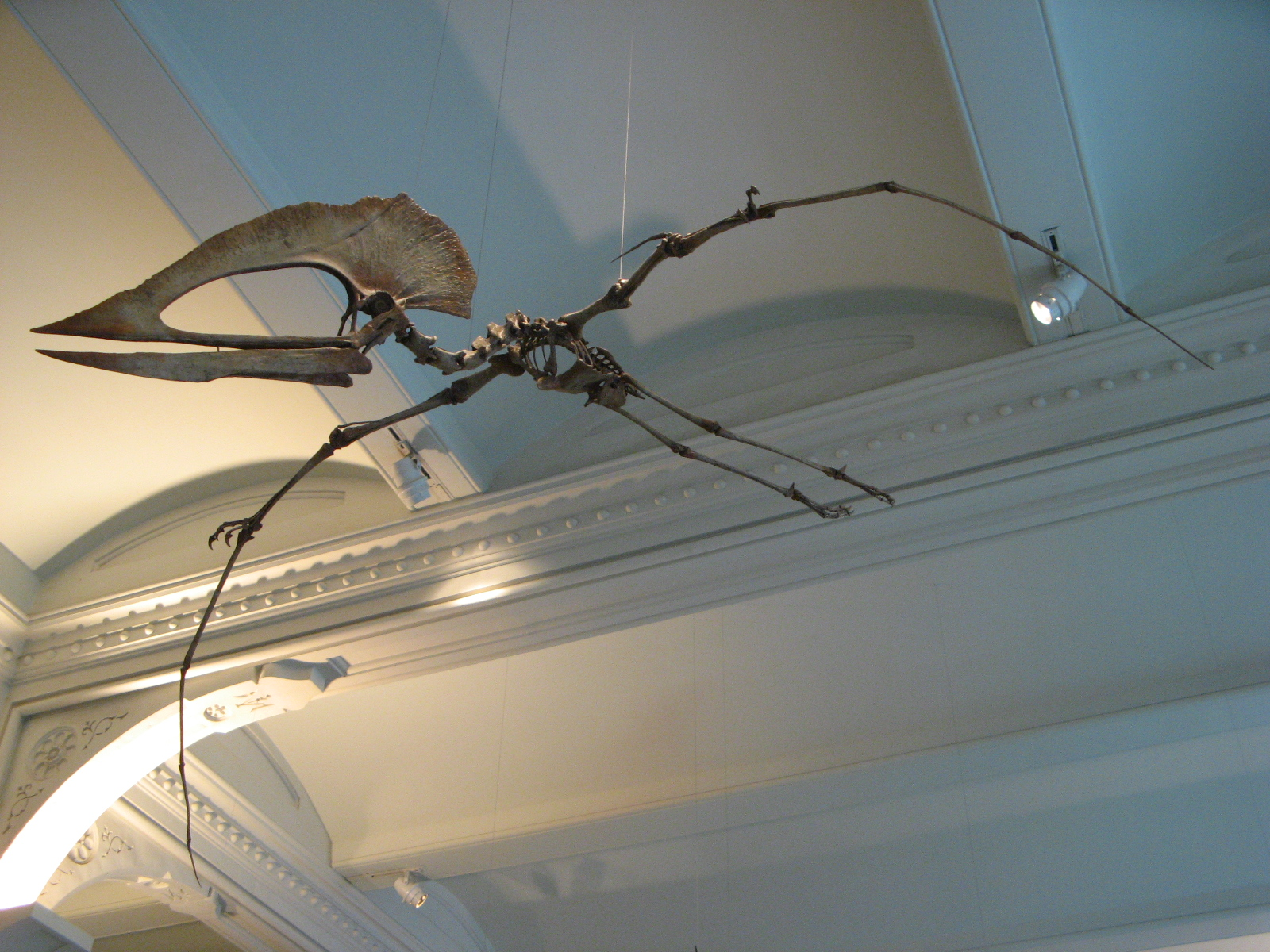
Reconstructed skeleton of the related thalassodromid Tupuxuara in the American Museum of Natural History

The classification of Thalassodromeus and its closest relatives is one of the most contentious issues regarding their group. Kellner and Campos originally assigned Thalassodromeus to the family Tapejaridae, based on its large crest and large nasoantorbital fenestra. Within this clade, they found that it differed from the short-faced genus Tapejara but shared a keel on the palate with Tupuxuara. Kellner elaborated on the relationships within Tapejaridae in 2004, and pointed out that Thalassodromeus and Tupuxuara also shared a crest consisting primarily of bone; the crest had a large component of soft tissue in other members of the group.

Martill and Naish considered Tapejaridae a paraphyletic (unnatural) group in 2006, and found Tupuxuara (which included Thalassodromeus in their analysis) to be the sister taxon to the family Azhdarchidae. This clade (Tupuxuara and Azhdarchidae) had been named Neoazhdarchia by palaeontologist David Unwin in 2003, an arrangement Martill and Naish concurred with. According to Martill, features uniting members of Neoazhdarchia included the presence of a notarium (fused vertebrae in the shoulder region), the loss of contact between the first and third metacarpals (bones in the hand), and very long snouts (more than 88% of the skull length). Kellner and Campos defended the validity of Tapejaridae in 2007, dividing it into two clades: Tapejarinae and Thalassodrominae, the latter containing Thalassodromeus (the type genus) and Tupuxuara. They distinguished thalassodromines by their high nasoantorbital fenestrae and the bony part of their crests beginning at the front of the skull and continuing further back than in other pterosaurs.

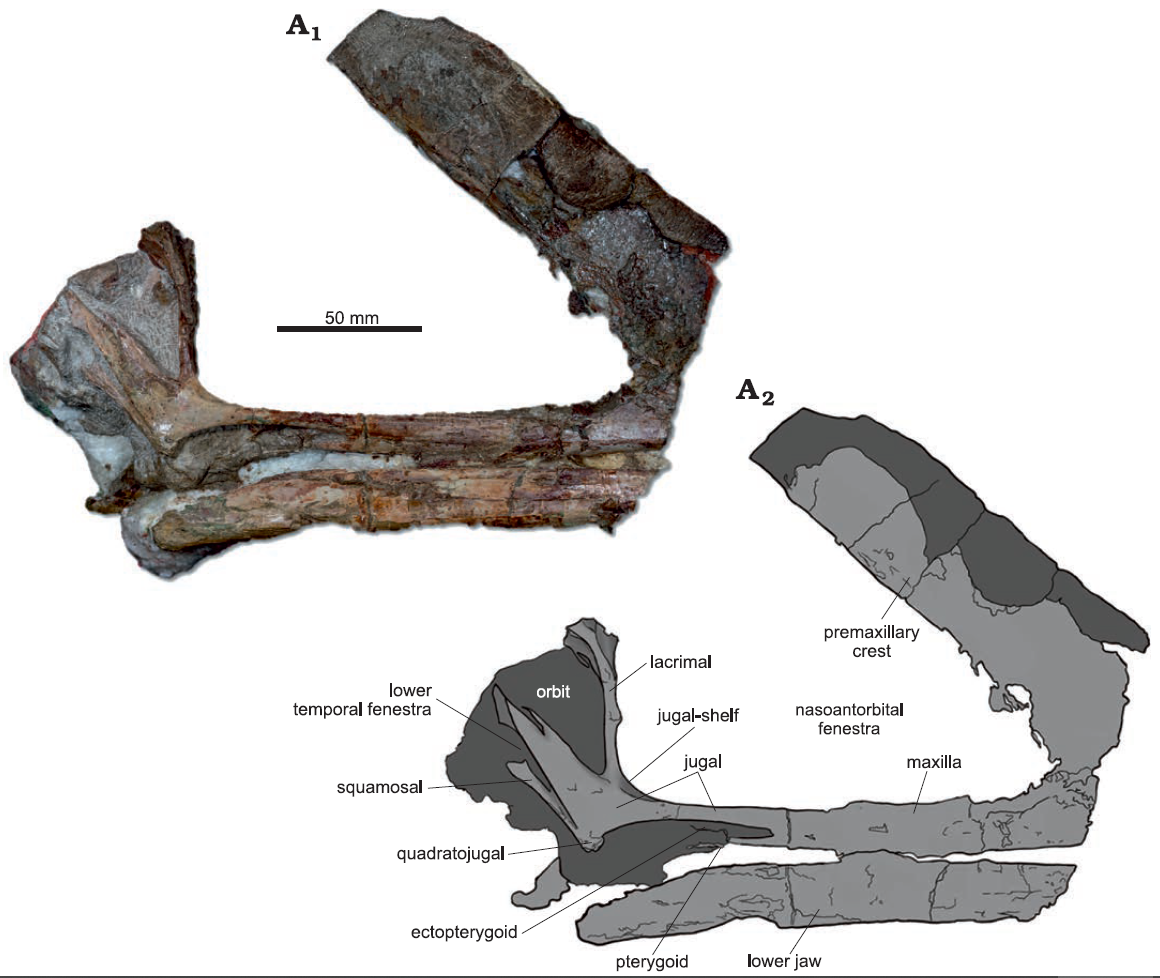
Incomplete holotype skull of the related Kariridraco

The interrelationship of these clades within the larger clade Azhdarchoidea remained disputed, and the clade containing Thalassodromeus and Tupuxuara had received different names from different researchers (Thalassodrominae and Tupuxuaridae). Palaeontologist Mark Witton attempted to resolve the naming issue in 2009, noting that the name "Tupuxuaridae" (first used in the vernacular form "tupuxuarids" by palaeontologist Lü Junchang and colleagues in 2006) had never been validly established and Thalassodrominae should be the proper name (although it was bestowed a year later). Witton further converted the subfamily name Thalassodrominae into the family name Thalassodromidae, and considered the clade part of Neoazhdarchia.

A 2011 analysis by Pinheiro and colleagues upheld the grouping of the clades Tapejarinae and Thalassodrominae in the family Tapejaridae, joined by the Chaoyangopterinae. This arrangement of Thalassodrominae and Tapejarinae would later be kept by Pêgas and colleagues in their 2018 analysis, but they acknowledged that the subject was still controversial. Conversely, a 2018 study by palaeontologist Nicholas Longrich and colleagues instead found the family Thalassodromidae to group with dsungaripterids, forming the clade Dsungaripteromorpha within Neoazhdarchia (defined as the most inclusive clade containing Dsungaripterus weii but not Quetzalcoatlus northropi). In 2021, palaeontologist Gabriela M. Cerqueira and colleagues found their new genus Kariridraco to be the sister taxon of Thalassodromeus and Tupuxuara.

In 2023, having considered that the clade containing Thalassodromeus and Tupuxuara has received two different denominations throughout the years (Thalassodromidae and Thalassodrominae), palaeontologist Rubi Pêgas and colleagues argued that despite the disagreements between the position of said clade within Azhdarchoidea, the species contained within it have almost always been consistent. Therefore, they deemed the difference in naming pattern undesirable. They favored the denomination Thalassodromidae, in order to have consistency with other studies that used the same name. In their analysis, they corroborated the close relationship between thalassodromids and the family Tapejaridae, following the classification model established by Kellner. They included both families within the larger group Tapejaromorpha (defined as the most inclusive clade containing Tapejara wellnhoferi but not Azhdarcho lancicollis). Additionally, they also found T. oberlii to belong to Thalassodromeus.

Cladogram based on Longrich and colleagues, 2018:

- Azhdarchoidea
  - Tapejaromorpha
  - Neoazhdarchia
    - Neopterodactyloidea
    - Dsungaripteromorpha
      - Dsungaripteridae
      - Thalassodromidae
        - - Tupuxuara longicristatus
          - Tupuxuara leonardii
        - - Thalassodromeus sethi
          - - Alanqa saharica
            - Aerotitan sudamericanus

Cladogram based on Pêgas and colleagues, 2023:

- Tapejaroidea
  - Dsungaripteridae
  - Azhdarchoidea
    - Azhdarchomorpha
    - Tapejaromorpha
      - Tapejaridae
        - Caupedactylia
        - Eutapejaria
      - Thalassodromidae
        - - Thalassodromeus sethi
          - Thalassodromeus oberlii
        - - Kariridraco dianae
          - - Tupuxuara longicristatus
            - Tupuxuara leonardii

== Palaeobiology ==
=== Crest function ===
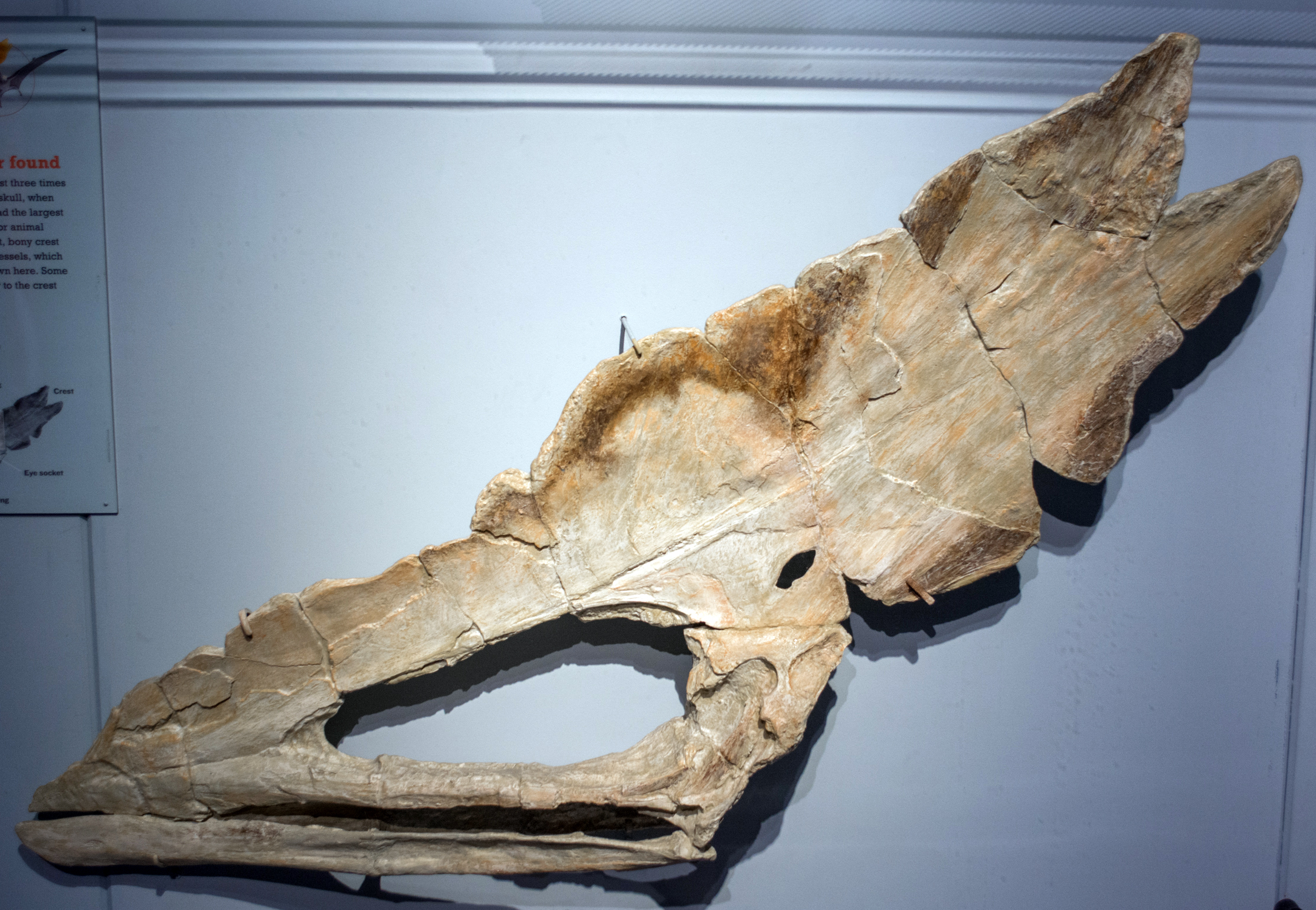
Cast of the T. sethi holotype skull at the Cleveland Museum of Natural History

Possible functions for Thalassodromeus's cranial crest were proposed by Kellner and Campos in 2002. They suggested that the network of blood vessels on its large surface was consistent with use for thermoregulation, which had also been suggested for the crests of some dinosaurs. Kellner and Campos thought that the crest was used for cooling (enabling the animal to dissipate excess metabolic heat through convection), while heat transfer was controlled by – and depended on – the network of blood vessels. The ability to control its body temperature would have aided Thalassodromeus during intense activity (such as hunting), and they suggested that, when in flight, heat would have been dispelled more effectively if the crest were aligned with the wind, while the head was intentionally moved to the sides. Kellner and Campos posited that the crest could have had additional functions, such as display; aided by colour, it could have been used in species recognition, and could also have been a sexually dimorphic feature (differing according to sex), as has been proposed for Pteranodon.

In 2006, Martill and Naish found that the crests of Tupuxuara and its relatives developed by the premaxillary portion of the crests growing backwards over the skull-roof (as indicated by the well-defined suture between the premaxilla and the underlying bones). The hind margin of the premaxillary part of this specimen's crest had only reached above the hind margin of the nasoantorbital fenestra, indicating that it was not an adult at the time of death. This suggests that the development of the crest happened late in the growth of an individual, was probably related to sexual display, and the sexual maturity of a given specimen could be assessed by the size and disposition of the crest. The T. sethi holotype, with its hypertrophied (enlarged) premaxillary crest, would thereby represent an old adult individual (and the mature stage of Tupuxuara, according to their interpretation). Kellner and Campos found Martill and Naish's discussion of cranial crest development interesting, although they found their proposed model speculative.

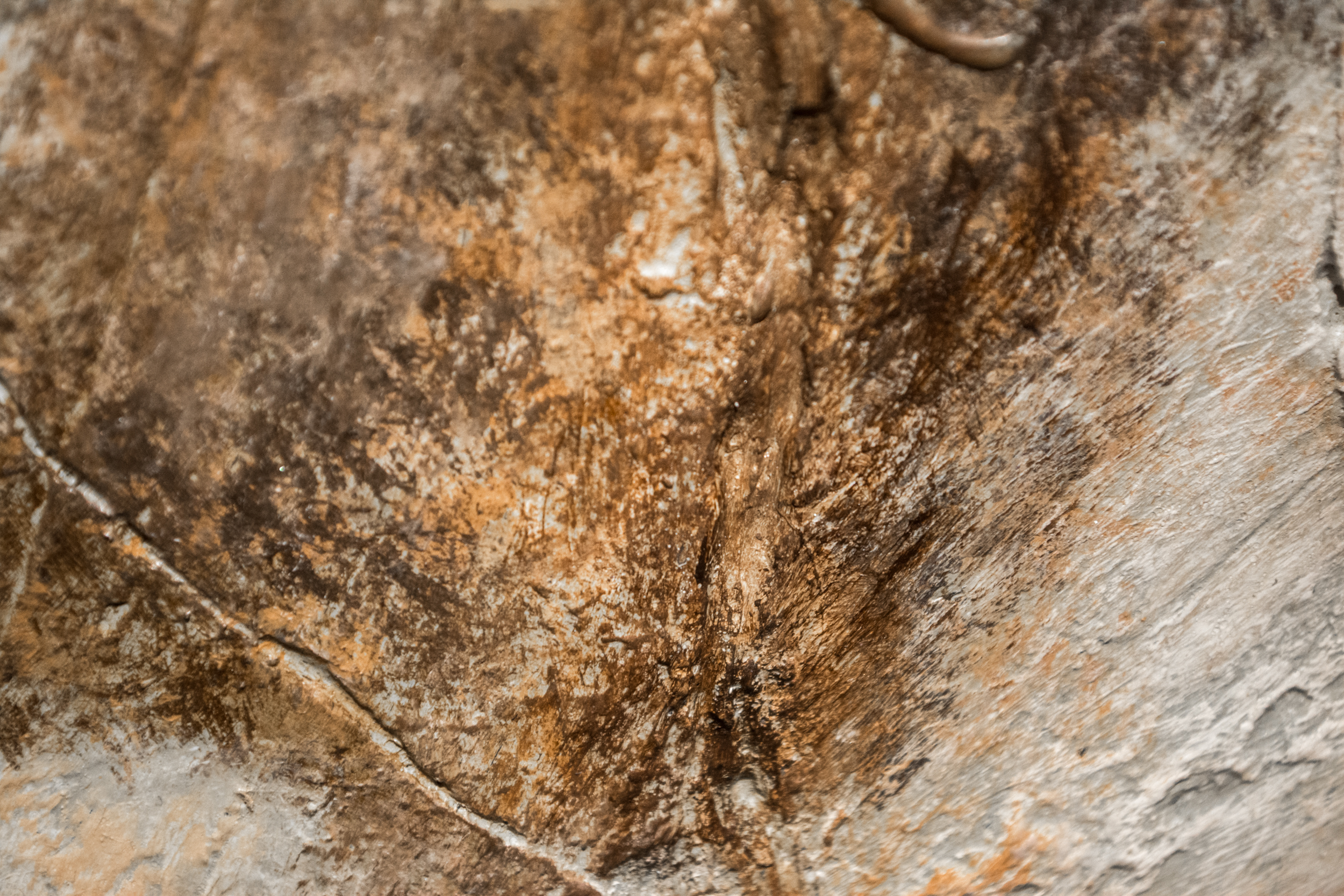
Blood vessels on the crest of the T. sethi holotype cast at the CMNH

Palaeontologists David W. E. Hone, Naish, and Innes C. Cuthill reiterated Martill and Naish's growth hypothesis in 2012; since pterosaurs were probably precocial and able to fly shortly after hatching, the role of the crest was relevant only after maturity (when the structure was fully grown). They deemed the thermoregulation hypothesis an unlikely explanation for the blood-vessel channels on the crest, which they found consistent with nourishment for growing tissue (such as the keratin in bird beaks). Hone, Naish, and Cuthill suggested that the wing membranes and air-sac system would have been more effective at controlling heat than a crest, and wind and water could also have helped cool pterosaurs in high-temperature maritime settings.

In 2013, Witton agreed that the substantially larger crests of adult thalassodromids indicated that they were more important for behavioural activities than for physiology. He found the idea that the crests were used for thermoregulation problematic, since they did not grow regularly with body size; they grew at a fast pace in near-adults, quicker than what would be predicted for the growth of a thermoregulatory structure. According to Witton, the large, highly vascular wing membranes of pterosaurs would provide the surface area needed for thermoregulation, meaning the crests were not needed for that function. He concluded that the crest's blood-vessel patterns did not differ much from those seen on bones under the beaks of birds, which are used for transporting nutrients to the bone and soft tissues rather than for thermoregulation. Witton noted that although bird beaks lose heat quickly, that is not what they were developed for; the crests of pterosaurs might also have had an effect on thermoregulation, without this being their primary function.

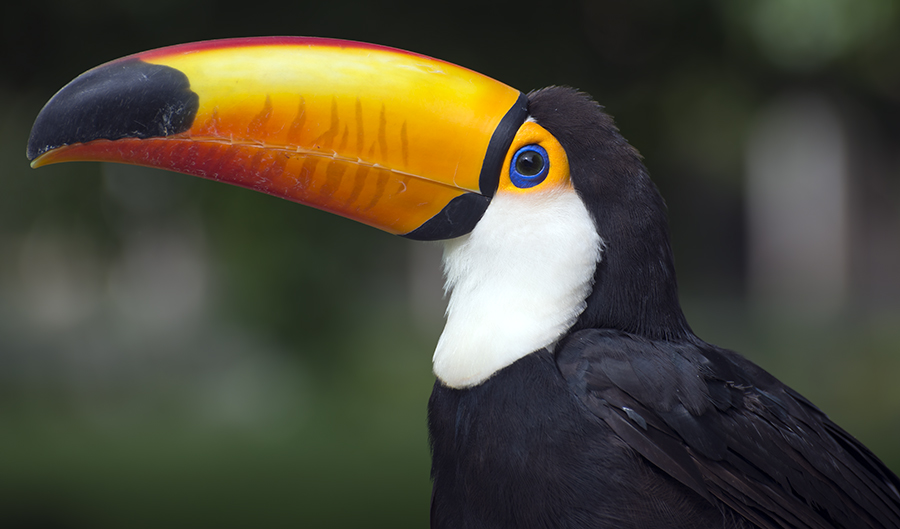
The crest of T. sethi has been compared to a toucan's bill.

Pêgas and colleagues noted that sexual dimorphism in crest size and shape has been proposed for some pterosaurs; the crest shape seen in the T. sethi holotype may correlate with one sex and may have been the result of sexual selection. They suggested that both sexes could have had similar crests due to mutual sexual selection, but interpretation of exaggerated features was challenging due to the small sample size; more T. sethi specimens would have to be found to evaluate these theories. They did not think that thermoregulation correlated with crest growth relative to body size, since the bills of toucans (the largest of any modern birds) grow drastically out of proportion to body size and function as thermoregulatory structures, as well as facilitating feeding and social behaviour. Pêgas and colleagues found the vascular structure of toucan bills comparable to that in the crest of T. sethi, concluding that the crest also had multiple functions.

=== Feeding and diet ===
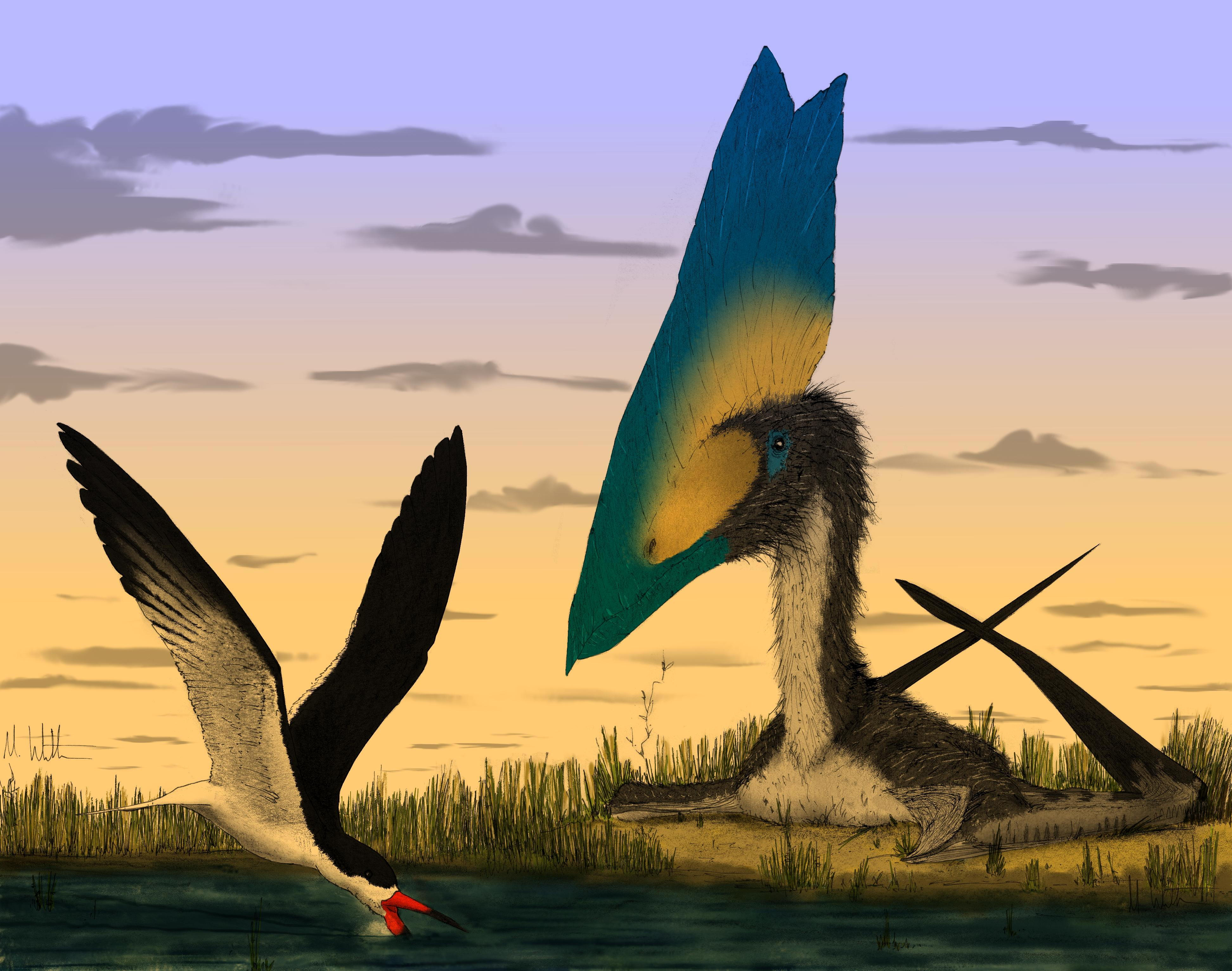
It was originally suggested that T. sethi (right) fed like an extant skimmer (left), but this theory has been criticised.

Kellner and Campos originally found the jaws of Thalassodromeus similar to those of modern skimmers – three bird species in the genus Rhynchops – with their sideways-compressed jaws, blade-like beak, and protruding lower jaw (resembling scissors in side view). They argued that Thalassodromeus would have fed in a similar way, as implied by the genus name; skimmers skim over the surface of water, dipping their lower jaw to catch fish and crustaceans. Kellner and Campos listed additional skull features of skimmers which are adaptations for skim feeding, including enlarged palatine bones, a feature also shared with Thalassodromeus. Unlike skimmers and other pterosaurs, the palatine bones of Thalassodromeus were concave, which the writers suggested could have helped it momentarily store food. Like skimmers, Thalassodromeus also appears to have had powerful neck muscles, large jaw muscles, and an upper jaw tip well-irrigated by blood (features which Kellner and Campos interpreted as adaptations for skimming). They concluded that the scissor-like bill and thin crest almost made other modes of capturing prey – such as swooping down toward water and plunging into it – impossible. Conceding the difficulty of reconstructing Thalassodromeus's fishing method, they envisioned it with a less-mobile neck than skimmers; with the crest impeding its head from submersion it would glide, flapping its wings only occasionally. They found that the pterosaur with jaws most similar to those of Thalassodromeus was the smaller Rhamphorhynchus, although they believed that it would have had limited skimming ability.

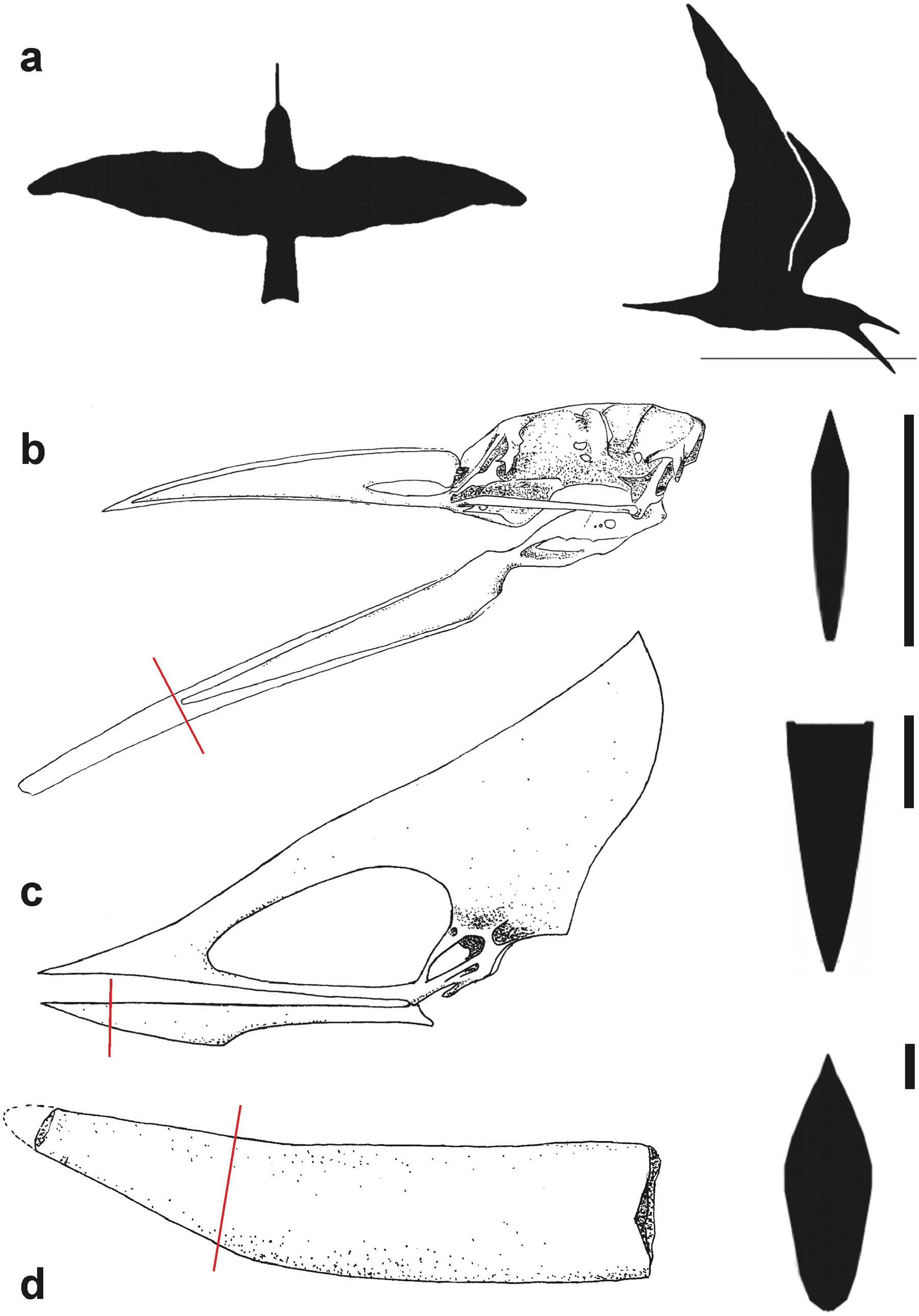
Comparison of the jaw of a skimmer (a–b), Tupuxuara (c), and the jaw tip of T. oberlii, d), with cross-sections at right

In 2004, palaeontologist Sankar Chatterjee and engineer R. Jack Templin said that smaller pterosaurs may have been able to skim-feed. They doubted that this was possible for larger ones, due to their lesser manoeuvrability and flying capability while resisting water. Chatterjee and Templin noted that skimmers have blunter beaks than pterosaurs like Thalassodromeus, to direct water from the jaw while skimming. In 2007, biophysicist Stuart Humphries and colleagues questioned whether any pterosaurs would have commonly fed by skimming and said that such conclusions had been based on anatomical comparisons rather than biomechanical data. The drag experienced by bird bills and pterosaur jaws was hydrodynamically and aerodynamically tested by creating model bills of the black skimmer, Thalassodromeus, and the (presumably) non-skimming Tupuxuara and towing them along a water-filled trough at varying speeds. The researchers found that skimming used more energy for skimmers than previously thought, and would have been impossible for a pterosaur weighing more than 1 kg (2.2 lb) due to the metabolic power required. They found that even smaller pterosaurs, like Rhamphorhynchus, were not adapted for skimming. The aluminium rigging of the Thalassodromeus model was destroyed during the experiment, due to the high and unstable forces exerted on it while skimming at high speed, casting further doubt on this feeding method. The authors used the jaw tip of T. oberlii to model the performance of Thalassodromeus, since it was assigned to T. sethi at the time.

Unwin and Martill suggested in 2007 that thalassodromids may have foraged similarly to storks, as had been suggested for azhdarchids. Witton said in 2013 that although skim-feeding had been suggested for many pterosaur groups, the idea was criticised in recent years; pterosaurs lacked virtually all adaptations for skim-feeding, making it unlikely that they fed this way. Thalassodromeus (unlike skimmers) did not have a particularly wide or robust skull or especially large jaw-muscle attachment sites, and its mandible was comparatively short and stubby. Witton agreed with Unwin and Martill that thalassodromids, with their equal limb proportions and elongated jaws, were suited to roaming terrestrially and feeding opportunistically; their shorter, more flexible necks indicated a different manner of feeding than azhdarchids, which had longer, stiffer necks. He suggested that thalassodromids may have had more generalised feeding habits, and azhdarchids may have been more restricted; Thalassodromeus may have been better at handling relatively large, struggling prey than its relative, Tupuxuara, which had a more lightly built skull. Witton stressed that more studies of functional morphology would have to be done to illuminate the subject and speculated that Thalassodromeus might have been a raptorial predator, using its jaws to subdue prey with strong bites; its concave palate could help it swallow large prey.

Pêgas and Kellner presented a reconstruction of the mandibular muscles of T. sethi at a conference in 2015. They found that its well-developed jaw muscles differed from those of the possible dip-feeder Anhanguera and the terrestrially stalking azhdarchids, indicating that T. sethi had a strong bite force. In 2018, Pêgas and colleagues agreed that Thalassodromeus' blade-like, robust jaws indicated that it could have used them to strike and kill prey, but they thought that biomechanical work was needed to substantiate the idea. They found (unlike Witton) that Thalassodromeus had a reinforced jaw joint and robust jaw muscles, but more work was needed to determine its dietary habits. According to Pêgas and colleagues, the articulation between T. sethi's articular and quadrate bones (where the lower jaw connected with the skull) indicates a maximum gape of 50 degrees – similar to the 52-degree gape inferred for Quetzalcoatlus.

=== Locomotion ===
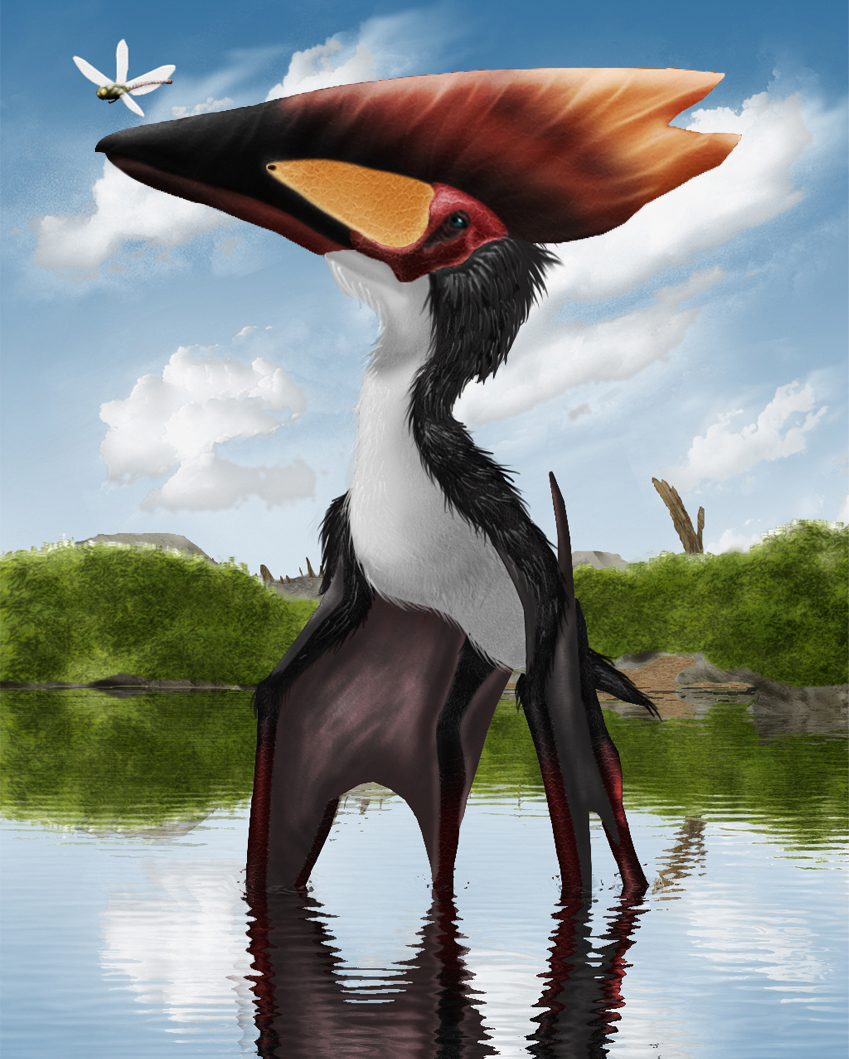
Restoration of T. sethi wading in a marsh

In a 2002 comment on the original description of T. sethi, engineer John Michael Williams noted that although Kellner and Campos had mentioned that the large crest might have interfered aerodynamically during flight, they had not elaborated on this point and had compared the pterosaur with a bird one-fifth its size. He suggested that Thalassodromeus used its crest to balance its jaws, with the head changing attitude depending on the mode of locomotion. Williams speculated that the crest would be inflatable with blood and presented varying air resistance, which he compared to a handheld fan; this would have helped the animal change the attitude of the head during flight (and during contact with water), keeping it from rotating without powerful neck muscles. The crest would have made long flights possible, rather than interfering; Williams compared it with the spermaceti in the head of the sperm whale, stating it is supposedly used to change buoyancy through temperature adjustment. Kellner and Campos rejected the idea of an inflatable crest, since its compressed bones would not allow this; they did not find the sperm-whale analogy convincing in relation to flying animals, noting that spermaceti is more likely to be used during aggression or for sonar. They agreed that the idea of the crest having an in-flight function was tempting and sideways movement of the head would have helped it change direction, but biomechanical and flight-mechanical studies of the crest would have to be conducted to determine the animal's aerodynamics.

Witton also expressed hope for further analysis of thalassodromid locomotion. He noted that since their limb proportions were similar to those of the better-studied azhdarchids, the shape of their wings and style of flight might have been similar. Thalassodromids might also have been adapted for inland flight; their wings were short and broad (unlike the long, narrow wings of marine soarers), and were more manoeuvrable and less likely to snag on obstacles. Their lower shoulder muscles appear to have been enlarged, which would have helped with powerful (or frequent) wing downstrokes and takeoff ability. Although it may have had to compensate for its large crest during flight, its development late in growth indicates that it did not develop primarily for aerodynamics. Witton suggested that the proportional similarity between the limbs of thalassodromids and azhdarchids also indicates that their terrestrial abilities would have been comparable. Their limbs would have been capable of long strides, and their short, compact feet would have made these mechanics efficient. The enlarged shoulder muscles may have allowed them to accelerate quickly when running, and they may have been as adapted for movement on the ground as has been suggested for azhdarchids; Witton cautioned that more analysis of thalassodromids was needed to determine this.

== Palaeoenvironment ==
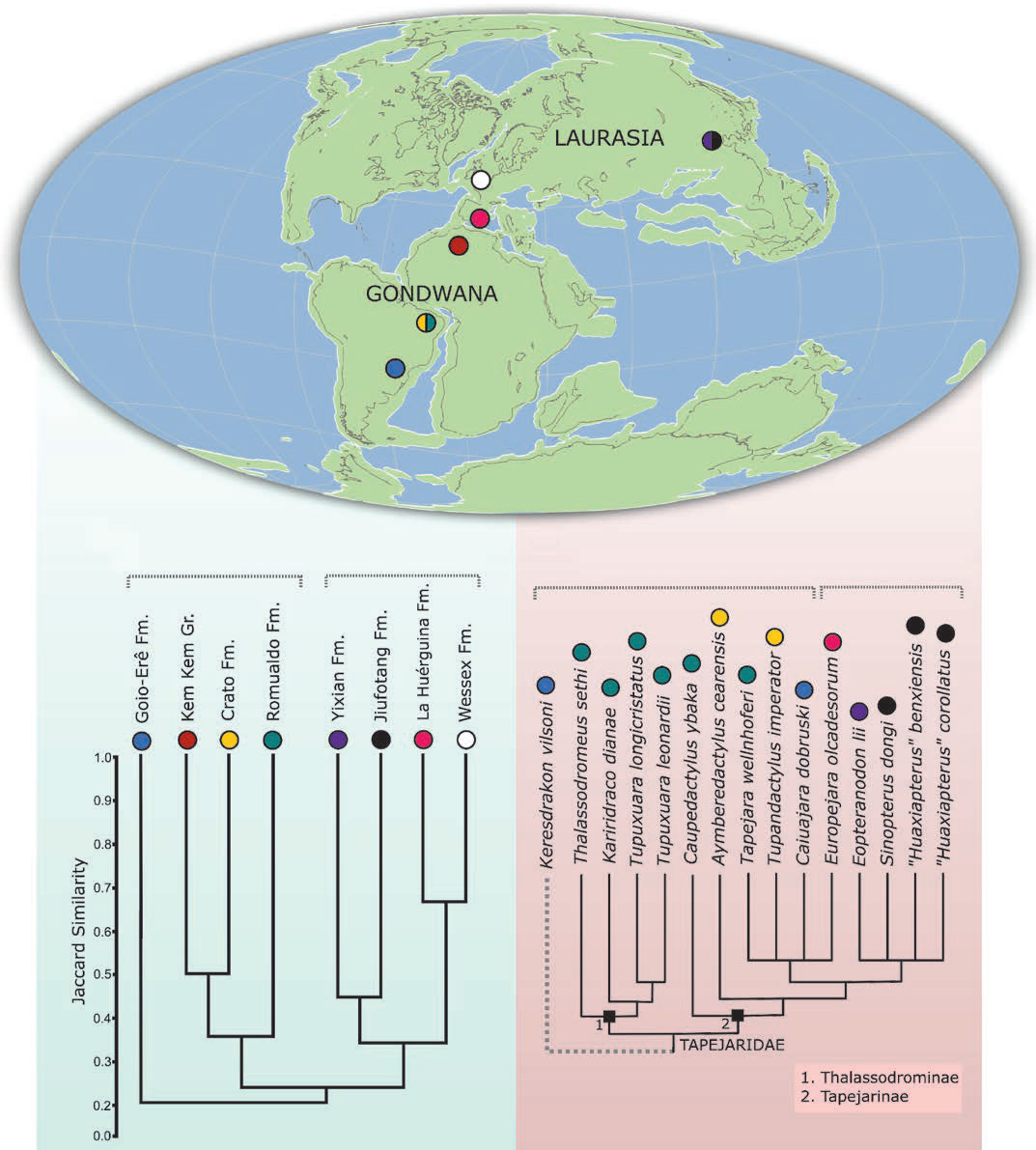
Cretaceous paleomap showing where Thalassodromeus (teal) and its relatives have been found

Thalassodromeus is known from the Romualdo Formation, which dates to the Albian stage of the Early Cretaceous period (about 110 million years ago). The formation is part of the Santana Group and, at the time Thalassodromeus was described, was thought to be a member of what was then considered the Santana Formation. The Romualdo Formation is a Lagerstätte (a sedimentary deposit that preserves fossils in excellent condition) consisting of lagoonal limestone concretions embedded in shales, and overlies the Crato Formation. It is well known for preserving fossils three-dimensionally in calcareous concretions, including many pterosaur fossils. As well as muscle fibres of pterosaurs and dinosaurs, fish preserving gills, digestive tracts, and hearts have been found there. The formation's tropical climate largely corresponded to today's Brazilian climate. Most of its flora were xerophytic (adapted to dry environments). The most widespread plants were Cycadales and the conifer Brachyphyllum.

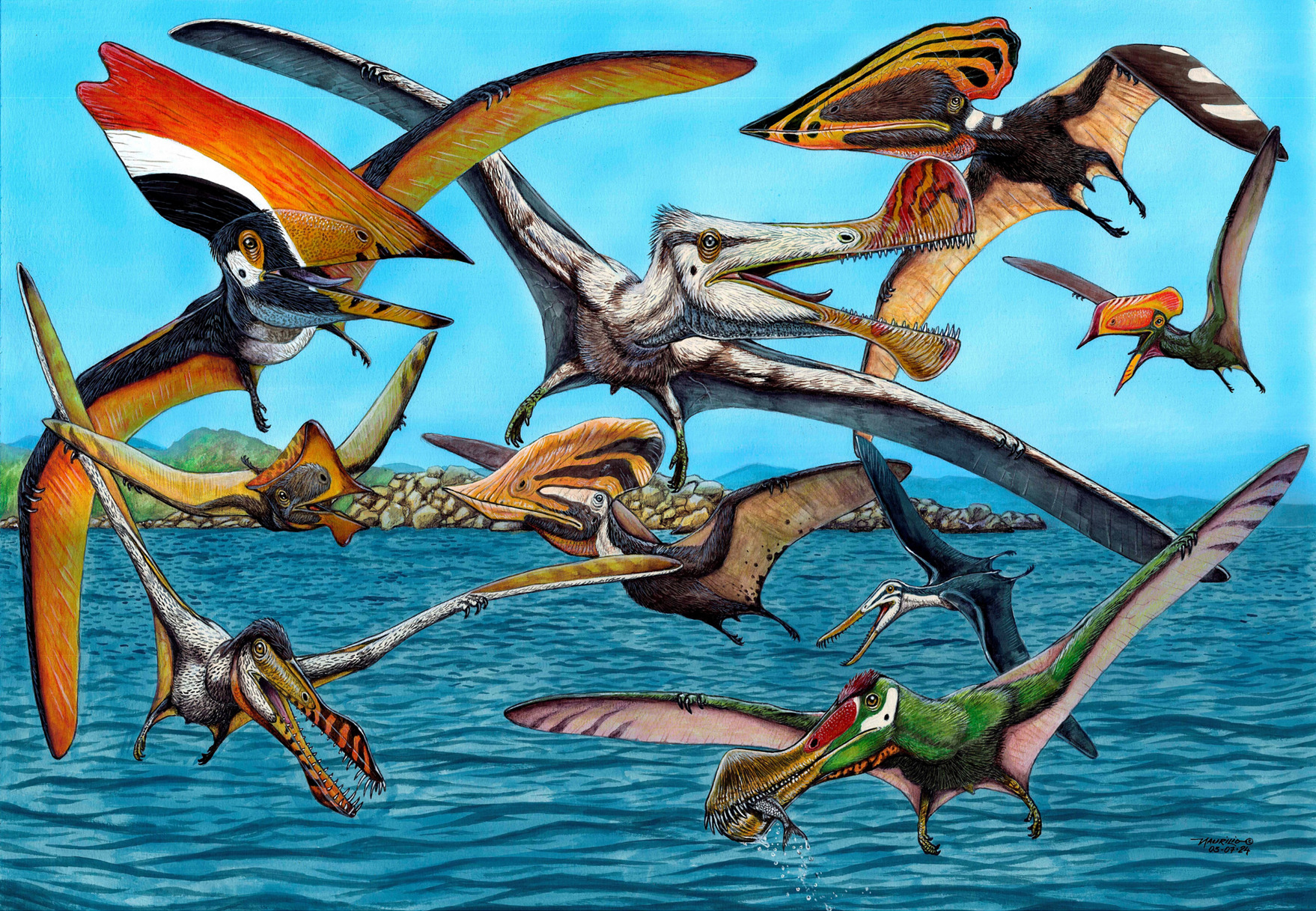
Life restorations of Thalassodromeus (upper left) and other pterosaurs known from the Romualdo Formation

Other pterosaurs from the Romualdo Formation include Anhanguera, Araripedactylus, Araripesaurus, Brasileodactylus, Cearadactylus, Coloborhynchus, Santanadactylus, Tapejara, Tupuxuara, Barbosania, Maaradactylus, Tropeognathus, and Unwindia. Thalassodromines are known only from this formation, and though well-preserved postcranial remains from there have been assigned to the group, they cannot be assigned to genus due to their lack of skulls. The dinosaur fauna includes theropods like Irritator, Santanaraptor, Mirischia, and an indeterminate unenlagiine dromaeosaur. The crocodyliforms Araripesuchus and Caririsuchus, as well as the turtles Brasilemys, Cearachelys, Araripemys, Euraxemys, and Santanachelys, are known from the deposits. There were also clam shrimps, sea urchins, ostracods, and molluscs. Well-preserved fish fossils record the presence of hybodont sharks, guitarfish, gars, amiids, ophiopsids, oshuniids, pycnodontids, aspidorhynchids, cladocyclids, bonefishes, chanids, mawsoniids and some uncertain forms. Pêgas and colleagues noted that pterosaur taxa from the Romualdo Formation had several species: two of Thalassodromeus, two of Tupuxuara, and up to six species of Anhanguera. It is possible that not all species in each taxon coexisted in time (as has been proposed for the pteranodontids of the Niobrara Formation), but there is not enough stratigraphic data for the Romualdo Formation to test this.

== See also ==
- List of pterosaur genera
- Timeline of pterosaur research
