= Rare bird =

Rare bird may refer to:

- A Rare Bird, a 1935 French comedy film
- "A Rare Bird", an episode of the 2019 Indian animated series Chacha Chaudhary
- Rare Bird, an English progressive rock band
- Rare Bird (album), by American singer-songwriter Whitton

== See also ==
- Rare Birds (disambiguation)
