= Whitley =

Whitley may refer to:

== Places ==
=== United Kingdom ===
- Whitley, Berkshire, a suburb of Reading
- Whitley, Cheshire, a village near Warrington
- Whitley, Coventry, a suburb of Coventry, West Midlands
- Whitley, Essex, near Birdbrook
- Whitley, Wigan, Greater Manchester, a location
- Whitley, North Yorkshire, a village in the Selby district
- Whitley, South Yorkshire, a location
- Whitley, Wiltshire, a village in the civil parish of Melksham Without
- Whitley Bay, a town in Tyne and Wear, known as Whitley until the 19th century
- Whitley Lower and Whitley Upper, West Yorkshire

=== United States ===
- Whitley City, Kentucky
- Whitley County, Indiana
- Whitley County, Kentucky
- Whitley Township, Moultrie County, Illinois

== In the military ==
- Armstrong Whitworth Whitley, a British bomber of the Second World War
- HMS Whitley (L23), a British destroyer in commission in the Royal Navy from 1918 to 1921 and from 1939 to 1940

== Schools ==
- Whitley Secondary School, Bishan, Singapore
- Whitley Abbey Community School, Coventry, England
- Whitley College, University of Melbourne, Australia

== People ==
- Whitley (surname)

=== Given name ===
- Whitley (singer), singer/songwriter from Melbourne, Australia
- Whitley Thomas Ewing, or W. T. Ewing, American politician, physician, postmaster
- Whitley Gilbert, fictional character from the 1980s sitcom A Different World
- Whitley Strieber, American science fiction and horror writer

== See also ==
- Witley, village in Surrey
- Whiteley, community in the county of Hampshire, England
- Wheatley (disambiguation)
