= Rare Birds =

Rare Birds may refer to:

- Rare Birds (novel), a novel by Edward Riche
- Rare Birds (film), a 2001 Canadian comedy-drama film, adapted from the novel
- Rare Birds (album), a 2018 album by Jonathan Wilson
- Rare Birds: Hour of Song (album), a 2023 album by The Bug Club

== See also ==
- Rare bird (disambiguation)
