= Wyton =

Wyton may refer to the following places in England:

- Wyton, Cambridgeshire
- Wyton, East Riding of Yorkshire

Wyton may also refer to:

- RAF Wyton, an RAF airbase near Wyton, Cambridgeshire

== See also ==
- Witton (disambiguation)
- Wytham, a village in Oxfordshire
