= Whitton (singer-songwriter) =

American singer-songwriter

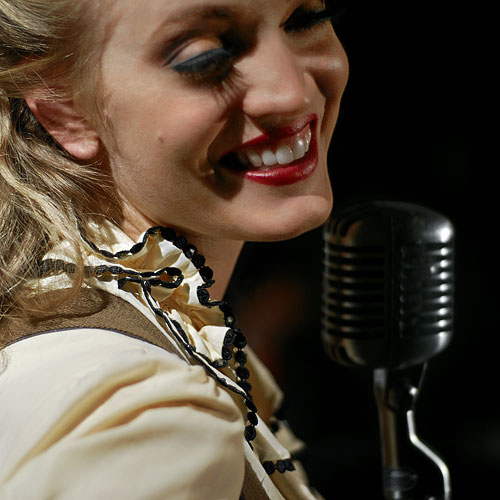

Background information
- Birth name: Jaime Whitton
- Origin: Los Angeles, CA, US
- Genres: Acoustic, Pop
- Occupation(s): Singer, songwriter
- Years active: 2009–present
- Labels: Independent
- Website: whittonmusic.com

Jaime Whitton is an independent American singer-songwriter who performs under her mononym Whitton. She started her career in 2009, releasing a self-titled EP in 2010, and in 2011 debut album Rare Bird, which was mixed by producer-engineer Michael James and nominated for Best Pop Album by the Independent Music Awards.

== Early life ==
Whitton, the youngest in a musical family of six children, was born and raised in Reno, Nevada, and began performing at age 6 with the international organization Sunshine Generation Children's Performing Group. She started her first band at age 17 called Jamie and the Blue Suits, and then moved to South Carolina to collaborate on two country folk albums with her sister. She later moved to Los Angeles and wrote the song "Apple Tree" which was prominently placed in the 2010 film The 5th Quarter starring Andie MacDowell and Aidan Quinn. The song was then released on her self-titled EP.

== Career ==
Since 2010, Whitton's music has been used in various feature films, television programs and commercials. In 2012, "I Fell in Love" (from Whitton EP) was used in a national Valentine's commercial as part of the Crazy, Cupid, Love promotional campaign for The CW's teen television series Gossip Girl. The same track is used by Swedish home shopping and e-commerce company Ellos, as well as by Delta Air Lines' in-flight entertainment, Munchkin Inc., a designer and manufacturer of infant and toddler products, and placement in MTV's reality-based, docudrama television series Catfish: The TV Show. The song "All I Want to Do" (from Rare Bird) was used in the comedy film She Wants Me with Hilary Duff and Charlie Sheen. "Monster" was used in the indie horror flick Among Friends. And a section of non-album track "Mercy" was featured in the independent romantic comedy film Exit Strategy with Big Boy and Kevin Hart. Additionally, Whitton was a guest vocalist on Showtime's drama series Dexter.

== Discography ==
=== Studio albums ===
- Rare Bird (2011)

=== EPs ===
- Whitton EP (2010)
