= Whitton (EP) =

Whitton EP

EP by Whitton
- Released: March 30, 2010
- Recorded: Los Angeles, CA
- Genre: Acoustic, Pop
- Length: 15 Minutes
- Label: Independent

Whitton chronology
Whitton EP (2010)	Rare Bird (2011)

Whitton EP is an EP which was released by independent American singer-songwriter Whitton in 2010 in the United States.

Tracks from this EP have been used in various feature films, television programs and commercials. The song "Apple Tree" was prominently placed in the 2010 film The 5th Quarter starring Andie MacDowell and Aidan Quinn. In 2012, "I Fell in Love" was used in a national Valentine's commercial as part of the Crazy, Cupid, Love promotional campaign for The CW's teen television series Gossip Girl. The same track is used by Swedish home shopping and e-commerce company Ellos, as well as by Delta Air Lines' in-flight entertainment, Munchkin Inc., a designer and manufacturer of infant and toddler products, and placement in MTV's reality-based, docudrama television series Catfish: The TV Show.

== Track listing ==
No.	Title	Length
1.	"I Fell in Love"	2:07
2.	"Shy"	3:45
3.	"'Til The End"	3:07
4.	"Apple Tree"	2:40
5.	"All I Want to Do"	3:31
