= Wittington =

Wittington may refer to:

- Wittington Investments, British holding company
- Françoise Wittington (born 1953), French rower

== See also ==
- Whittington (disambiguation)
