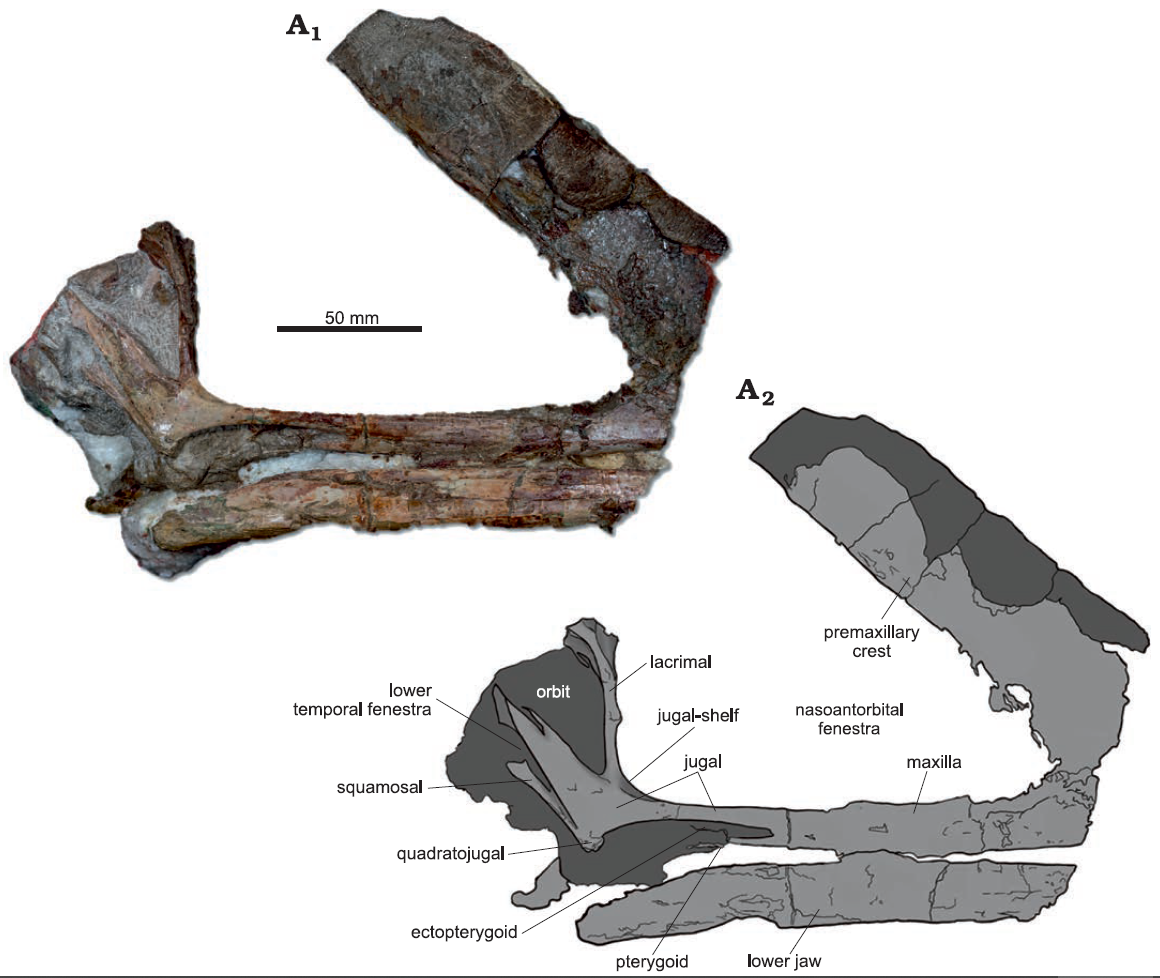
- Holotype specimen of Kariridraco

Scientific classification
- Kingdom: Animalia
- Phylum: Chordata
- Class: Reptilia
- Order: †Pterosauria
- Suborder: †Pterodactyloidea
- Clade: †Azhdarchoidea
- Family: †Thalassodromidae
- Genus: †Kariridraco; Cerqueira et al., 2021

Type species
- †Kariridraco dianae Cerqueira et al., 2021

= Kariridraco =

Kariridraco Temporal range: Albian

Genus of thalassodromine pterosaur from the Early Cretaceous

Kariridraco is a genus of thalassodromid pterosaur from the Early Cretaceous-aged Romualdo Formation, Brazil. The genus contains a single species, Kariridraco dianae.

== Discovery and naming ==
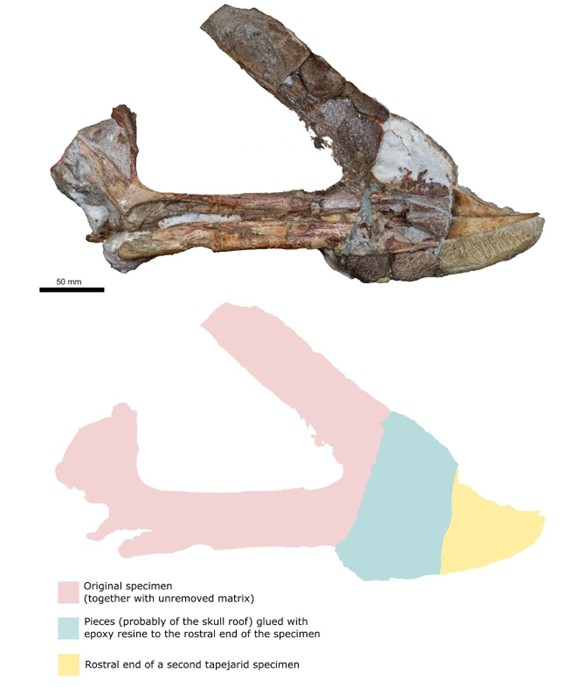
Holotype specimen as originally glued to another specimen

Local workers in Ceará at some unknown location collected a concretion containing the back of the skull of a pterosaur. To enhance its value, they glued the snout of another specimen to the front of the skull. Ultimately, they donated the find to the Museu de Paleontologia Plácido Cidade Nuvens. Before his death in 2016, Nuvens let other experts study the concretion. The falsification was then discovered. They concluded that the fossil represented a species new to science. There were no indications that the snout belonged to the same species.

The new genus and species Kariridraco dianae was named and described in 2021, by Gabriela M. Cerqueira, Mateus A.C. Santos, Maikon F. Marks, Juliana Manso Sayão and Felipe Lima Pinheiro, based on the holotype MPSC R 1056, a fairly complete skull, including the lower jaws, and the first four neck vertebrae. The generic name refers to the Kariri people of the Araripe Plateau, while the specific name refers to Diana Prince, alter ego of the DC Comics superheroine Wonder Woman.

== Description ==
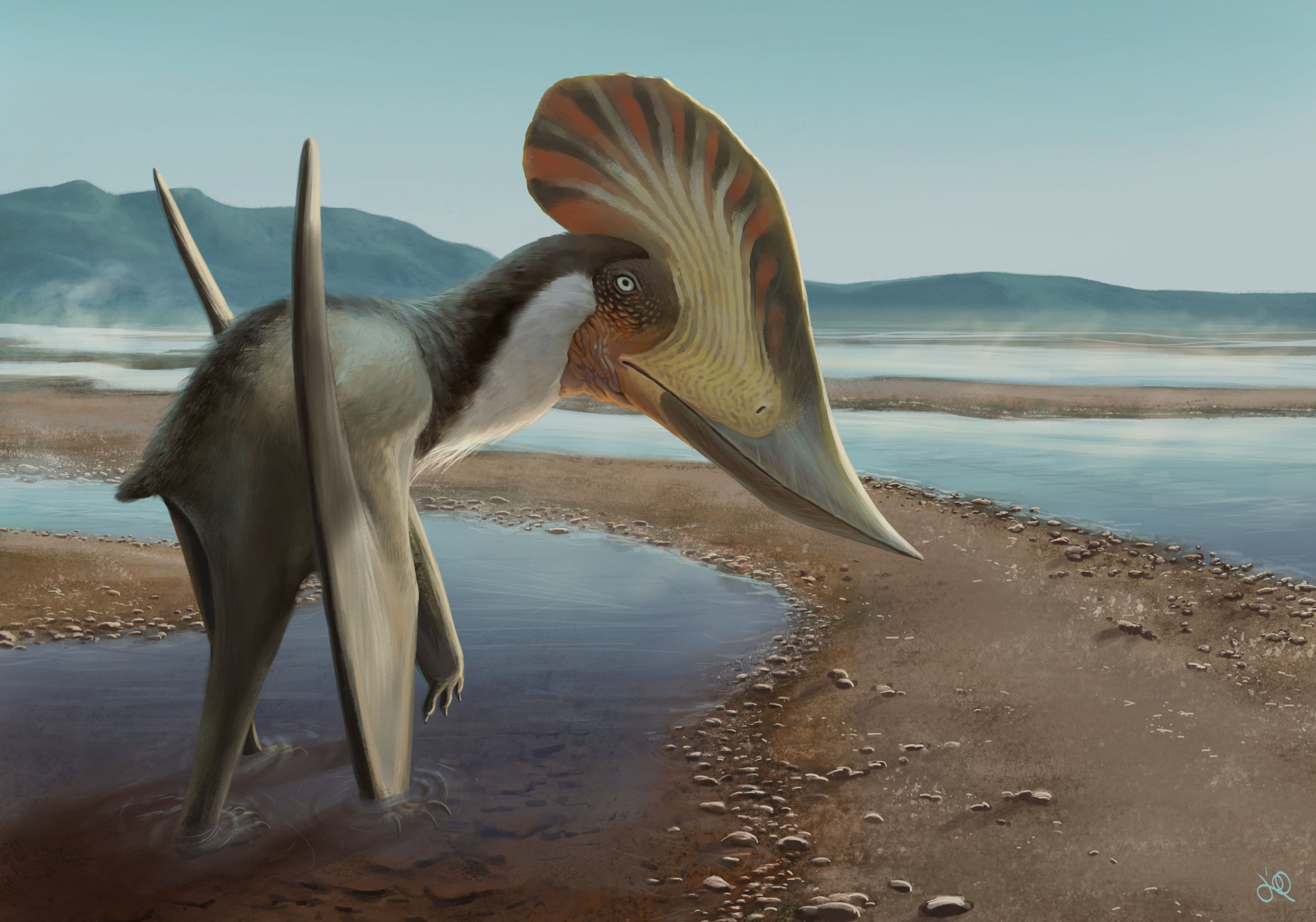
Life reconstruction by Júlia d’Oliveira

The lower jaws have a preserved length of 205 millimetres.

Two distinguishing traits were established. They are autapomorphies, unique derived characters. The premaxillary snout crest makes an angle of about 45° with the maxilla. The lacrimal bone has a deep excavation pointing to the front.

== Phylogeny ==
Cerqueira et al. performed a phylogenetic analysis and placed Kariridraco in the Thalassodromidae. Their cladogram is shown below:

- Azhdarchoidea
  - Dsungaripteridae
  - - - Azhdarchidae
      - Chaoyangopteridae
    - Tapejaridae
      - Tapejarinae
      - Thalassodrominae
        - Thalassodromeus
        - - Kariridraco
          - - Tupuxuara leonardii
            - Tupuxuara longicristatus
