= Nicola Whitton =

British academic and author

Professor Nicola Whitton
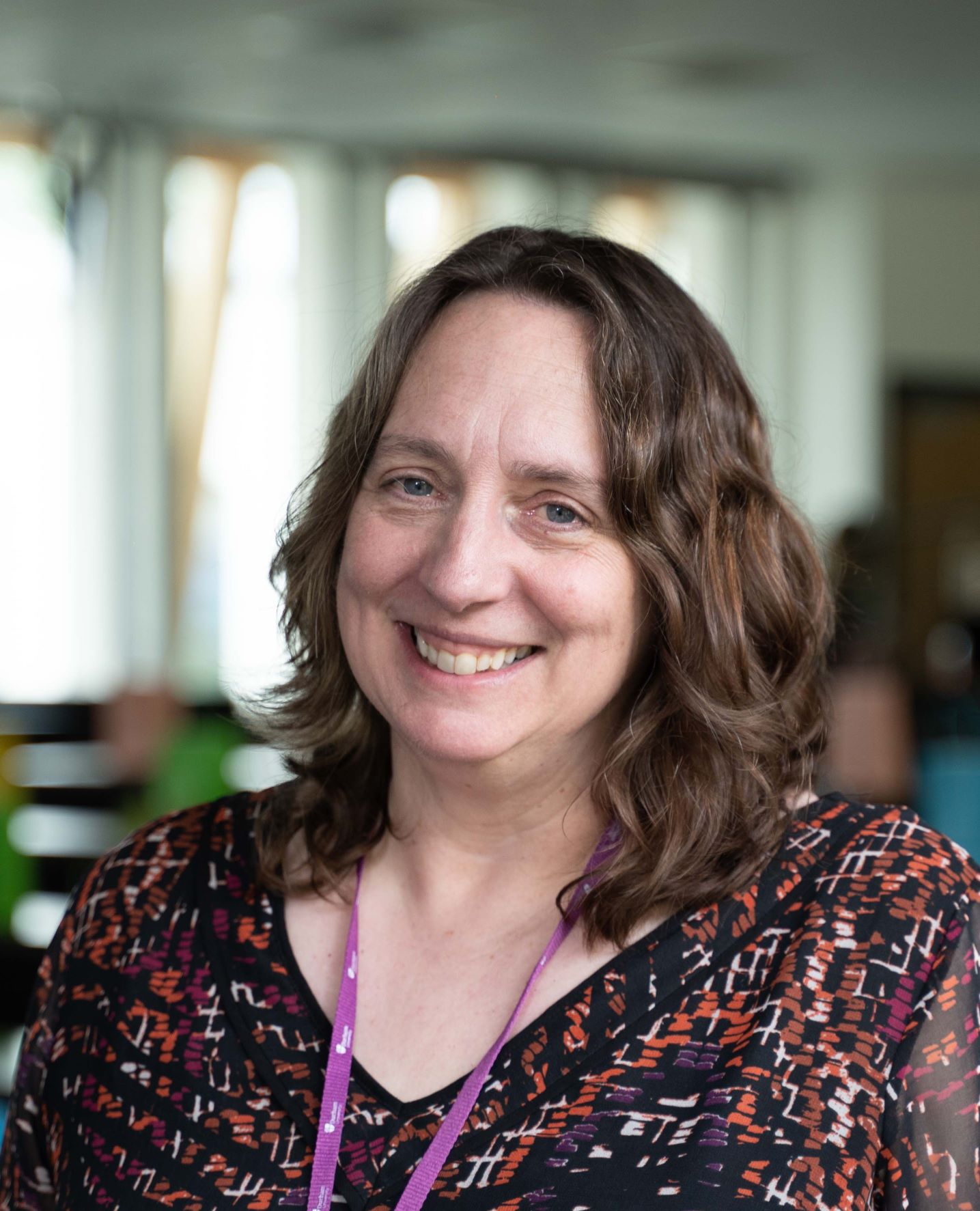
- 2023
- Born: 1972 (age 52–53)
- Known for: Education research, playful learning

Nicola Whitton is an academic, author, and speaker.

== Academic career ==
Nicola Whitton is Professor of Digital Learning and Play in the Department of Computer and Information Science at Northumbria University Newcastle. Prior to this role Nicola was the Director of Durham Centre for Academic Development and a Professor of Education at Durham University. Prior to joining the University Whitton worked as a Professor of Professional Learning at Manchester Metropolitan University.

Whitton holds a doctorate in the use of educational games for learning and her research focuses on the play in adulthood, in particular games and learning in the context of Higher Education, and the potential of play in teaching, research, and academic practice.

Whitton's most recent projects have focused on the potential of escape room design for learning. Whitton has also published many books and articles in the field of playfulness, games and learning. Whitton was the founder of the Playful Learning Network and former co-chair. Whitton also co-created the Playful Learning Conference which she co-chaired for the first 5 years (2016-2022).

Whitton's most recent publication (2022) Play and Learning in Adulthood: Reimagining Pedagogy and the Politics of Education available at Amazon. This book has been described as "the perfect gift for someone you don't like terribly much but want to spend a silly amount on".

== Bibliography ==
- Whitton, N. (2022). Play and Learning in Adulthood: Reimagining Pedagogy and the Politics of Education. London: Palgrave.
- Whitton, N. (2014). Digital games and learning: research and theory. New York: Routledge.
- Whitton, N. (2012). The place of game-based learning in an age of austerity. European Journal of E-Learning. 10/2, 249–256.
- Whitton, N. & Moseley, A. (2012). Using games to enhance learning and teaching. Education. New York: Routledge.
- Whitton, N. (2011). Game engagement theory and adult learning. Simulation & Gaming, 42/5, 597–610.
- Whitton, N. (2010). Learning with Digital Games: A Practical Guide to Engaging Students in Higher Education. New York: Routledge.
