= Rare Bird (album) =

Studio album by Whitton
- Released: September 24, 2011
- Recorded: Los Angeles, CA
- Genre: Acoustic, Pop
- Length: 34 Minutes
- Label: Independent

Whitton chronology
Whitton EP (2010)	Rare Bird (2011)

Rare Bird is the debut album by independent American singer-songwriter Whitton. It was released in 2011 in the United States and nominated for Best Pop Album by the Independent Music Awards. The 10-track album was mixed by producer-engineer Michael James.

In 2012, the song "All I Want to Do" was used in the comedy film She Wants Me with Hilary Duff and Charlie Sheen. "Monster" was used in the indie horror flick Among Friends.

== Track listing ==
No.	Title	Length
1.	"Turn Off The Light"	4:02
2.	"Rare Bird"	3:48
3.	"'Til The End"	3:09
4.	"Monster"	3:42
5.	"Nothin' At All"	2:53
6.	"All I Want to Do"	3:31
7.	"Pity Party"	2:43
8.	"B Sting"	3:17
9.	"New York"	2:51
10.	"Better Days"	4:44
