= Ellos =

Swedish retail company

Ellos Group is a Swedish home shopping and e-commerce company headquartered in Borås, Sweden. Ellos Group has operations mainly in the Nordic countries, as well as elsewhere in Europe.

== History ==
Ellos was founded in 1947 by Olle Blomqvist and Lars Gustafsson. They wanted their company to be named "LO:s" after their names, but were not allowed to register the name, as LO already used it. It has been suggested that the name "Ellos" originates from Olle's name backwards with a genitive "s" at the end, as first popularised on the Swedish talk show Hylands hörna.

In 1978, the company moved to its current location in Viared, 10 km west of Borås; the new premises were inaugurated by Carl XVI Gustaf, the king of Sweden.

In 1988, the ICA concern acquired the company, which then had 1,500 employees.

IK Partners (Formerly Industri Kapital) acquired Ellos from ICA in November 1995, with stake later sold to La Redoute (Redcats) in July 1997. During IK’s ownership, Ellos was a mail-order company in the Nordic countries. Between 1997 and 2013, Ellos was a part of Redcats, which is owned by the holding company PPR.

From 2013 until 2019, Ellos Group has been owned by the Sweden-based venture capital company Nordic Capital. Ellos is one of Scandinavia’s leading home shopping companies with an annual turnover of more than €200 million and 620 employees. In 2019, the company was sold to FNG N.V. However, FNG N.V. filed for bankruptcy on 30 July 2020. After a failed attempt at relaunching its brands, including Ellos, FNG N.V. filed for bankruptcy for a second time in February 2022 and subsequently liquidated its assets. In June 2022, Ellos Group was once again sold to Nordic Capital.

Ellos Group offers several of its own brands: Ellos within apparel and home products, and Jotex within home textile and decoration. Sub-brands within Ellos include Áhkká, Staycation, Ellos On Our Terms and Ellos Home among others.

Ellos is one of the main sponsors of the football club Elfsborg.
