= List of United Kingdom locations: Whitf-Why =

The United Kingdom

This is part of the list of United Kingdom locations: a gazetteer of place names in the United Kingdom showing each place's locality and geographical coordinates.

== Whitf-Whity ==
Location	Locality	Coordinates (links to map & photo sources)	OS grid reference
Whitfield	Kent	51.14°N 01.28°E	TR3044
Whitfield	Northamptonshire	52.04°N 01.12°W	SP6039
Whitfield	Northumberland	54.91°N 02.36°W	NY7758
Whitfield	South Gloucestershire	51.61°N 02.47°W	ST6791
Whitfield Court	Surrey	51.32°N 00.62°W	SU9659
Whitfield Hall	Northumberland	54.89°N 02.36°W	NY7756
Whitford	Devon	50.74°N 03.06°W	SY2595
Whitford	Flintshire	53.29°N 03.29°W	SJ1478
Whitgift	East Riding of Yorkshire	53.68°N 00.77°W	SE8122
Whitgreave	Staffordshire	52.84°N 02.16°W	SJ8928
Whithaugh	Scottish Borders	55.18°N 02.80°W	NY4988
Whithebeir	Orkney Islands	59.19°N 02.77°W	HY5634
Whithorn	Dumfries and Galloway	54.73°N 04.42°W	NX4440
Whiting Bay	North Ayrshire	55.47°N 05.10°W	NS0425
Whitkirk	Leeds	53.79°N 01.45°W	SE3633
Whitland	Carmarthenshire	51.81°N 04.61°W	SN2016
Whitlaw	Scottish Borders	55.71°N 02.81°W	NT4947
Whitleigh	Devon	50.41°N 04.15°W	SX4760
Whitletts	South Ayrshire	55.47°N 04.61°W	NS3523
Whitley	Berkshire	51.42°N 00.98°W	SU7170
Whitley	Coventry	52.39°N 01.48°W	SP3577
Whitley	North Yorkshire	53.68°N 01.15°W	SE5621
Whitley	Sheffield	53.44°N 01.48°W	SK3494
Whitley	Wigan	53.55°N 02.63°W	SD5807
Whitley	Wiltshire	51.39°N 02.17°W	ST8866
Whitley Bay	North Tyneside	55.04°N 01.45°W	NZ3572
Whitley Bridge	North Yorkshire	53.69°N 01.16°W	SE5522
Whitley Chapel	Northumberland	54.90°N 02.12°W	NY9257
Whitley Head	Bradford	53.88°N 01.95°W	SE0343
Whitley Heath	Staffordshire	52.83°N 02.28°W	SJ8126
Whitley Lower	Kirklees	53.64°N 01.66°W	SE2217
Whitley Reed	Cheshire	53.32°N 02.54°W	SJ6481
Whitley Row	Kent	51.24°N 00.13°E	TQ4952
Whitley Sands	North Tyneside	55.05°N 01.45°W	NZ3573
Whitley Thorpe	North Yorkshire	53.67°N 01.16°W	SE5520
Whitley Wood	Berkshire	51.41°N 00.96°W	SU7269
Whitlock's End	Solihull	52.38°N 01.85°W	SP1076
Whitminster	Gloucestershire	51.77°N 02.33°W	SO7708
Whitmoor	Devon	50.88°N 03.32°W	ST0710
Whitmore	Dorset	50.88°N 01.93°W	SU0509
Whitmore	Staffordshire	52.95°N 02.28°W	SJ8140
Whitmore Park	Coventry	52.43°N 01.51°W	SP3382
Whitnage	Devon	50.92°N 03.39°W	ST0215
Whitnash	Warwickshire	52.26°N 01.53°W	SP3263
Whitnell	Somerset	51.14°N 03.13°W	ST2139
Whitney Bottom	Somerset	50.91°N 02.96°W	ST3213
Whitney-on-Wye	Herefordshire	52.11°N 03.08°W	SO2647
Whitrigg (Bowness)	Cumbria	54.90°N 03.21°W	NY2257
Whitrigg (Torpenhow)	Cumbria	54.73°N 03.24°W	NY2038
Whitriggs	Scottish Borders	55.42°N 02.69°W	NT5615
Whitsbury	Hampshire	50.97°N 01.83°W	SU1219
Whitslaid	Scottish Borders	55.68°N 02.70°W	NT5644
Whitsome	Scottish Borders	55.74°N 02.22°W	NT8650
Whitsomehill	Scottish Borders	55.73°N 02.22°W	NT8649
Whitson	City of Newport	51.54°N 02.90°W	ST3783
Whitstable	Kent	51.35°N 01.02°E	TR1166
Whitstone	Cornwall	50.75°N 04.46°W	SX2698
Whittingham	Northumberland	55.39°N 01.90°W	NU0611
Whittingslow	Shropshire	52.48°N 02.84°W	SO4388
Whittington	Gloucestershire	51.88°N 01.98°W	SP0121
Whittington	Norfolk	52.56°N 00.52°E	TL7199
Whittington	Lancashire	54.17°N 02.61°W	SD6076
Whittington	Shropshire	52.87°N 03.01°W	SJ3231
Whittington (Kinver)	Staffordshire	52.43°N 02.22°W	SO8582
Whittington (Eccleshall)	Staffordshire	52.89°N 02.31°W	SJ7933
Whittington (near Lichfield)	Staffordshire	52.66°N 01.76°W	SK1608
Whittington	Warwickshire	52.58°N 01.57°W	SP2999
Whittington	Worcestershire	52.16°N 02.19°W	SO8752
Whittington Moor	Derbyshire	53.25°N 01.43°W	SK3873
Whittlebury	Northamptonshire	52.08°N 00.99°W	SP6943
Whittle-le-Woods	Lancashire	53.68°N 02.63°W	SD5821
Whittlesey	Cambridgeshire	52.55°N 00.12°W	TL2797
Whittlesford	Cambridgeshire	52.11°N 00.14°E	TL4748
Whittlestone Head	Lancashire	53.66°N 02.42°W	SD7219
Whitton	Powys	52.29°N 03.07°W	SO2767
Whitton	Shropshire	52.34°N 02.63°W	SO5772
Whitton	Herefordshire	52.36°N 02.86°W	SO4174
Whitton	Suffolk	52.08°N 01.12°E	TM1447
Whitton	Richmond upon Thames, London	51.44°N 00.36°W	TQ1473
Whitton	Darlington	54.59°N 01.41°W	NZ3822
Whitton	Scottish Borders	55.49°N 02.38°W	NT7622
Whitton	Northumberland	55.30°N 01.92°W	NU0501
Whitton	North Lincolnshire	53.70°N 00.63°W	SE9024
Whittonditch	Wiltshire	51.44°N 01.59°W	SU2872
Whittonstall	Northumberland	54.90°N 01.89°W	NZ0757
Whittytree	Shropshire	52.39°N 02.82°W	SO4478
Whitway	Hampshire	51.32°N 01.35°W	SU4559
Whitwell	Derbyshire	53.27°N 01.22°W	SK5276
Whitwell	Hertfordshire	51.87°N 00.28°W	TL1821
Whitwell	Isle of Wight	50.59°N 01.26°W	SZ5277
Whitwell	North Yorkshire	54.38°N 01.57°W	SE2899
Whitwell	Rutland	52.66°N 00.64°W	SK9208
Whitwell-on-the-Hill	North Yorkshire	54.07°N 00.90°W	SE7265
Whitwell Street	Norfolk	52.75°N 01.11°E	TG1022
Whitwick	Leicestershire	52.74°N 01.36°W	SK4316
Whitwood	Wakefield	53.71°N 01.39°W	SE4024
Whitworth	Lancashire	53.65°N 02.18°W	SD8818

== Whix-Why ==
Location	Locality	Coordinates (links to map & photo sources)	OS grid reference
Whixall	Shropshire	52.90°N 02.72°W	SJ5134
Whixley	North Yorkshire	54.01°N 01.32°W	SE4458
Whoberley	Coventry	52.39°N 01.56°W	SP3078
Wholeflats	Falkirk	56.00°N 03.71°W	NS9380
Whorlton	Durham	54.52°N 01.84°W	NZ1014
Whorlton	North Yorkshire	54.41°N 01.26°W	NZ4802
Whydown	East Sussex	50.85°N 00.41°E	TQ7009
Whygate	Northumberland	55.07°N 02.36°W	NY7776
Whyke	West Sussex	50.82°N 00.78°W	SU8604
Whyle	Herefordshire	52.23°N 02.66°W	SO5560
Whyteleafe	Croydon	51.30°N 00.09°W	TQ3358
