= Mark P. Witton =

British palaeontologist, author and palaeoartist

- Education: University of Portsmouth
- Known for: Palaeontology, pterosaur research, palaeoart
- Website: https://www.markwitton.co.uk/

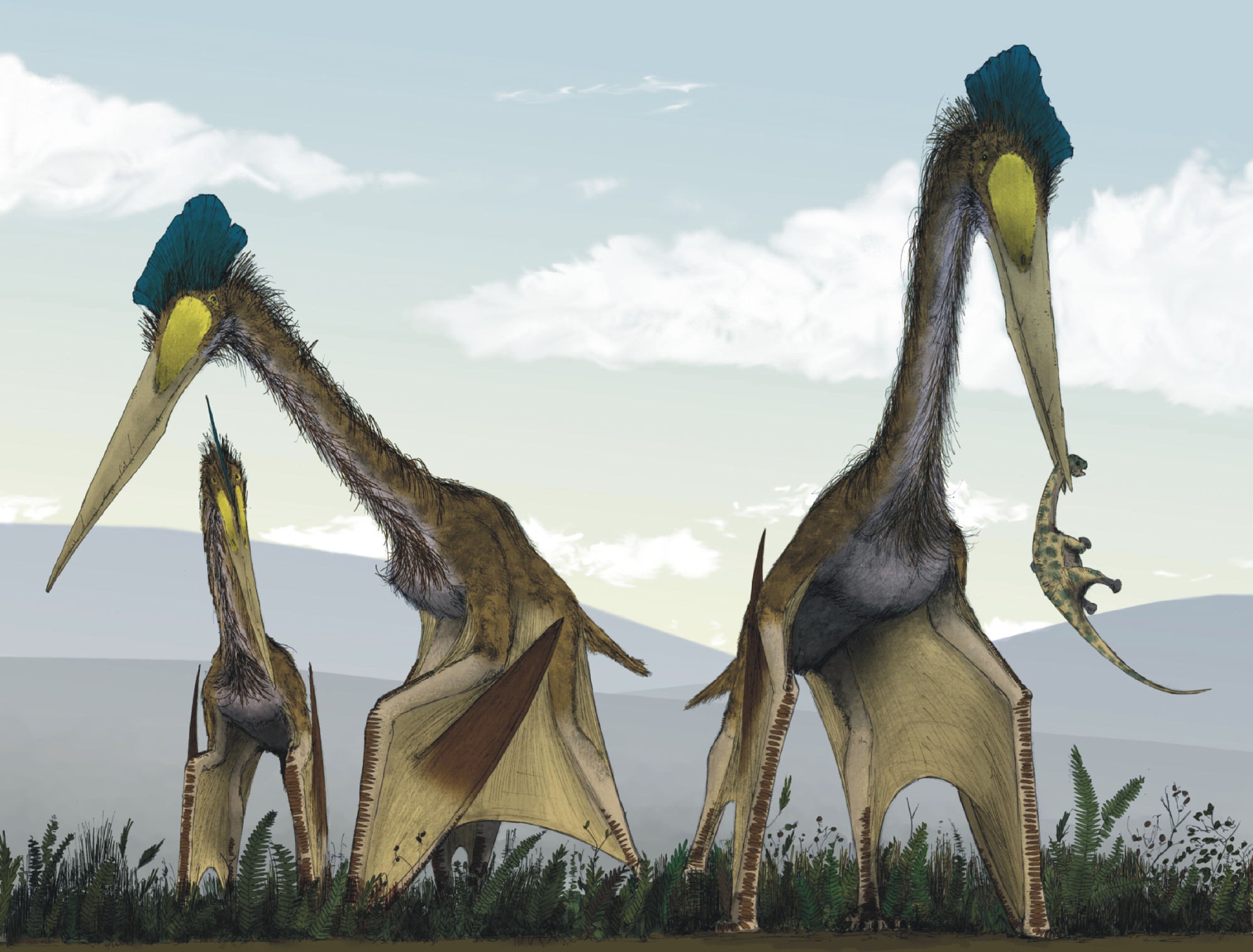
Life restoration of Quetzalcoatlus by Mark Witton

Mark Paul Witton is a British vertebrate, palaeontologist, author, and palaeoartist best known for his research and illustrations concerning pterosaurs, the extinct flying reptiles that lived alongside dinosaurs. He has worked with museums and universities around the world to reconstruct extinct animals, including as consultant to the BBC's Walking with Dinosaurs franchise, Planet Dinosaur, and Prehistoric Planet, and has published several critically acclaimed books on palaeontology and palaeoart.

Witton obtained a Bachelor's degree in Palaeobiology & Evolution and his PhD from the University of Portsmouth. Witton's scientific research has revolved largely around the habits, behaviours, systematics, and nomenclature of pterosaurs. His 2013 book Pterosaurs: Natural History, Evolution, Anatomy explores the anatomy, ecology and extinction of pterosaurs, in addition to being fully illustrated.

Witton's palaeoart is regarded as part of the modern, '"anatomically-rigorous" movement. He has published a book detailing his experience of reconstructing extinct animals in art, and he also published a "handbook" on the interaction of science and art to produce palaeoart, which was released in August 2018.
