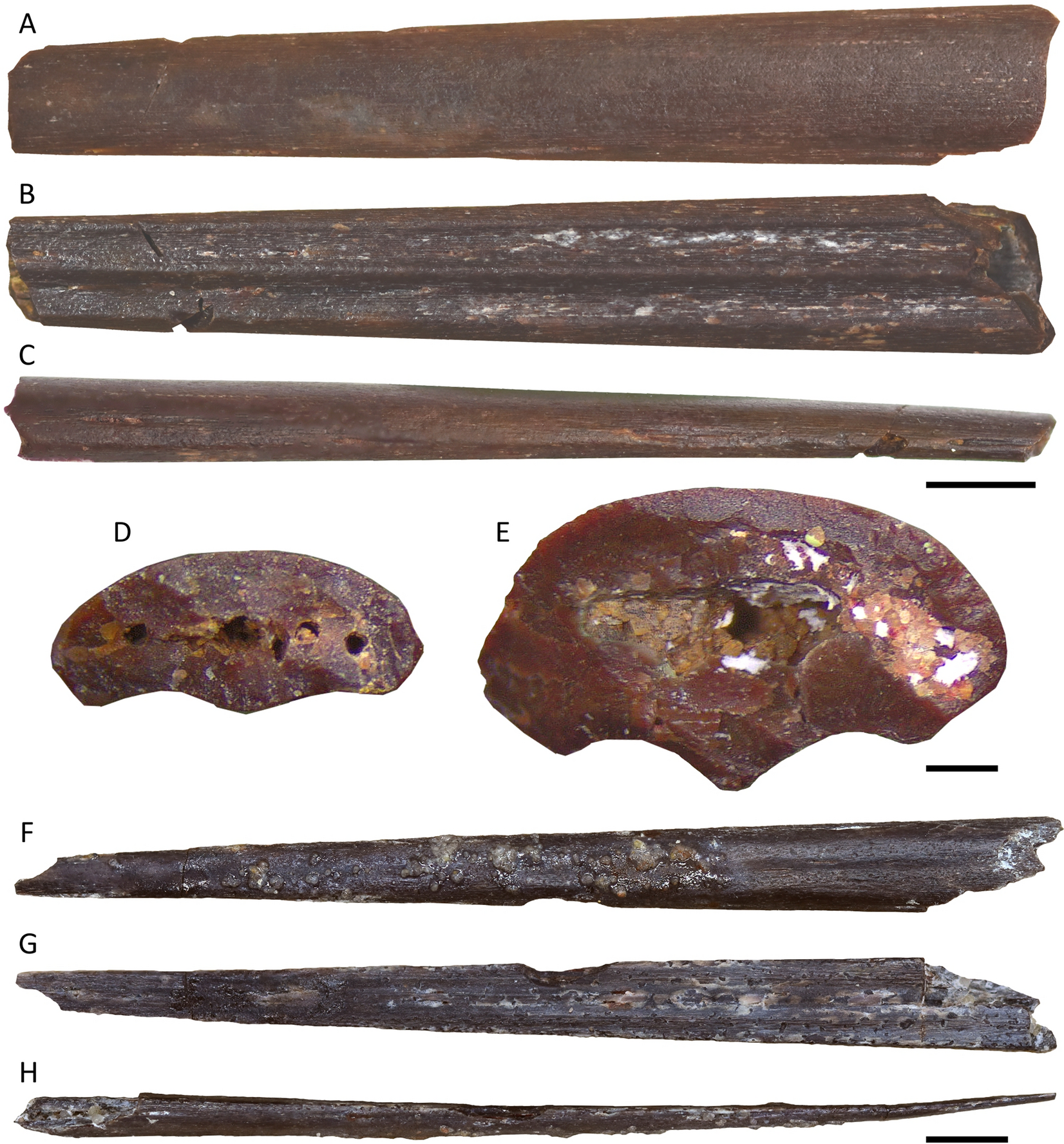
- Beak bones of Leptostomia; holotype rostrum (top jaw) (A–E) and paratype mandible (lower jaw) (F–H)

Scientific classification
- Kingdom: Animalia
- Phylum: Chordata
- Class: Reptilia
- Order: †Pterosauria
- Suborder: †Pterodactyloidea
- Clade: †Azhdarchoidea
- Clade: †Azhdarchiformes
- Family: †Alanqidae
- Genus: †Leptostomia; Smith et al., 2021

Type species
- †Leptostomia begaaensis Smith et al., 2021

= Leptostomia =

Leptostomia Temporal range: mid-Cretaceous, ?Albian–Cenomanian

Genus of azhdarchoid pterosaur

Leptostomia (lit. 'slim mouth') is an extinct genus of pterosaur that lived during the Cenomanian and possibly Albian stages of the ?Early-Late Cretaceous period in what is now Morocco, North Africa. Leptostomia is known from only two isolated rostrum (beak) fragments. In 2021, paleontologist Roy E. Smith and colleagues named the type and only known species, Leptostomia begaaensis, based on these fossils. Leptostomia is a small pterosaur, with the complete skull length estimated between 6 and 20 centimeters (2.4 and 7.9 in), making it much smaller than many contemporary pterosaurs. The beak of Leptostomia is remarkably long, narrow, and compressed from the top down, a morphology unseen in any other known pterosaur.

Due to a lack of remains, the exact classification of Leptostomia is uncertain; it has been recovered in various positions within Azhdarchoidea, a group of edentulous (toothless) pterodactyloid pterosaurs. Leptostomia has been proposed to have a similar lifestyle to probe sensing birds like sandpipers and sanderlings due to its beak anatomy and paleoenvironment.

The Leptostomia fossils were found in rock layers of the Ifezouane Formation, which is part of the Kem Kem beds. This environment was made up of river systems, tidal flats, and mangroves, which would have supported a diverse fauna of invertebrates like crabs and worms. If it was a probe feeder, Leptostomia likely would have preyed on these invertebrates. The Kem Kem beds preserve a variety of other fossils, including several other genera of pterosaurs, as well as fossils of dinosaurs, crocodylomorphs, mammals, lizards, turtles, fish, and more.

== Discovery and naming ==
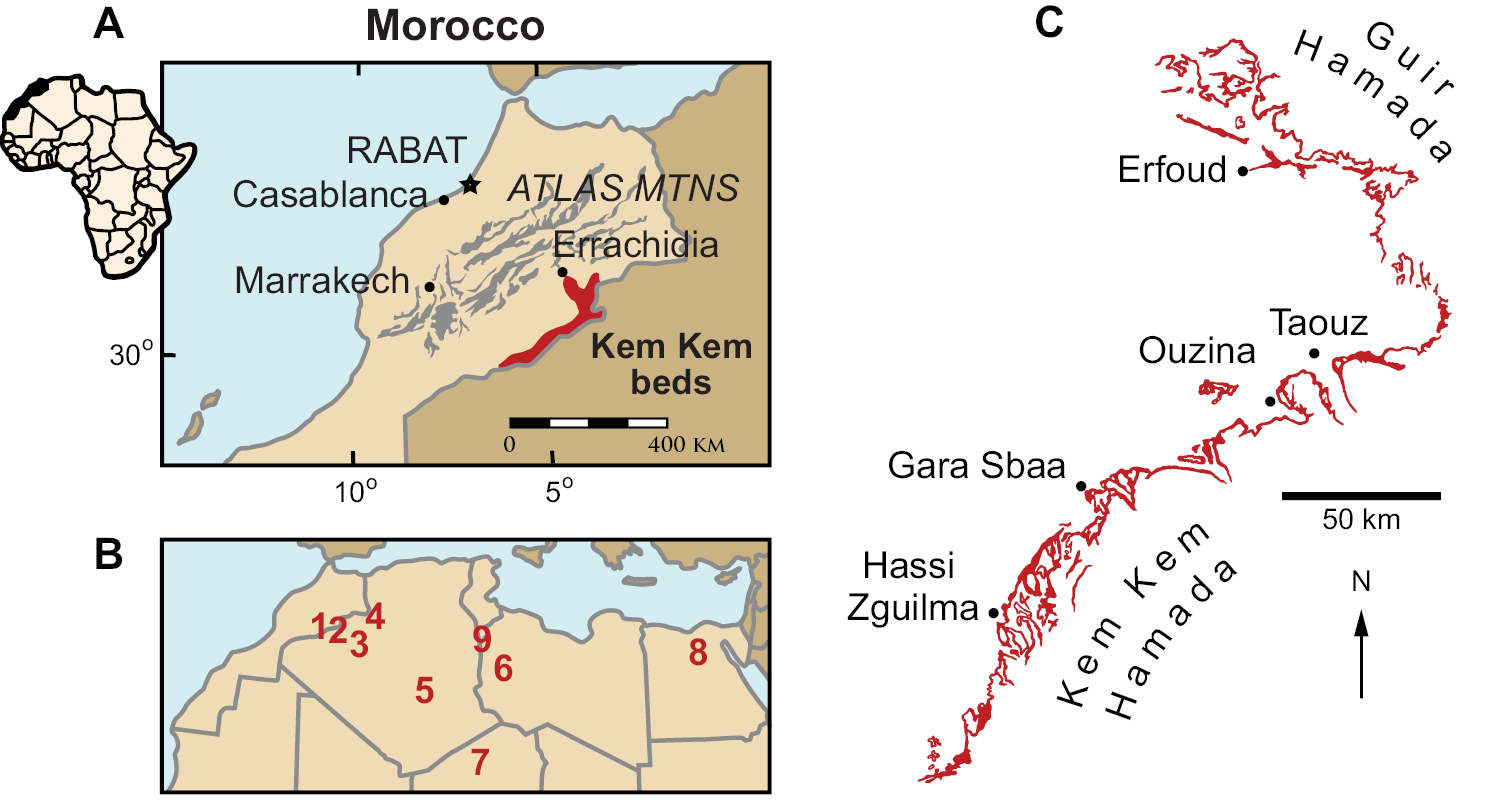
Geographical setting of the Kem Kem region and outcrops, with Kem Kem and Guir Hamadas outcrops in red

For decades, southern Morocco has produced pterosaur fossils in large numbers. Fossils of Leptostomia were first unearthed in an outcrop near the town of Hassi El Begaa in Errachidia Province, southern Morocco. The remains found are from two specimens, both of which come from the same site and were accessioned at the Faculté des Sciences Aïn Chock. The holotype (name-bearing) specimen, FSAC-KK 5075, is an incomplete rostrum (upper beak), and the paratype (supporting defining) specimen, FSAC-KK 5076, is an incomplete dentary (lower beak). The preserved portions of these elements are missing their anterior (toward the front) ends; an estimated 7 centimetres (2.8 in) is missing from the rostrum and 3.5 cm (1.4 in) from the dentary, assuming these bones tapered evenly, like in other azhdarchoids. These fossils were found at an outcrop corresponding to the upper horizon of the Ifezouane Formation of the Kem Kem Beds, which dates to the Cenomanian and perhaps Albian stages of the Cretaceous.

In 2021, paleontologists Roy E. Smith, David Michael Martill, Alexander Kao, Samir Zouhri, and Nicholas R. Longrich described these remains as belonging to a new genus and species of pterosaur, which they named Leptostomia begaaensis. The generic name, Leptostomia, is a combination of the Ancient Greek words leptos, meaning "slender", and stoma, meaning "mouth". The specific name, begaaensis, refers to the oasis village Hassi El Begaa, near which both specimens were found.

== Description ==
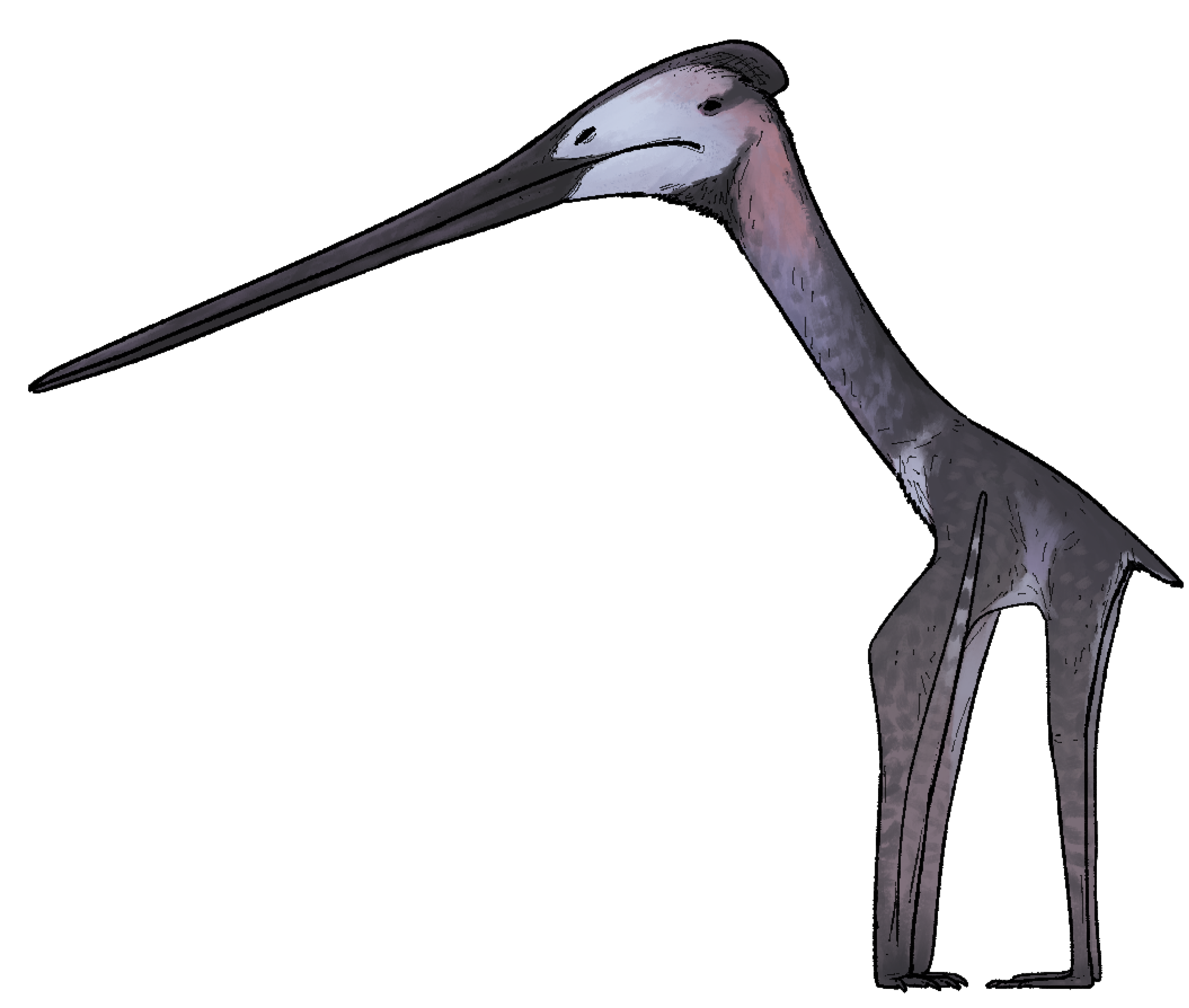
Speculative life restoration of Leptostomia

Leptostomia was a small, long-beaked pterosaur. The beak fragments of Leptostomia are dorsoventrally (from top to bottom) flattened with thick walls, as in other azhdarchoids. While many pterosaur beaks bear dorsal or ventral crests, Leptostomia lacks either in the preserved anterior section. This gives it a straight, featureless beak. The holotype upper jaw fragment of Leptostomia measures 48 millimeters (1.9 in) in length, indicating a skull length between 6 and 20 centimeters (2.4 and 7.9 in) long.

The rostrum of Leptostomia is extremely thin, measuring only 2.2 millimeters (0.087 in) deep at the front. The jaws are toothless, slightly upcurved, and anteriorly (toward the beak tip) tapered. The upper jaw had a narrow midline ridge on the bottom surface, similar to that seen in many other pterosaurs, which would have occluded with a groove in the upper surface of the lower jaw. The ridge on the occlusal (inside) surface of the rostrum extends across the length of the rostrum. However, it is more pronounced towards the posterior (back) end. Many small, slit-like foraminae can be found on the outside and occlusal surfaces of the mandible, similar to those of other azhdarchoids. The ventral margin of the mandible is gently rounded in cross-section, in contrast to the U-shaped or sharp margins present in the other pterosaurs Alanqa and Xericeps.

Leptostomia is distinguished from other pterosaurs by a combination of diagnostic traits. The cross-sections of the anterior rostrum and mandibular symphysis (the portion of the mandible where both halves meet) are semi-circular, in contrast to triangular or U-shaped cross-sections seen in contemporary pterosaurs. The lateral (side) and dorsal (top) rostral angles (angles of the beak's height) are less than or equal to 3 degrees, a number much lower than that of beaked pterosaurs like Quetzalcoatlus and Pteranodon. Distinctly, this number is closer to those of toothed pterosaurs rather than other edentulous pterosaurs; the only pterosaur with a lower rostral angle is the toothed Ctenochasma. The beak of Leptostomia has thick cortices (bone walls) and a small central cavity (hollow space in the middle of the jaw). These cortices measure 2 millimetres (0.079 in) thick and surround the central cavity.

== Classification ==
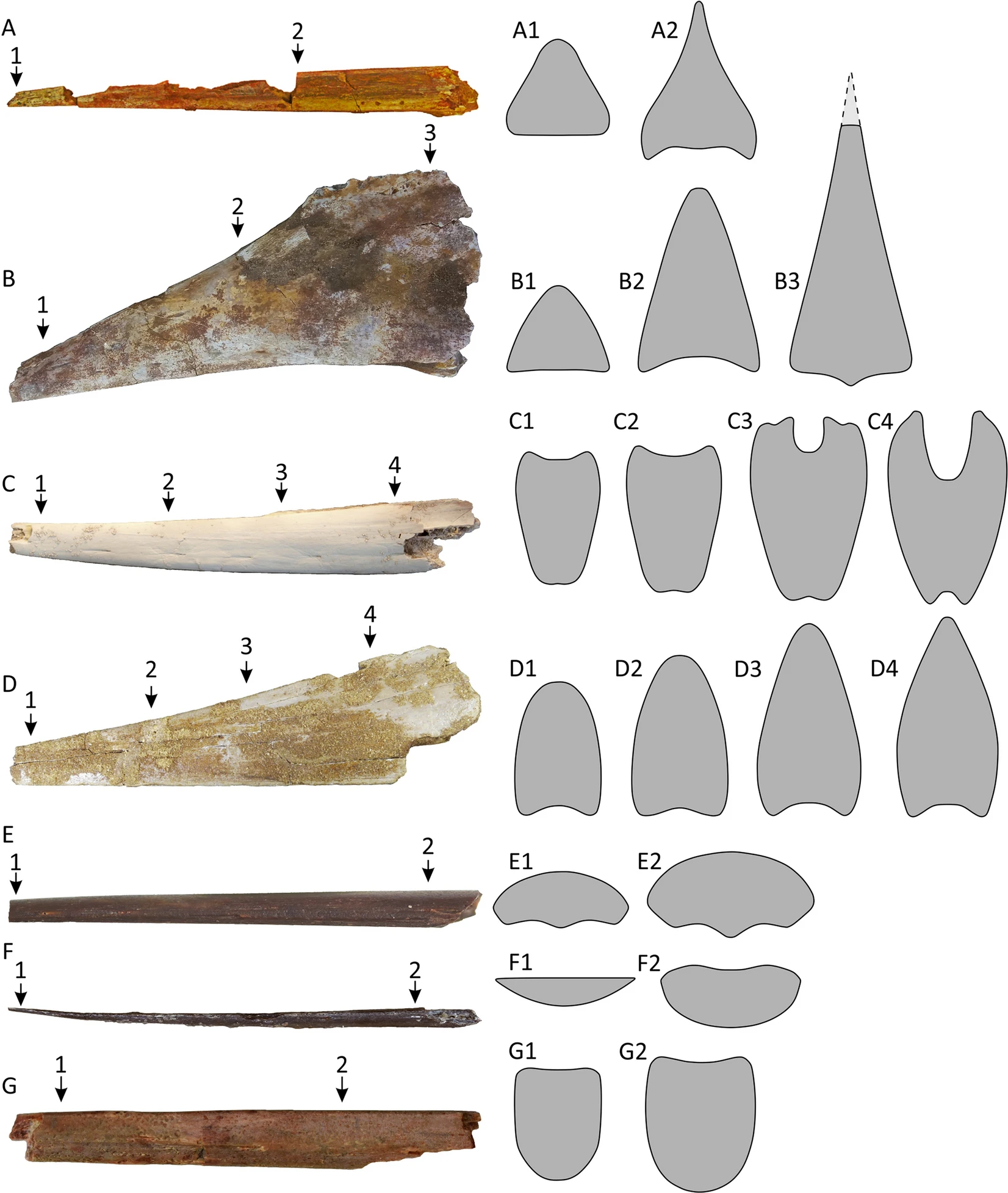
Beak cross-sections of various Kem Kem Group pterosaurs, including the rostrum (E) and mandible (F) of Leptostomia

Due to its fragmentary nature and unique anatomy, the affinities of Leptostomia are unclear; in their 2020 description of Leptostomia, Smith and colleagues proposed that the genus was a member of the Pterodactyloidea within the clade Azhdarchoidea, a clade of pterosaurs that existed during the Cretaceous period with a global distribution. The authors made this claim based on the lack of alveoli (tooth sockets), the presence of thick cortices, the dorsoventral compression of the beak, and the distribution of foramina in the fossil material, all of which are found in azhdarchoids. Azhdarchoids are very diverse, including the families Tapejaridae, Azhdarchidae, Chaoyangopteridae, Thalassodromidae, and possibly Dsungaripteridae. These pterosaurs are edentulous and had wing proportions adapted to a more terrestrial life, in contrast to their relatives the pteranodontians.

The placement of Leptostomia within Azhdarchoidea is unclear, with multiple placements having been proposed. Large-scale phylogenetic analyses focused on pterosaur relationships that include Leptostomia recover it as a particularly close relative of Xericeps, with Argentinadraco and Alanqa as other closely related taxa. However, Smith and colleagues (2023) expressed skepticism toward published phylogenetic results due to the fragmentary nature of the Leptostomia material. In an analysis published in 2021, Brian Andres recovered these taxa as derived members of the Thalassodromidae, with the clade formed by Leptosomia and Xericeps diverging after subsequent branches of Alanqa and Argentinadraco. These results are displayed in Topology 1 below.

In contrast, the results of Pêgas (2024) placed these four genera within a distinct monophyletic clade, named the Alanqidae, with the Leptostomia-Xericeps clade sister to one formed by Alanqa and Argentinadraco. Members of this clade are characterized by their bowed-out lateral (side) jaw margins in cross-section and a pair of occlusal ridges on the lower jaw. In a publication on the phylogenetic relationships of azhdarchoids, Thomas & McDavid (2025) used an extensively updated matrix to recover a topology for Alanqidae identical to the earlier results of Pêgas (2024). These results are shown in Topology 2 below.

Topology 1: Andres (2021)

- Azhdarchoidea
  - Tapejaridae
  - - Dsungaripteromorpha
      - Dsungaripteridae
      - Thalassodromidae
        - Tupuxuara
        - - Thalassodromeus
          - - Alanqa
            - - Argentinadraco
              - - Leptostomia
                - Xericeps
    - Neoazhdarchia
      - Chaoyangopteridae
      - Azhdarchiformes
        - Radiodactylus
        - - Montanazhdarcho
          - Azhdarchidae

Topology 2: Thomas & McDavid (2025)

- Azhdarchoidea
  - Tapejaromorpha
  - Azhdarchomorpha
    - Inabtanin
    - Microtuban
    - - RGM.631745
      - Concilazhia
        - Chaoyangopteridae
        - Azhdarchiformes
          - Alanqidae
            - - Alanqa
              - Argentinadraco
            - - Leptostomia
              - Xericeps
          - - - Montanazhdarcho
              - Radiodactylus
            - - Azhdarchidae

== Paleobiology ==
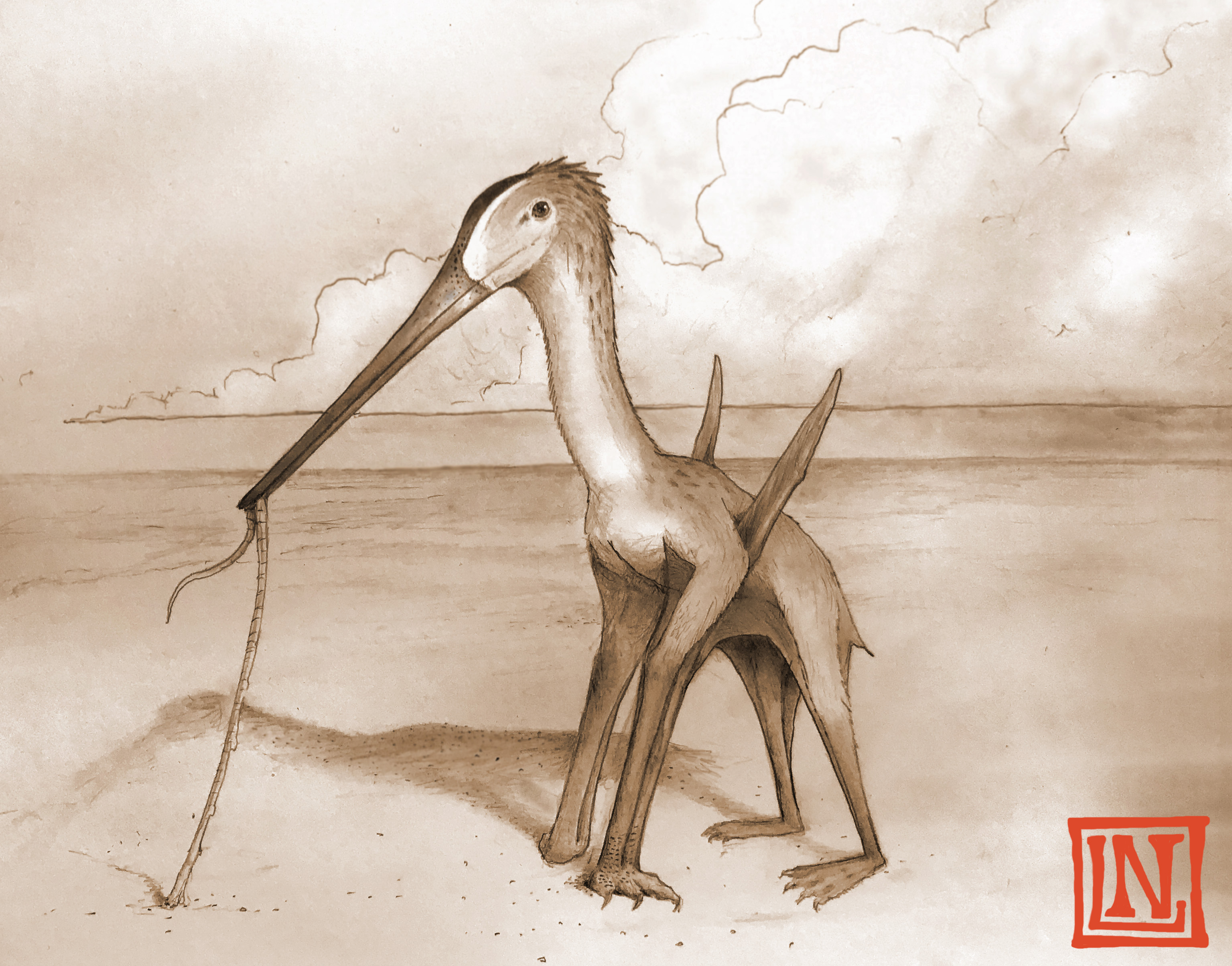
Speculative life restoration of a probing Leptostomia (by Nicholas Longrich, one of the describers)

In their 2021 description of Leptostomia, Smith and colleagues discussed the possible paleobiology of this taxon. It is unlike that of any previously described pterosaurs. Instead, it closely resembles extant (living) long-billed birds that feed by probing in sediment, such as kiwis, ibises, hoopoes, and snipes. These birds typically feed on invertebrates such as earthworms (in soil) or polychaete worms, fiddler crabs, or bivalves (in estuarine or marine intertidal settings). Additionally, these birds are specialized to hunt at different degrees of sediment probing.

Smith and colleagues hypothesized that Leptostomia was a probe feeder, like curlews, woodcocks, and kiwis. Quetzalcoatlus, Pterodactylus, and tracks associated with the ichnotaxa Purbeckopus and Pteraichnus have also been suggested to be probe feeders or show evidence of this behavior. However Leptostomia is the only known pterosaur to have a beak morphology consistent with a probe feeding lifestyle. The beak of Leptostomia displays the cross-section and long, narrow, and dorsoventrally compressed morphology similar to that of the sanderling, a remote sensing probing shorebird. Leptostomia also bears thick bone walls in its beak, an adaptation for stress-resistance during probing. Although not preserved in any known specimens, the occurrence of foramina in the beak tip would further suggest a probing lifestyle, as they would function as another non-visual method of prey detection. The Kem Kem beds environment from which Leptostomia is known provides further evidence for this behavior; the Kem Kem beds are a river system that preserves a diverse freshwater fauna. Small molluscs such as Unio spp., fiddler crabs and other crustaceans, and worms are preserved in the beds, and could have provided a food source.

In addition to Leptostomia, all other alanqid azhdarchoids bear adaptations to molluscivory or probe feeding, and they may represent a Gondwanan group of coastal and riparian azhdarchoids, with each taxon filling a different niche in the Kem Kem ecosystem.

== Paleoecology ==
During the Early to Middle Cretaceous, North Africa bordered the Tethys Sea, which transformed the region into a mangrove-dominated coastal environment filled with tidal flats and waterways. The Kem Kem beds are a sequence of fluvial and lacustrine sediments, though it has some marine sediments. Isotopes from fossils of the dinosaurs Carcharodontosaurus and Spinosaurus suggest that the Kem Kem beds witnessed a temporary monsoon season rather than constant rainfall, similar to modern conditions present in sub-tropical and tropical environments in Southeast Asia and Sub-Saharan Africa. The Izefouane Formation, the unit of the Kem Kem beds from which Leptostomia is known, has been interpreted as a braided river system, similar to that found in the Bahariya Formation. This river system was freshwater based on the presence of lungfishes and other typically freshwater vertebrates. This indicates that the Izefouane Formation had a wide variety of features, including river channels, river banks, sandbars, and more. These riverine deposits bore large fishes, including the sawskate Onchopristis, coelacanth Mawsonia, and bichir Bawitius. The Kem Kem beds also preserve many piscivorous crocodyliformes, such as the genera Elosuchus, Laganosuchus, and Aegisuchus.

Pterosaurs known from the Kem Kem beds include the azhdarchoid Alanqa, the possible azhdarchoid Xericeps, indeterminate azhdarchoids, the tapejarid Afrotapejara, the possible chaoyangopterid Apatorhamphus, and the ornithocheirids Akharhynchus, Anhanguera, Coloborhynchus, Nicorhynchus, Ornithocheirus, and Siroccopteryx. However, all of these pterosaurs are known from fragmentary and/or isolated remains, making their classification difficult to confirm. Many fossils have been found without overlap, such as vertebrae or limb bones, that may belong to these taxa. Dinosaurs are also known from the Kem Kem beds, including the sauropod Rebbachisaurus and the theropods Deltadromeus, Carcharodontosaurus, and Spinosaurus, in addition to unnamed ankylosaurs, titanosaurs, and noasaurid theropods.

== See also ==
- Timeline of pterosaur research
- 2021 in paleontology
- List of pterosaurs
