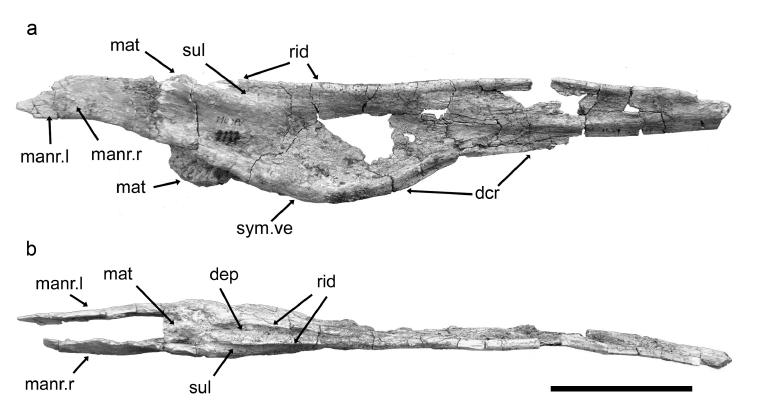
- The holotype lower jaw

Scientific classification
- Kingdom: Animalia
- Phylum: Chordata
- Class: Reptilia
- Order: †Pterosauria
- Suborder: †Pterodactyloidea
- Clade: †Azhdarchoidea
- Family: †Alanqidae
- Genus: †Argentinadraco; Kellner & Calvo 2017

Type species
- †Argentinadraco barrealensis Kellner & Calvo 2017

= Argentinadraco =

Argentinadraco Temporal range: Turonian-Coniacian ~91–88 Ma

Genus of azhdarchoid pterosaur from the Late Cretaceous

Argentinadraco (meaning "Argentina dragon") is an extinct genus of alanqid pterosaur from the Late Cretaceous Portezuelo Formation of Argentina. It contains a single species, A. barrealensis, named in 2017 by Alexander Kellner and Jorge Calvo. Argentinadraco is unusual for bearing a bottom jaw with a concave bottom edge, as well as a pair of ridges and depressions on the top surface. These features distinguish it from all other azhdarchoid groups, complicating its assignment, but recent phylogenetic analyses indicate that it belongs to the clade Alanqidae. The ridges on the lower jaw may have been used to feed on small invertebrates in loose sediment within the system of lakes and rivers that it resided in.

== Discovery and naming ==
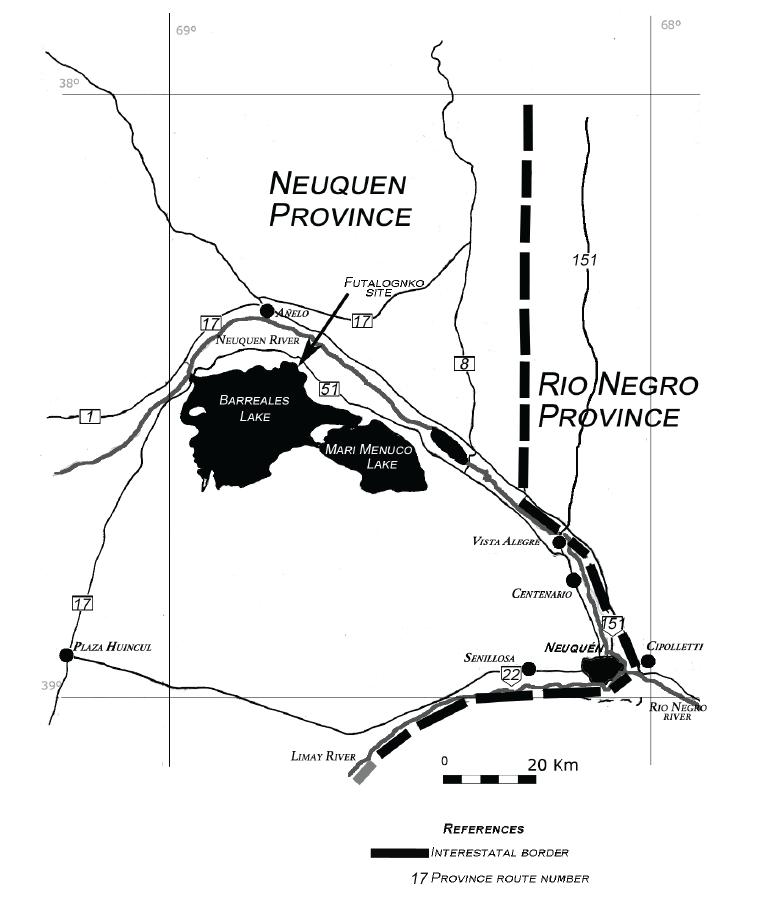
Map showing the location of the Futalognko quarry

Argentinadraco is known from a single partial lower jaw, missing the rear end. The specimen is also compressed, especially near the tip of the jaw. Catalogued as MUCPv-1137 in the Centro Paleontológico Lago Barreales (CePaLB) of the National University of Comahue, it was found in layers of yellow sandstone and red/green claystone within the Futalognko quarry, which is located on the northern shore of Lake Barreales. The quarry is 90 km (56 mi) northwest of Neuquén, in Neuquén Province, Patagonia, Argentina. Exposed deposits at the site belong to the Portezuelo Formation, a part of the Neuquén Group of the Neuquén Basin, that dates to the Turonian or Coniacian epochs of the Cretaceous period.

Alexander Kellner, Jorge Calvo, Juan Porfiri, and Domenica dos Santos briefly described the specimen in an abstract at the 2011 Fourth Latin American Congress of Vertebrate Paleontology. Kellner and Calvo would go on to describe and name the specimen formally in 2017. The genus name Argentinadraco is derived from Argentina plus the suffix -draco, from the Latin word for "dragon", while the species name barrealensis is a reference to the locality of Lake Barreales.

== Description ==
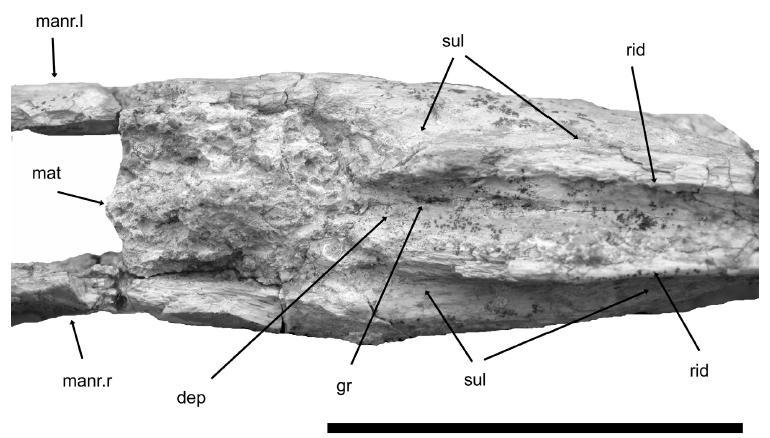
A closer view of the ridges and depressions at the back of the preserved jaw

The size of Argentinadraco is difficult to estimate, but the preserved segment of the lower jaw measures 259 mm (10.2 in) long. The symphysis of the lower jaw was likely long, taking up some 50% of the jaw's total length in life. The external cortical bone is thin, and the bones of the jaw are thoroughly fused, which characterizes Argentinadraco as a relatively derived (specialized) pterosaur.

While the top margin of the lower jaw is straight, like members of the Azhdarchidae, the bottom margin of the symphysis is deep (44 mm (1.7 in) tall) at the rear but becomes shallower in front, making it markedly concave. This sets Argentinadraco apart from other members of the Azhdarchoidea. The entire bottom margin is blunt and thickened. There is also, unusually, a small crest along the concave portion of the bottom margin, but it is not as developed as the crests of the Tapejaridae.

The top surface of the symphysis is bordered by blunt outer margins (unlike the sharp margins of Thalassodromeus), separated by a narrow depression. This depression becomes a concave shelf at the back of the jaw, and it is unusually flanked by a pair of well-developed ridges inset from the actual outer margins. The ridges are separated from the outer margins by narrow depressions. Most other toothless pterosaurs have a simple flattened or concave surface. There is a shallow pit, or fossa, at the back of the symphysis, caused by it ending in two segments as in Caupedactylus and Quetzalcoatlus.

== Classification ==
Although being toothless clearly places Argentinadraco in the Dsungaripteroidea sensu Kellner, more specifically within the Azhdarchoidea, its precise classification within this group is more elusive. Lower jaws of the Thalassodrominae, Chaoyangopteridae, and Azhdarchidae tend to be either very similar or radically divergent within the same group. The proportions of at least the front portion of the lower jaw of Argentinadraco resembles those of the azhdarchid Zhejiangopterus, and the chaoyangopterids Chaoyangopterus and Shenzhoupterus.

Argentinadraco bears differences, however, from all three groups. Its jaw is more robust and shorter than those of Quetzalcoatlus and some other azhdarchids. The deep rear end and the blunt ridges on the top surface also separate it from thalassodromines and chaoyangopterids. While the thalassodromine Tupuxuara has a crest on the bottom margin of its jaw, it does not have the shallow depression on the top surface. Kellner and Calvo tentatively assigned Argentinadraco to the Azhdarchidae based on provenance. It may instead represent an entirely new group, but this is difficult to test.

Nevertheless, Argentinadraco can be confidently excluded from the Pteranodontidae, Nyctosauridae, and Tapejarinae, the other groups of toothless dsungaripteroid pterosaurs. The back of the symphysis in Argentinadraco is deep like the pteranodontids, but the deepest point is further forward; the shelf of the symphysis is also inclined downwards instead of being arched as in pteranodontids, and the two-segment ending of the symphysis is not known in pteranodontids either. Nyctosaurids have an additional shelf on the symphysis, and the top margin of the lower jaw curves upwards. Finally, Argentinadraco does not have a downturned lower jaw, a step-like upper margin, or a deep crest, which all characterize tapejarines, and its jaw is much less robust.

A study focused on Aerotitan recovered it as a chaoyangopterid closely related to Xericeps. Both Argentinadraco and Xericeps have since been consistently recovered as members of the clade Alanqidae, which also includes Alanqa and Leptostomia, in both tapejarid and azhdarchid-focused phylogenetic analyses of azhdarchoids. The results of a phylogenetic analysis in a 2025 study of azhdarchoid relationships by Henry Thomas and Skye McDavid are shown below.

- Azhdarchoidea
  - Tapejaromorpha
  - Azhdarchomorpha
    - Microtuban
    - Inabtanin
    - - Chaoyangopteridae
      - Azhdarchiformes
        - - - Radiodactylus
            - Montanazhdarcho
          - Azhdarchidae
        - Alanqidae
          - - Leptostomia
            - Xericeps
          - - Alanqa
            - Argentinadraco

== Paleobiology ==
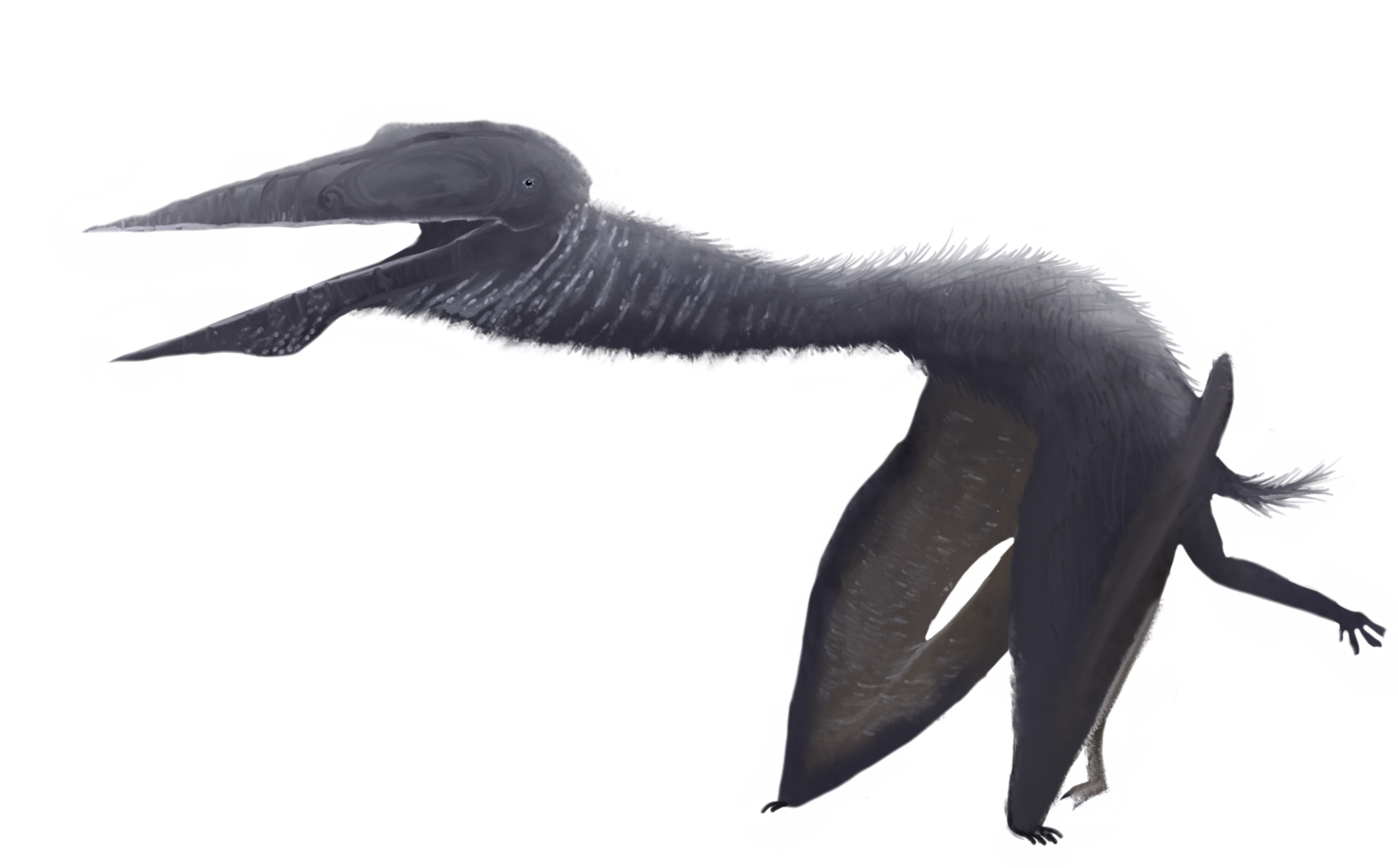
Life reconstruction

The unusually elaborate combination of ridges and depressions on the top surface of the lower jaw in Argentinadraco suggests that the lower jaw interlocked with the upper jaw in some way. Meanwhile, as has been inferred for Pteranodon, the depth of the rear of the symphysis suggests that it had strong bite forces. Kellner and Calvo speculatively suggested that Argentinadraco used its peculiar jaw to slice through loose sediment in the rivers or lakes of its environment, potentially feeding on small invertebrates such as crustaceans. They interpreted such a lifestyle as being consistent with the terrestrial feeding habits of azhdarchids.

== Paleoecology ==
A diverse assemblage of animals has been recovered from the Futalognko quarry, which represents a continental deposit. It was deposited in a humid environment, and represents a system of meandering rivers. Argentinadraco in particular was probably preserved after being trapped on a point bar by low-energy water flow. Pterosaurs are rare in the Futalognko quarry, but remains (including an ulna) have previously been assigned to the Azhdarchidae. Dinosaurs include the theropods Megaraptor and Unenlagia (alongside dromaeosaurid and carcharodontosaurid teeth), the sauropod Futalognkosaurus, and indeterminate iguanodontian ornithopods.

Additionally, a crocodylomorph similar to Comahuesuchus is also known from Futalognko, as are teeth of the Peirosauridae. Turtles of the group Pelomedusoidea have been found as well. Fish include a small member of the Euteleostei, two members of the Clupeomorpha, and a member of the Semionotidae, known from scales. Freshwater bivalves have also been found at Futalognko. Finally, plant fossils are dominated by angiosperms, specifically dicotyledons, but leaves and fruiting bodies from gymnosperms are also known alongside conifers.

== See also ==
- Timeline of pterosaur research
- List of pterosaurs
- 2018 in paleontology
