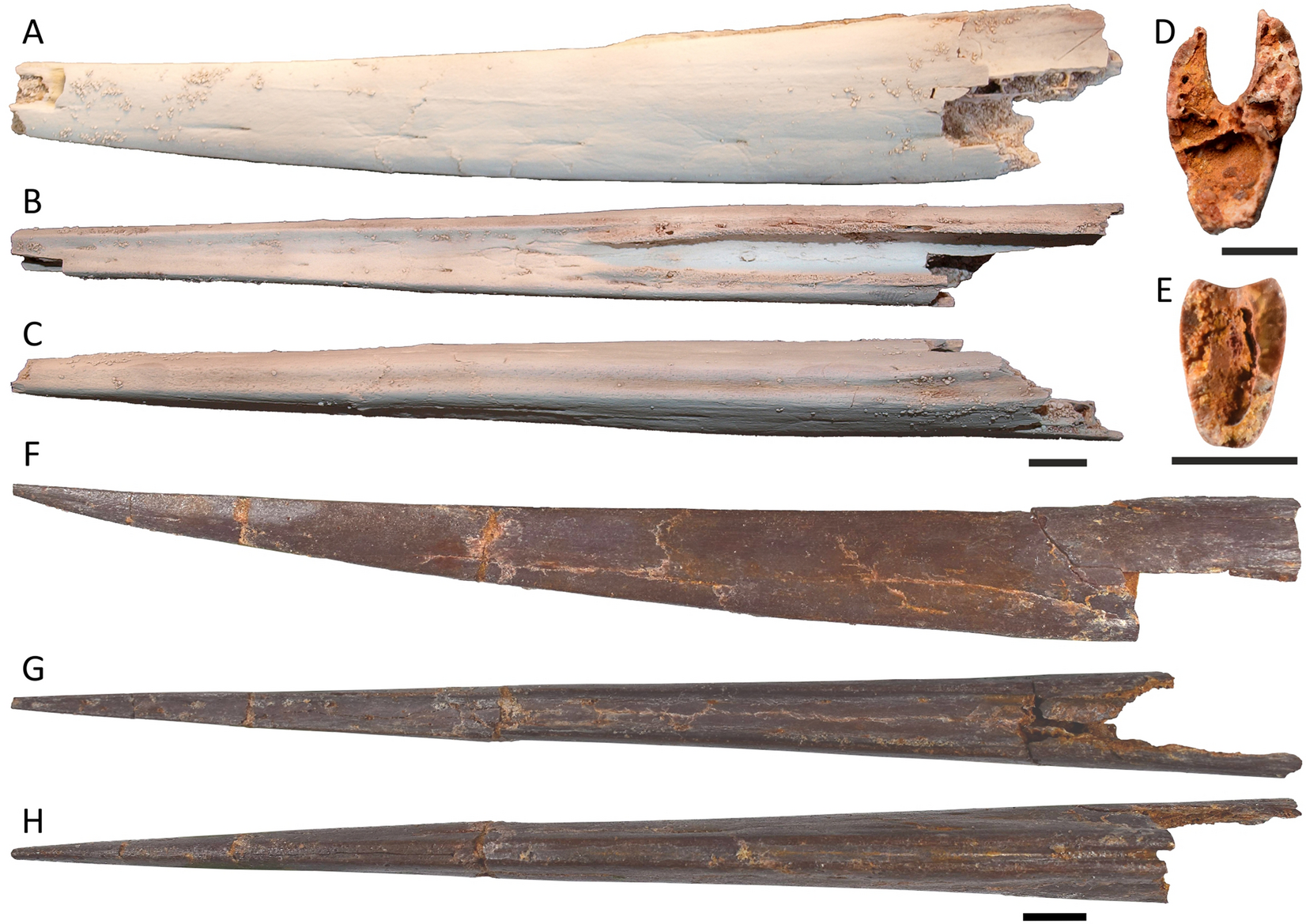
- Holotype (A–E) and referred specimen (F–H) specimens of Xericeps

Scientific classification
- Kingdom: Animalia
- Phylum: Chordata
- Class: Reptilia
- Order: †Pterosauria
- Suborder: †Pterodactyloidea
- Clade: †Azhdarchoidea
- Family: †Alanqidae
- Genus: †Xericeps; Martill et al., 2018

Type species
- †Xericeps curvirostris Martill et al., 2018

= Xericeps =

Xericeps Temporal range: Cenomanian

Genus of azhdarchoid pterosaurs

Xericeps is an extinct genus of alanqid pterosaur from the Cenomanian stage of the Late Cretaceous. It was discovered from the Kem Kem Beds of southeastern Morocco.

The name Xericeps comes from the Ancient Greek: ξερός - meaning dry, referencing the Sahara Desert, in which the pterosaur was first found, and the Latin: cep from capere, meaning "to catch" - alluding to the creature's forceps-like beak.

== Discovery and naming ==
The holotype specimen, FSAC-KK-10700, was discovered by local mine workers at Aferdou N'Chaft, a small mesa near the oasis village of Hassi el Begaa in the Errachidia Province in southeastern Morocco on the Algerian border, and consists only of the pterosaur's fragmented jaws. The specimen was purchased directly at the mine site by British palaeontologist David M. Martill in January 2017, and thus it was possible to confidently establish its precise locality and stratigraphic horizon.

It is believed that Xericeps lived in the mid-Cretaceous period around the Albian–Cenomanian ages (93.9–113.0 Ma).

The specific name, "curvirostris", comes from the Latin curvus, meaning "curved" and rostrum meaning snout, or muzzle, referencing the specimen's noticeably upward-curved beak.

== Description ==
Xericeps is a medium-sized edentulous (toothless) pterosaur. The term 'medium-sized', in the context of pterosaurs, is generally used to describe pterosaurs with a wingspan of 3–8 metres, and it is likely that Xericeps was nearer the lower end of this range.

The holotype specimen is a partial anterior lower jaw, broken off anterior to where the mandibular rami diverged. The jaw is upturned, with the occluding surface curved in lateral view. On the dorsal surface of the mandibular symphysis are a pair of ridges, similar to those seen in Alanqa and Argentinadraco.

== Classification ==
A 2021 study focused on Aerotitan recovered Xericeps as a chaoyangopterid closely related to Argentinadraco. Both Xericeps and Argentinadraco have since been consistently recovered as members of Alanqidae, which also includes Alanqa and Leptostomia, in both tapejarid and azhdarchid-focused phylogenetic analyses of azhdarchoids. The results of a phylogenetic analysis in a 2025 study of azhdarchoid relationships by Henry Thomas and Skye McDavid are shown below.

- Azhdarchoidea
  - Tapejaromorpha
  - Azhdarchomorpha
    - Microtuban
    - Inabtanin
    - - Chaoyangopteridae
      - Azhdarchiformes
        - - - Radiodactylus
            - Montanazhdarcho
          - Azhdarchidae
        - Alanqidae
          - - Leptostomia
            - Xericeps
          - - Alanqa
            - Argentinadraco

== See also ==
- Timeline of pterosaur research
- List of pterosaurs
- 2018 in paleontology
