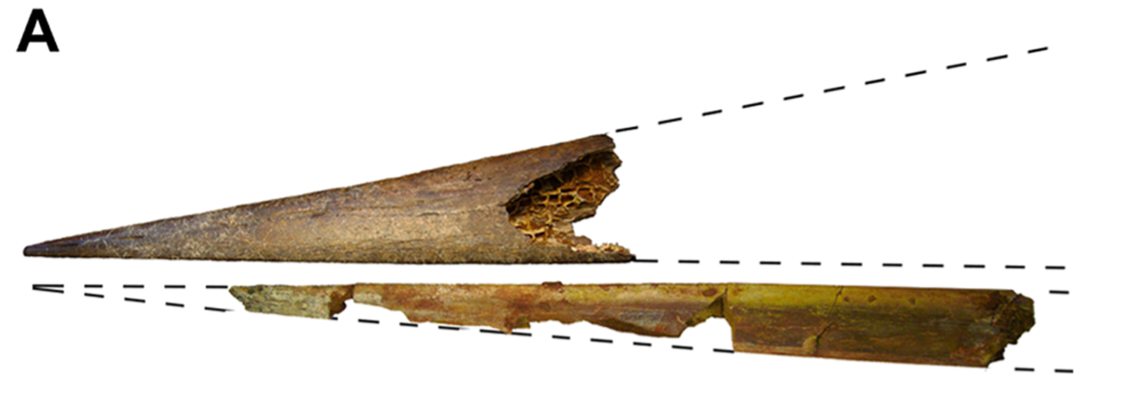
- Holotype jaws of Alanqa

Scientific classification
- Kingdom: Animalia
- Phylum: Chordata
- Class: Reptilia
- Order: †Pterosauria
- Suborder: †Pterodactyloidea
- Clade: †Azhdarchoidea
- Clade: †Azhdarchiformes
- Family: †Alanqidae; Pêgas et al., 2022

Genera
- †Alanqa; †Argentinadraco; †Leptostomia; †Xericeps

= Alanqidae =

Alanqids Temporal range: Cenomanian-Coniacian, 95–88 Ma

Family of azhdarchoid pterosaurs

Alanqidae is a group of azhdarchoid pterosaurs from the Late Cretaceous of North Africa and South America. It is defined as all pterosaurs more closely related to Alanqa saharica than to Chaoyangopterus zhangi (a chaoyangopterid) or Azhdarcho lancicollis (an azhdarchid).

== Description ==
Alanqids are united by their unique jaw anatomy that may have been used for probe feeding or a diet consisting of molluscs in riparian and coastal ecosystems. They are notable for surviving the Cenomanian-Turonian extinction that killed many forms of pterosaurs, though they did not survive to the end of the Cretaceous.

== Classification ==
Named in 2022 to contain Alanqa and Keresdrakon, the group has since been consistently recovered in both tapejarid and azhdarchid-focused phylogenetic analyses of azhdarchoids to include Alanqa, Leptostomia, and Xericeps from the Kem Kem Group of Morocco and Argentinadraco from the Portezuelo Formation of Argentina. The results of a phylogenetic analysis in a 2025 study of azhdarchoid relationships by Henry Thomas and Skye McDavid are shown below.

- Azhdarchoidea
  - Tapejaromorpha
  - Azhdarchomorpha
    - Microtuban
    - Inabtanin
    - - Chaoyangopteridae
      - Azhdarchiformes
        - - - Radiodactylus
            - Montanazhdarcho
          - Azhdarchidae
        - Alanqidae
          - - Leptostomia
            - Xericeps
          - - Alanqa
            - Argentinadraco
