= Inabtanin =

Inabtanin Temporal range: Late Cretaceous, Late Maastrichtian
- Skeletal reconstruction

Scientific classification
- Kingdom: Animalia
- Phylum: Chordata
- Class: Reptilia
- Order: †Pterosauria
- Suborder: †Pterodactyloidea
- Superfamily: †Ornithocheiroidea
- Clade: †Azhdarchoidea
- Genus: †Inabtanin; Rosenbach et al., 2024
- Species: †I. alarabia

Binomial name
- †Inabtanin alarabia Rosenbach et al., 2024

Genus of azhdarchoid pterosaurs

Inabtanin is an extinct genus of azhdarchoid pterosaurs from the Late Cretaceous Muwaqqar Formation of Jordan. The genus contains a single species, I. alarabia, known from a partial skeleton. Inabtanin represents one of the most complete pterosaur taxa known from the Afro-Arabia region.

== Discovery and naming ==
The Inabtanin holotype specimen, YUPC-INAB-6-001–010, was discovered in phosphate mines representing latest Maastrichtian-aged sediments of the Muwaqqar Formation ('Inab-6' locality) near Russeifa, Jordan. The specimen was found in partial articulation, consisting of much of the upper and lower jaws, four partial cervical vertebrae, the left scapulocoracoid and humerus, and much of the right forelimb (comprising the humerus, radius, ulna, fourth metacarpal, and first wing phalanx). The fossil material was first reported in a conference abstract in 2018 before its formal description.

In 2024, Rosenbach et al. described Inabtanin alarabia as a new genus and species of azhdarchoid pterosaurs based on these fossil remains. The generic name, Inabtanin, is derived from Tal Inab (meaning "grape hill" in Arabic)—the name of a notably grape-hued hill near the type locality—combined with "tanin", the Arabic word for "dragon". The name further makes use of the English word "tannin"—derived from the French "tanin"—which concerns coloration. As such, the intended meaning is both "grape dragon" and "grape-colored". The specific name, alarabia, references the Arabian Peninsula.

== Description ==
Size compared to a human

Based on fusion of the scapulocoracoid and appendicular bone epiphyses, the Inabtanin holotype can be identified as an adult individual. It is a large pterosaur, with an estimated wingspan of 5.35 metres (17.6 ft), slightly larger than the holotype of Quetzalcoatlus lawsoni. In comparison, fossils found near the Inabtanin holotype assigned to the azhdarchid Arambourgiania belong to animals with a larger wingspan of about 10 metres (33 ft). Inabtanin is the only non-azhdarchid azhdarchoid with a wingspan greater than 5 m (16 ft), indicating larger body size evolved prior to the more well-known giants within Azhdarchidae.

== Paleobiology ==
Using CT scans, Rosenbach et al. (2024) were able to observe the internal structure of the three-dimensionally preserved Inabtanin holotype bones. They found that—in contrast to the spiraling ridges in the humerus of the coeval Arambourgiania—Inabtanin demonstrates a densely packed crisscrossed arrangement of struts. Based on comparisons with extant birds, the flight patterns of the two extinct pterosaur taxa could then be deduced. Vultures and seabirds, which are known for their soaring capabilities, tend to have spiraling structures similar to Arambourgiania, suggesting it also primarily flew this way. The more conventional form of the Inabtanin bones is comparable to flapping birds.

== Classification ==
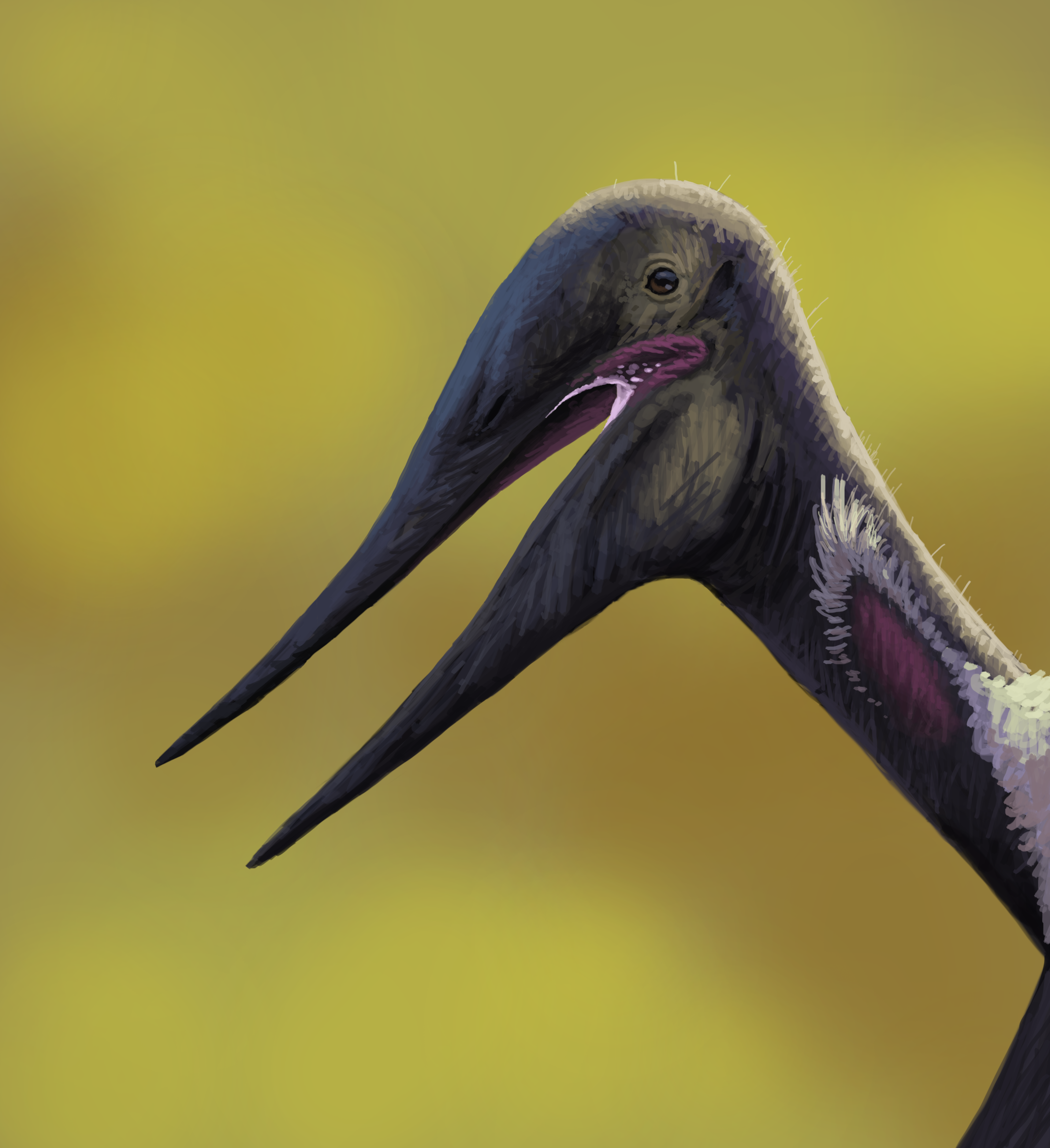
Speculative life restoration

While Rosenbach and colleagues (2024) refrained from analyzing Inabtanin in a formal phylogenetic context, they noted that some characteristics observed in the taxon, including the toothless beak, large body size, humerus morphology, and internal wing bone structure, are typically expected in azhdarchid taxa. However, the neck vertebrae are not extremely elongated, and there are no nutrient foramina on the jaw bones. These traits are more similar to non-azhdarchid members of the broader clade Azhdarchoidea, suggesting a more basal position for this genus.

In 2025, Thomas and McDavid published the results of a comprehensive azhdarchoid-focused phylogenetic analysis of pterosaurs. They recovered Inabtanin in an unresolved polytomy at the base of Azhdarchomorpha alongside fellow African pterosaur Microtuban and the clade including the unnamed specimen RGM.681745 and the more exclusive clade Concilazhia (which includes chaoyangopterids, alanqids, azhdarchids, and their closest relatives). These results are displayed in the cladogram below:

- Azhdarchoidea
  - Tapejaromorpha
  - Azhdarchomorpha
    - Inabtanin
    - Microtuban
    - - RGM.681745
      - Concilazhia
        - Chaoyangopteridae
        - Azhdarchiformes
          - Alanqidae
          - - - Radiodactylus
              - Montanazhdarcho
            - Azhdarchidae
              - Phosphatodraconia
              - - - Zhejiangopterus
                  - - Aerotitan
                    - Mistralazhdarcho
                    - MC SF69
                - - Azhdarcho
                  - Quetzalcoatlinae
                    - Cryodrakon
                    - - Hatzegopterygia
                      - Quetzalcoatlini
