= Vivian de Buffrénil =

French histologist and paleobiologist

- Born: October 28, 1950 (age 75); Pointe-à-Pitre, Guadeloupe, France
- Education: Doctorate 1980, Pierre-and-Marie-Curie University
- Occupation: Histologist
- Employer(s): Muséum National d'Histoire Naturelle, Paris
- Title: Maître de Conférences

Vivian de Buffrénil is a French histologist and paleobiologist who has worked at the Muséum National d'Histoire Naturelle in Paris from 1982 to 2021. His doctorate (1980) and his doctorat d'état (1990), a diploma now replaced by the habilitation, were supervised by Armand de Ricqlès. His main fields of interest include basic histological descriptions, growth dynamics as recorded in bone growth marks, and adaptation (both histological and microanatomical) of the tetrapod skeleton to a secondarily aquatic lifestyle. He is also interested in life history and population dynamics of exploited or threatened reptile taxa, especially among Varanidae and Crocodilia. He has published at least 92 papers, including 76 research papers, 10 reports on exploited or threatened species, and six popular papers.

His first papers dealt with the skeletal growth marks in extant crocodilians, but very soon after that, he also tackled paleobiological issues, such as growth of an Eocene crocodilian then identified as Crocodylus cf. affinis. Other extinct taxa on which he has published include the Ypresian crocodilian Dyrosaurus phosphaticus, thalattosuchian crocodilians, the Triassic presumed ichthyosaur Omphalosaurus nisseri, other ichthyosaurs, the Permian diapsid Claudiosaurus germaini, champsosaurids, the placodont Placodus, Plesiosauria, the early snakes Simoliophis and Eupodophis, and the mosasaur Carentonosaurus mineaui among reptiles, and early cetaceans and sirenians among mammals. While his early papers typically dealt with only one or two taxa each, some of his most recent studies are based on comparative datasets including several taxa. His most recent contribution is a large co-edited book.

As a recognized leader in bone histology, he evaluates drafts regularly for several journals and serves on the editorial board (as Reviewing Editor) of the Comptes Rendus Palevol of the Académie des sciences (France). On April 23, 2025, his work had been cited 5835 times in scholarly works, according to Google Scholar.
