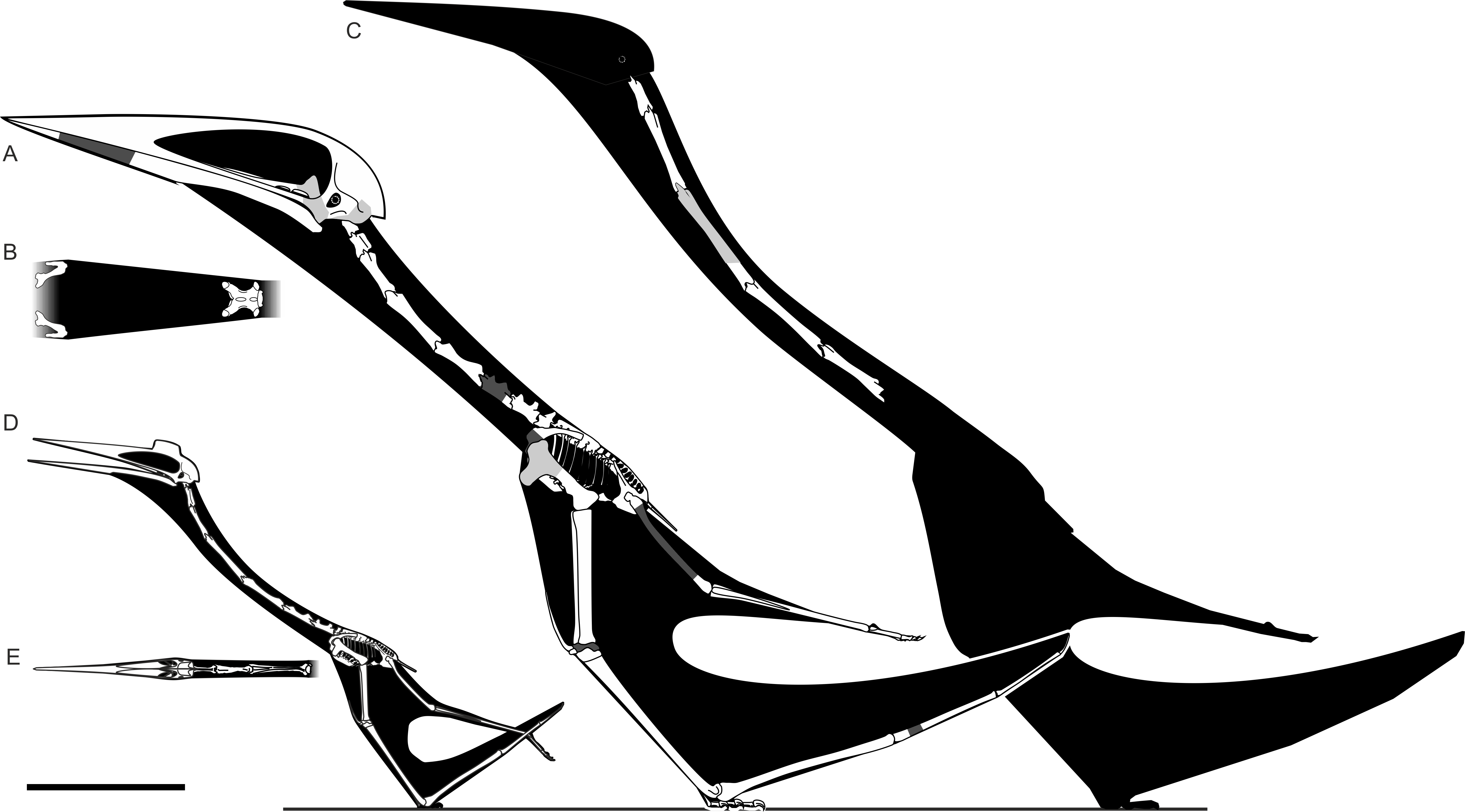
- Reconstructed skeletons of the azhdarchids Hatzegopteryx (A-B), Arambourgiania (C), and Quetzalcoatlus (D-E)

Scientific classification
- Kingdom: Animalia
- Phylum: Chordata
- Class: Reptilia
- Order: †Pterosauria
- Suborder: †Pterodactyloidea
- Clade: †Azhdarchoidea
- Clade: †Azhdarchiformes
- Family: †Azhdarchidae; Nesov, 1984

Type species
- †Azhdarcho lancicollis Nesov, 1984

Genera
See genera
- †Aerotitan
- †Azhdarcho
- †Mistralazhdarcho
- †Navajodactylus?
- †Samrukia?
- †Volgadraco
- †Zhejiangopterus
- † Phosphatodraconia Pêgas et al., 2025
  - †Aralazhdarcho
  - †Eurazhdarcho
  - †Phosphatodraco
  - †Wellnhopterus
- † Quetzalcoatlinae Andres, Clark, & Xu, 2014
  - †Cryodrakon
  - † Hatzegopterygia Pêgas et al., 2025
    - †Albadraco
    - †Bakonydraco?
    - †Galgadraco
    - †Hatzegopteryx
    - †Tsogtopteryx
  - † Quetzalcoatlini Pêgas et al., 2025
    - †Gobiazhdarcho
    - †Nipponopterus
    - †Serpennata Thomas & McDavid, 2025
      - †Arambourgiania
      - †Infernodrakon
      - †Quetzalcoatlus
      - †Thanatosdrakon

Synonyms
- "Titanopterygiidae" Padian, 1984 (preoccupied)

= Azhdarchidae =

Azhdarchids Temporal range: Cretaceous, 111–66 Ma

Family of large azhdarchoid pterosaurs

Azhdarchidae (named after the azhdar, اژدر, a dragon-like creature in Persian mythology) is a family of pterosaurs known mostly from the Late Cretaceous. Azhdarchids include the largest flying animals discovered, but smaller cat-size members have also been found. Originally considered a sub-family of Pteranodontidae, Nesov (1984) named the Azhdarchinae to include the pterosaurs Azhdarcho, Quetzalcoatlus, and Titanopteryx (now known as Arambourgiania). They were among the last known surviving members of the pterosaurs, and were a rather successful group with a worldwide distribution. Previously it was thought that by the end of the Cretaceous, most pterosaur families except for the Azhdarchidae disappeared from the fossil record, but recent studies indicate a wealth of other pterosaurian fauna based on several pteranodontian fossils from the latest Cretaceous period.

== Description ==
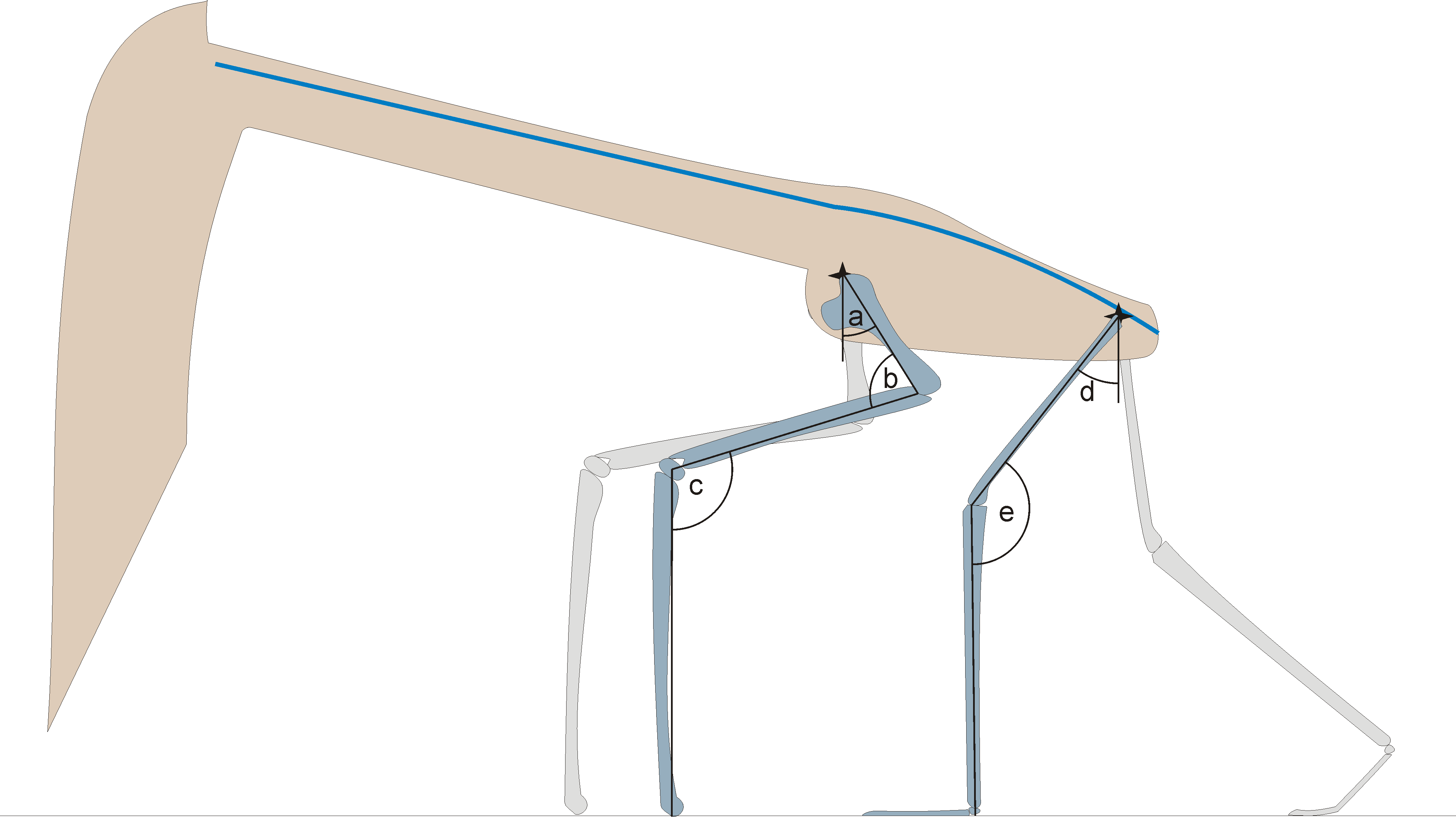
Reconstructed feeding posture of an azhdarchid with sagittally (longitudinally) aligned limbs

Azhdarchids are characterized by their long legs and extremely long necks, made up of elongated neck vertebrae which are round in cross section. Most species of azhdarchids are still known mainly from their distinctive neck bones and not much else. The few azhdarchids that are known from reasonably good skeletons include Zhejiangopterus and Quetzalcoatlus. Azhdarchids are also distinguished by their relatively large heads and long, spear-like jaws. There are two major types of azhdarchid morphologies: the "blunt-beaked" forms with shorter and deeper bills and the "slender-beaked" forms with longer and thinner jaws.

It had been suggested azhdarchids were skimmers, but further research has cast doubt on this idea, demonstrating that azhdarchids lacked the necessary adaptations for a skim-feeding lifestyle, and that they may have led a more terrestrial existence similar to modern storks and ground hornbills. Most large azhdarchids probably fed on small prey, including hatchling and small dinosaurs; in an unusual modification of the azhdarchid bodyplan, the robust Hatzegopteryx may have tackled larger prey as the apex predator in its ecosystem. In another departure from typical azhdarchid lifestyles, the jaw of Alanqa may be an adaptation to crushing shellfish and other hard foodstuffs.

Azhdarchids are generally medium- to large-sized pterosaurs, with the largest achieving wingspans of 10–12 metres (33–39 ft), but several small-sized species have recently been discovered. Another azhdarchid that is currently unnamed, recently discovered in Transylvania, may be the largest representative of the family thus far discovered. This unnamed specimen (nicknamed "Dracula" by paleontologists), currently on display in the Altmühltal Dinosaur Museum in Bavaria is estimated to have a wingspan of 12–20 m (39–66 ft), although similarities to the contemporary azhdarchid Hatzegopteryx have also been noted.

== Systematics ==
Azhdarchids were originally classified as close relatives of Pteranodon due to their long, toothless beaks. Others have suggested they were more closely related to the toothy ctenochasmatids (which include filter-feeders like Ctenochasma and Pterodaustro), but this classification is largely obsolete. Currently it is widely agreed that azhdarchids were closely related to pterosaurs such as chaoyangopterids, thalassodromids, and tapejarids, all of which belong to the superfamily Azhdarchoidea.

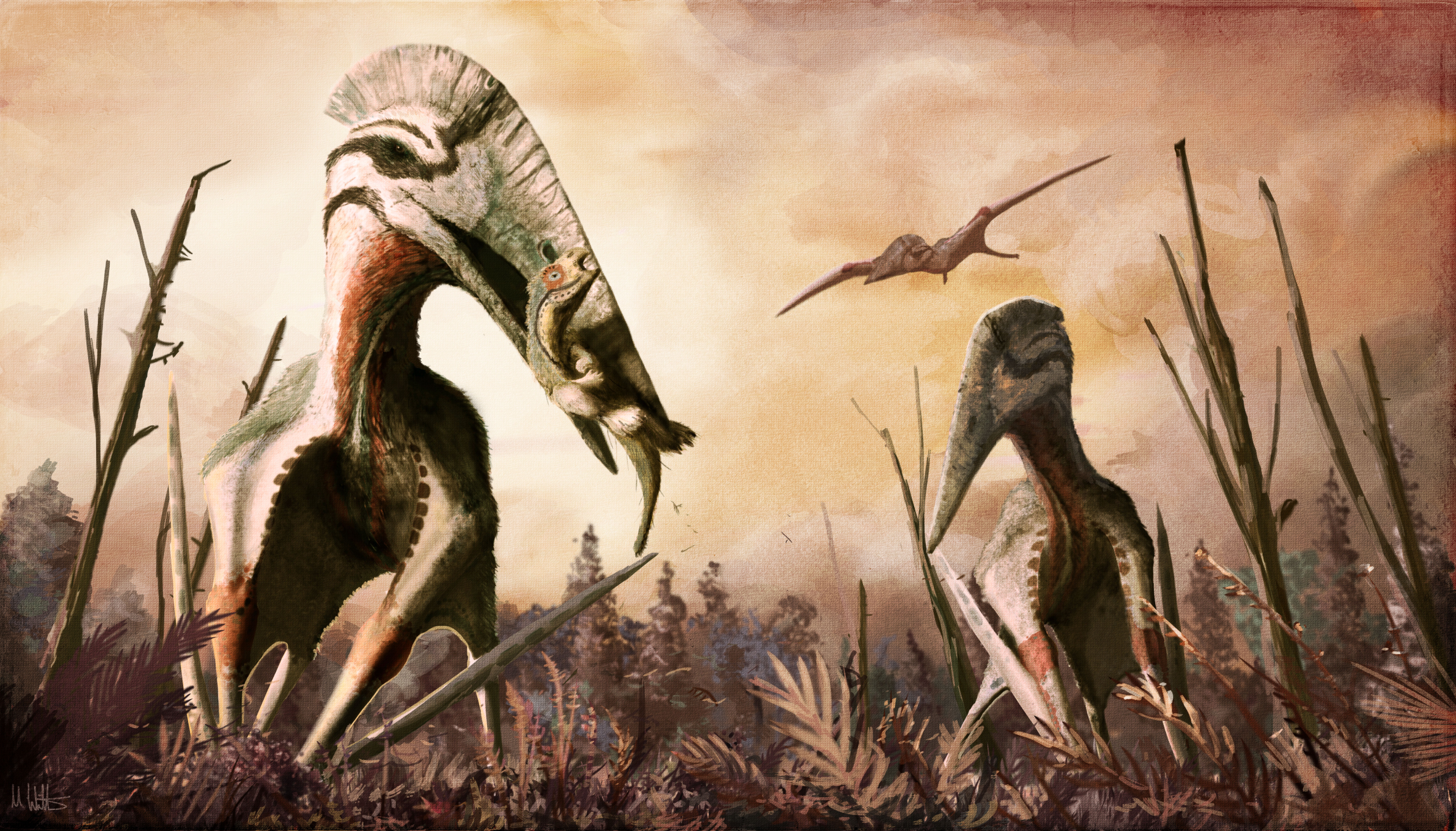
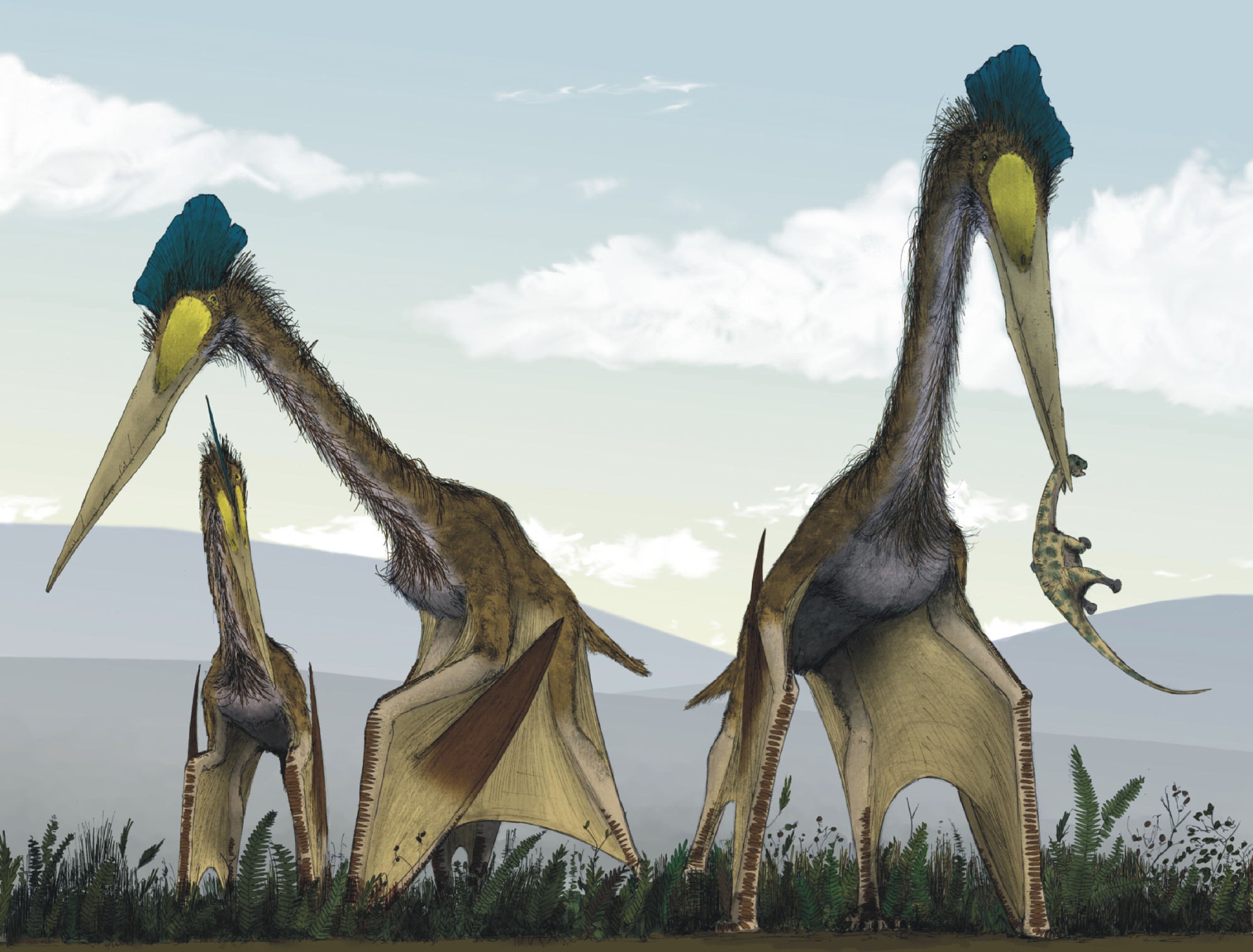
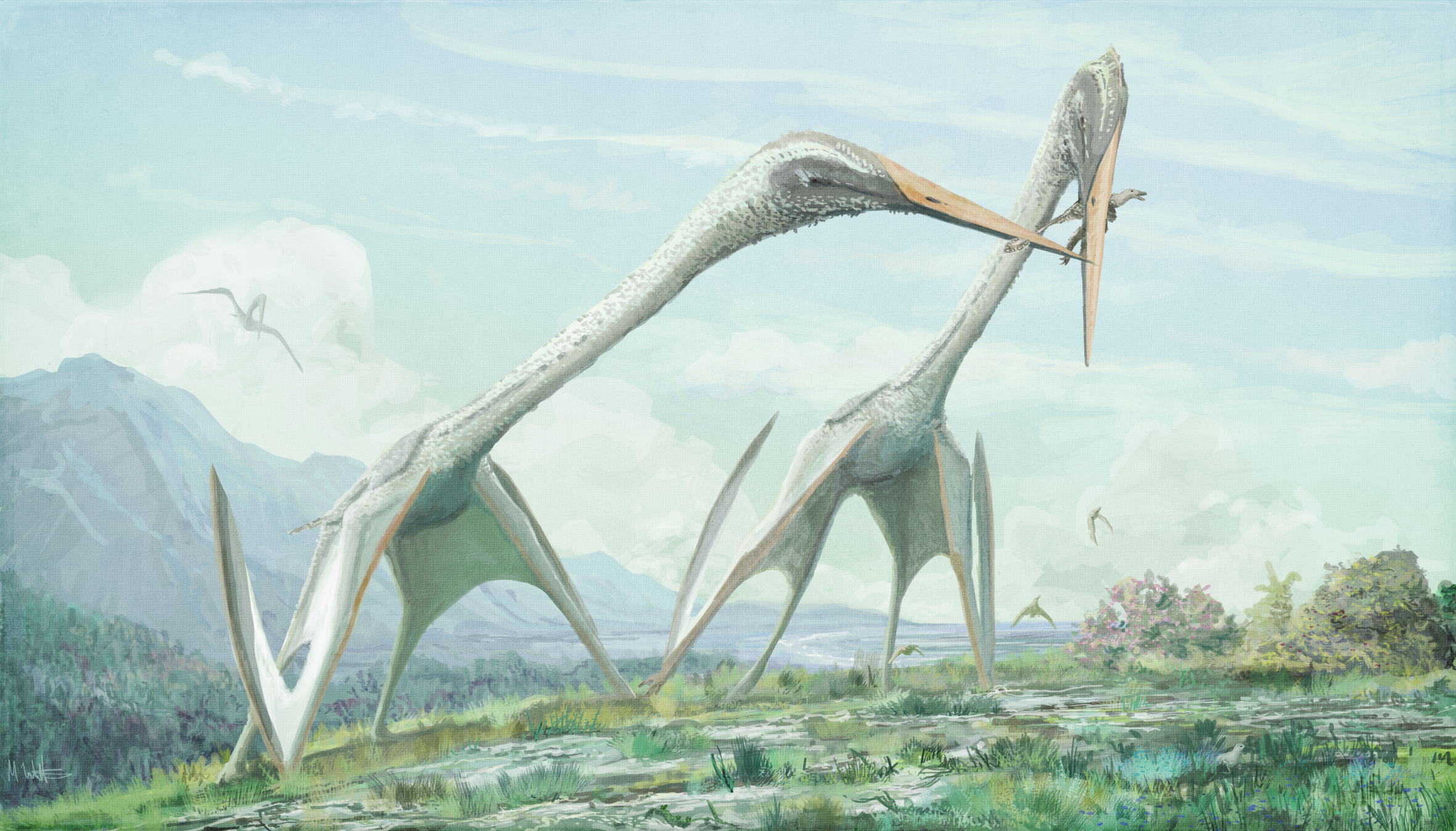
Life reconstructions of the giant azhdarchids Hatzegopteryx (left), Quetzalcoatlus (middle), and Arambourgiania (right) attempting to feed on the ground

=== Phylogeny ===
Two of the most complete phylogenetic results that include the family Azhdarchidae are presented below. The first, published in 2021 by Brian Andres, recovered Montanazhdarcho as the sister taxon to Azhdarchidae within the clade Azhdarchiformes. Within Azhdarchidae, two different subfamilies were recovered, the Azhdarchinae and the Quetzalcoatlinae. The former contains azhdarchids closer related to Azhdarcho and are smaller in size, while the latter contains azhdarchids closer to Quetzalcoatlus and are generally much larger in size.

- Azhdarchiformes
  - Radiodactylus langstoni
  - - Montanazhdarcho minor
    - Azhdarchidae
      - Azhdarchinae
        - Azhdarcho lancicollis
        - - Albadraco tharmisensis
          - - Aerotitan sudamericanus
            - Mistralazhdarcho maggii
      - Quetzalcoatlinae
        - - Aralazhdarcho bostobensis
          - Phosphatodraco mauritanicus
        - - Eurazhdarcho langendorfensis
          - - Zhejiangopterus linhaiensis
            - - Wellnhopterus brevirostris
              - Cryodrakon boreas
              - - Hatzegopteryx thambema
                - - Arambourgiania philadelphiae
                  - - Quetzalcoatlus lawsoni
                    - Quetzalcoatlus northropi

In a more comprehensive 2025 study (using a phylogenetic matrix modified from Pêgas (2024) and Zhou et al. (2025).), Pêgas et al. recovered Azhdarchidae as the sister taxon to the family Alanqidae within the clade Azhdarchiformes. The authors also proposed an updated nomenclatural scheme for azhdarchids, including the naming of three new clades. Herein, the new clade Quetzalcoatlida was preferred over Quetzalcoatlinae, comprising the new clades Hatzegopterygia (taxa closer to Hatzegopteryx than Quetzalcoatlus) and Quetzalcoatlini (taxa closer to Quetzalcoatlus than Hatzegopteryx). Quetzalcoatlida comprised more azhdarchid genera within it, while the subfamily Azhdarchinae was not recovered. Various azhdarchids found within the Quetzalcoatlinae by Andres in 2021 have been found as non-quetzalcoatlidans in this study. These include Aralazhdarcho, Eurazhdarcho, Wellnhopterus, and Phosphatodraco, which together form the newly named subgroup Phosphatodraconia, as well as Zhejiangopterus, Mistralazhdarcho, and Aerotitan, which form another unnamed subgroup. Azhdarcho is recovered as the sister taxon to Quetzalcoatlida.

In 2025, Henry N. Thomas and Skye N. McDavid performed an extensive revision of pterosaur phylogenetics with a focus on Azhdarchomorpha. Their results aligned with the previous analyses by Pêgas et al. (2025) in supporting the clades Phosphatodraconia, Hatzegopterygia, and Quetzalcoatlini. Thomas and McDavid informally recognized the clade comprising Zhejiangopterus, Mistralazhdarcho, and Aerotitan as the 'Zhejiangopterus clade'. The results differ, however, in finding Quetzalcoatlus to be polyphyletic, with the type species Q. nothropi being sister to Thanatosdrakon while Q. lawsoni claded in a polytomy with the 'Tous pterosaur' and other unnamed specimens that was recovered as sister to Thanatosdrakon and Q. nothropi. They also name the clade Serpennata which includes all the quetzalcoatlins with extremely elongate necks, excluding Nipponopterus and Gobiazhdarcho. Within this clade, the authors recognized two main groupings: the 'Arambourgiania clade' (comprising Arambourgiania and Infernodrakon) and the 'Quetzalcoatlus clade' (comprising Q. nothropi, Thanatosdrakon, and Q. lawsoni). A reproduction of their phylogenetic tree is provided below:

- Azhdarchiformes
  - Alanqidae
    - - Leptostomia begaaensis
      - Xericeps curvirostris
    - - Alanqa saharica
      - Argentinadraco barrealensis
  - - - - Radiodactylus langstoni
        - Montanazhdarcho minor
    - Azhdarchidae
      - Phosphatodraconia
        - Aralazhdarcho bostobensis
        - - Eurazhdarcho langendorfensis
          - - Wellnhopterus brevirostris
            - Phosphatodraco mauritanicus
      - - 'Zhejiangopterus clade'
          - Zhejiangopterus linhaiensis
          - - Mistralazhdarcho maggii
            - Aerotitan sudamericanus
            - MC SF69
        - - Azhdarcho lancicollis
          - Quetzalcoatlinae
            - Cryodrakon boreas
            - - Hatzegopterygia
                - Tsogtopteryx mongoliensis
                - - Albadraco tharmisensis
                  - - Bakonydraco spp.
                    - LPB R.2395 ('Pui azhdarchid')
                    - - Hatzegopteryx thambema
                      - LPB R.2347
                      - EME 315 ('Râpa Roşie azhdarchid')
              - Quetzalcoatlini
                - - Nipponopterus mifunensis
                  - Gobiazhdarcho tsogtbataari
                - Serpennata
                  - MPCA PV 2003 ('Candeleros Azhdarchid')
                  - 'Arambourgiania clade'
                    - Infernodrakon hastacollis
                    - - MPPM 2000.23.1 (Arambourgiania sp.)
                      - Arambourgiania philadelphiae
                  - 'Quetzalcoatlus clade'
                    - - Thanatosdrakon amaru
                      - Quetzalcoatlus nothropi
                    - - 'Tous pterosaur'
                      - ME1 04
                      - UCMP 114286
                      - FSAC-OB 14 (aff. Quetzalcoatlus)
                      - Quetzalcoatlus lawsoni

=== Former and possible azhdarchid genera ===
There have been many pterosaur genera that were once assigned to the Azhdarchidae, but have since been reassigned to other pterosaur groups. Alanqa and Argentinadraco, for example, have sometimes been referred to Azhdarchidae, but recent phylogenetic studies have recovered these as either forming their own family, the Alanqidae, or within the family Thalassodromidae. The genus Bakonydraco, also initially classified as an azhdarchid, has been recovered as a tapejarid in many recent studies. Volgadraco and Bogolubovia, both assigned to this family in at least one study, are currently considered pteranodontians. The pterosaur Montanazhdarcho has also been reclassified as a non-azhdarchid, with phylogenetic analyses recovering it as either an alanqid, or as a basal azhdarchiform.

The genus Navajodactylus was tentatively assigned to this family, but its status has been questioned. The pterosaur Tethydraco has been suggested to have been an azhdarchid in one study, but this assignment has not been found in other analyses, with most finding it as a pteranodontian. Additionally a questionable basal azhdarchid was described from the Campanian aged Grünbach Formation of Austria.
