= Armand de Ricqlès =

French paleontologist (born 1938)

- Born: 23 December 1938 (age 87); Brussels, Belgium
- Education: doctorate 1963, University of Paris
- Employer: Collège de France (retired)
- Title: Professor of Historical and Evolutionary Biology (retired)

Armand de Ricqlès is a French paleontologist best known for his work in bone histology and its implications for the growth of dinosaurs (e.g.).

== Biography ==
=== Early life ===
He was born on 23 December 1938 in Brussels, Belgium. He obtained his first university degree in natural sciences from the University of Paris in 1960, and his doctorate in 1963. His thesis was supervised by Marcel Prenant, and focused on histology.

He also did a larger "Doctorat d'état" (a degree that no longer exists but that was required at the time to supervise doctoral students or for academic advancement). That thesis was published as several papers in the Annales de Paléontologie.

=== Career ===
He worked in the University of Paris from 1961 (before completing his thesis, as was then customary in France) till 1995, when he was nominated to the Historical and Evolutionary Biology Chair of the Collège de France. He officially retired in 2010, but he continues publishing. By the time that he retired, he had published 104 scientific papers and about 120 semi-popular papers. By 2010, his work had received at least 1575 ISI citations.

Armand de Ricqlès initially worked on the functional significance of extant histodiversity, and applied this newly gained knowledge in paleobiological inferences. He has collaborated with several other histologists and paleontologists, including Timothy G. Bromage, John R. Horner, and Kevin Padian. In his career, he influenced several students, but he formally trained a single doctoral student, Vivian de Buffrénil, who is currently working in the Muséum National d'Histoire Naturelle in Paris.

Through these collaborations, he has studied the growth, physiology, habitat (aquatic to terrestrial) and other paleobiological aspects of various limbed vertebrates. He has also made some contributions to the history of bone histology, and has written some papers on the problems facing French scientists because of the infamous French bureaucracy.
