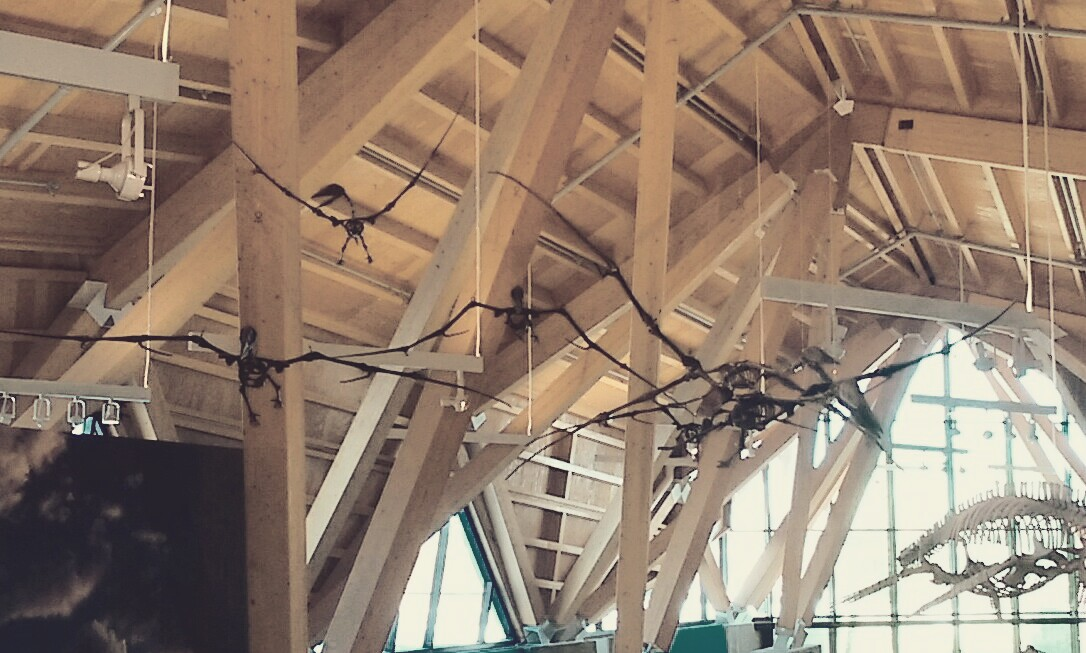
- Reconstructed skeletons

Scientific classification
- Kingdom: Animalia
- Phylum: Chordata
- Class: Reptilia
- Order: †Pterosauria
- Suborder: †Pterodactyloidea
- Clade: †Azhdarchoidea
- Genus: †Montanazhdarcho; Padian, de Ricqlès & Horner, 1995

Type species
- †Montanazhdarcho minor Padian, de Ricqlès & Horner, 1995

= Montanazhdarcho =

Montanazhdarcho Temporal range: Late Cretaceous, 74 Ma

Genus of azhdarchoid pterosaur from the Late Cretaceous

Montanazhdarcho is a genus of azhdarchoid pterosaur from the Late Cretaceous period (Campanian stage) of what is now the state of Montana, United States. Montanazhdarcho is known from only one species, M. minor.

== Discovery ==
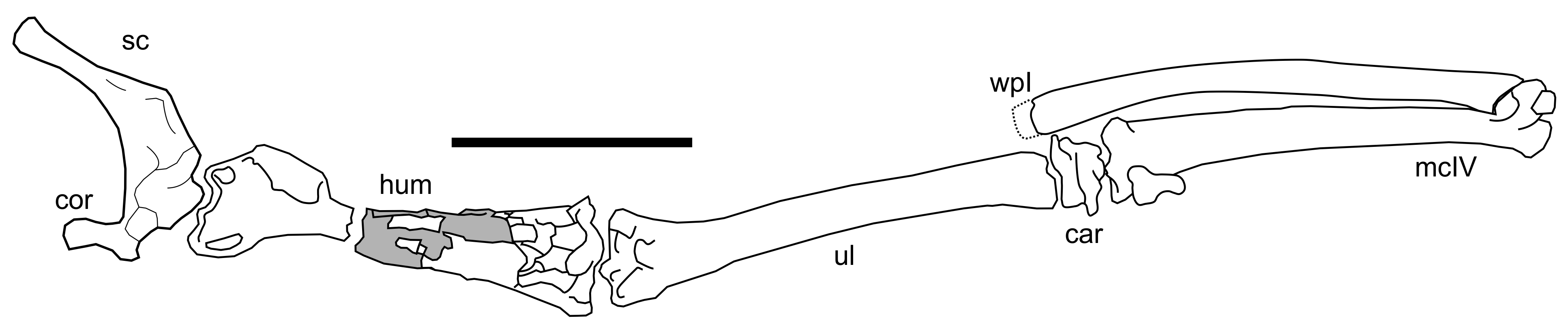
Holotype pectoral girdle and left forelimb

The holotype specimen, MOR 691 (Museum of the Rockies), was found by Robert W. Harmon in Glacier County, in the territory of the Blackfoot, in sandstone of the Upper Two Medicine Formation, a layer about 74 million years old. The genus name Montanazhdarcho was first given informally in 1993 by Kevin Padian, Armand de Ricqlès, and Jack Horner. It was then named formally in 1995 by the same researchers, and was fully described in 2002.

The type species is Montanazhdarcho minor. The generic name refers to the state of Montana and to the related species Azhdarcho. The specific name means "the smaller one" in Latin, a reference to the relatively small size in comparison to closely related forms.

== Description ==
Montanazhdarcho was a relatively small pterosaur, reaching 2.5 m (8.2 ft) in wingspan. The fossil is largely uncompressed and that of an adult exemplar, as established by a study of the bone by de Ricqlès. It consists of a partial left wing, lacking the outer three wing finger phalanges, a complete shoulder girdle, a crushed cervical vertebra and two fragments of the symphysis of the mandible. The jaws were edentulous, i.e. they lacked teeth.

== Classification ==
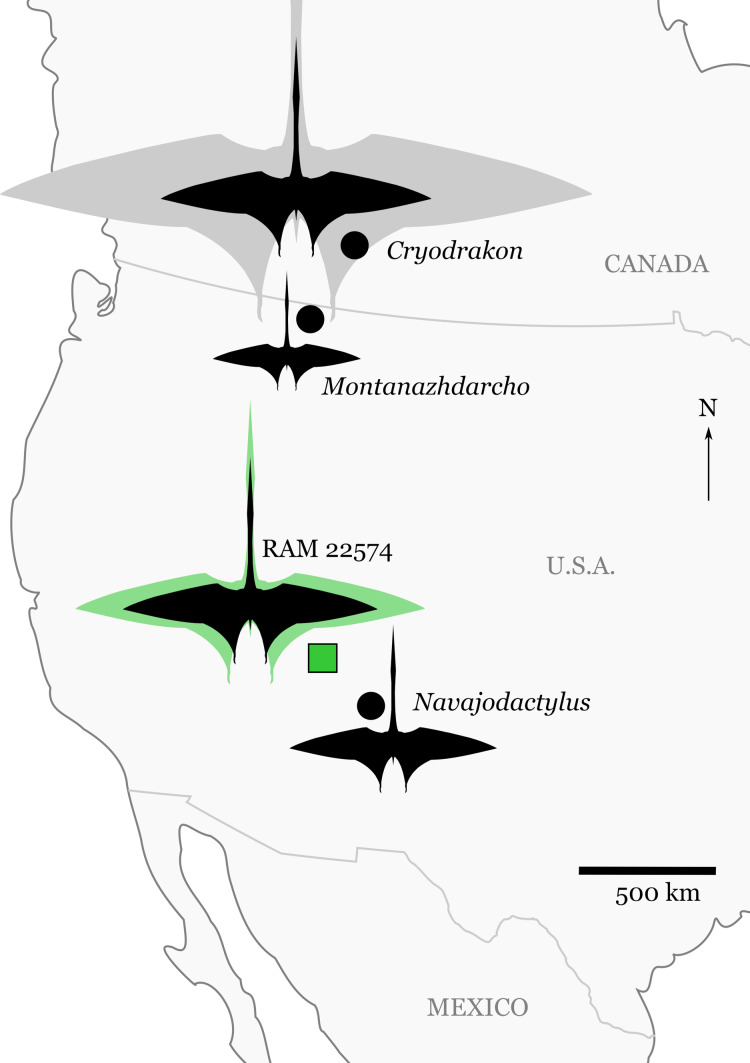
Location of the discovery of Montanazhdarcho (top; USA)

Montanazhdarcho was by the authors assigned to the Azhdarchidae, mainly based on the elongated form of the neck vertebra. Compared to other azhdarchids however, it was small; the fragments of humerus, radius, and carpal suggest an animal with a 2.5 m (8.2 ft) wingspan. Its ulna was longer than the wing metacarpal, which is atypical for azhdarchids. In addition to this, a phylogenetic study in 2015 has disagreed to its phylogenetic position, and reassigned Montanazhdarcho as a non-azhdarchid azhdarchoid. However, in 2018, Nicholas Longrich and colleagues had recovered Montanazhdarcho within the Azhdarchidae again, though placed in the basalmost position. Their phylogenetic analysis is shown below:

- Azhdarchidae
  - Montanazhdarcho
  - - Azhdarcho
    - - - Phosphatodraco
        - Aralazhdarcho
      - - Eurazhdarcho
        - - aff. Quetzalcoatlus
          - - Zhejiangopterus
            - - Arambourgiania
              - Hatzegopteryx
              - Quetzalcoatlus

In 2025, Thomas and McDavid recovered Montanazhdarcho as a non-azhdarchid azhdarchiform, specifically as a sister taxon of Radiodactylus.

== See also ==
- List of pterosaur genera
- Timeline of pterosaur research
