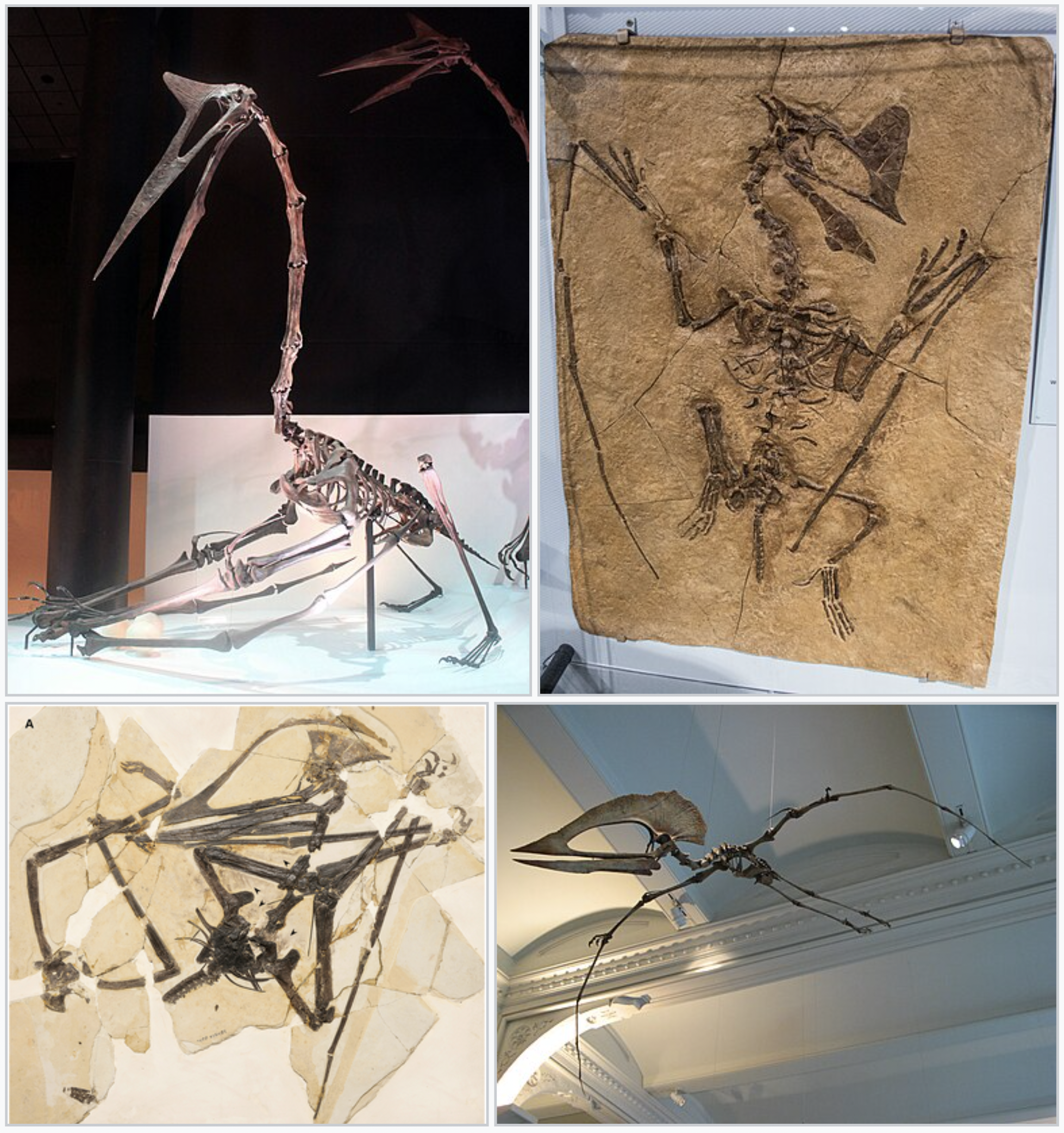
- Four azhdarchoids (clockwise from top left): Quetzalcoatlus, Tapejara, Tupuxuara, and Meilifeilong

Scientific classification
- Kingdom: Animalia
- Phylum: Chordata
- Order: †Pterosauria
- Suborder: †Pterodactyloidea
- Superfamily: †Ornithocheiroidea
- Clade: †Azhdarchoidea; Unwin, 1995

Subgroups
- †Keresdrakon; †Palaeocursornis?; †Tapejaromorpha Andres et al., 2014; †Rexarthuria; †Thalassodromidae; †Tapejaridae; †Caupedactylia; †Aymberedactylus; †Bennettazhia?; †Caupedactylus; †Azhdarchomorpha Pêgas et al., 2022; †Inabtanin; †Microtuban; †Montanazhdarcho; †Radiodactylus; †Alanqidae; †Azhdarchidae; †Chaoyangopteridae

= Azhdarchoidea =

Azhdarchoids Temporal range: Early - Late Cretaceous, 143–66 Ma Possible Late Jurassic record

Superfamily of pterodactyloid pterosaurs

Azhdarchoidea (/æʒdɑːrˈkɔɪdɪːə/, meaning "azhdarchid-like forms") is a group of pterosaurs within the suborder Pterodactyloidea. Pterosaurs belonging to this group lived throughout the Early and Late Cretaceous periods, with one tentative member, Tendaguripterus, that lived in the Late Jurassic period. Remains of this group have been found in the Americas, Africa, and Eurasia, suggesting that they probably had a global distribution.

Azhdarchoids are generally distinguished from other pterodactyloids by their relatively low arm-to-leg-length ratio, suggesting that they were more proficient in moving on the ground than pterosaurs like Pteranodon or Anhanguera (which had very long arms relative to the length of their legs). This has led some researchers to suggest that many azhdarchoids, such as the azhdarchids and dsungaripterids, may have been primarily terrestrial, while retaining the ability to fly when necessary.

== Classification ==
Azhdarchoidea was named by paleontologist David Unwin in 1995. He later gave the clade a phylogenetic definition in 2003. He defined the group as the most recent common ancestor of Quetzalcoatlus and Tapejara, and all its descendants.

=== Relationships ===
Azhdarchoidea is generally considered as one of three major clades of pterodactyloids. The other two major groups are Archaeopterodactyloidea and Pteranodontoidea. In some older classification schemes, azhdarchoids were considered to be closely related to ctenochasmatoids like Pterodactylus and Ctenochasma. However, most researchers no longer consider this arrangement to be very likely. Instead, azhdarchoids are grouped as close relatives of pteranodontoids under the clade Ornithocheiroidea, which would comprise the bulk of pterodactyloid diversity.

A simplified cladogram illustrating the relationships between azhdarchoids and other pterosaurs based on the analysis of Brian Andres, James Clark, and Xu Xing in 2014 is shown below.

- Monofenestrata
  - Darwinoptera
  - - Anurognathidae
    - Pterodactyloidea
      - - Archaeopterodactyloidea
        - - Azhdarchoidea
          - Pteranodontoidea

=== Taxonomy ===
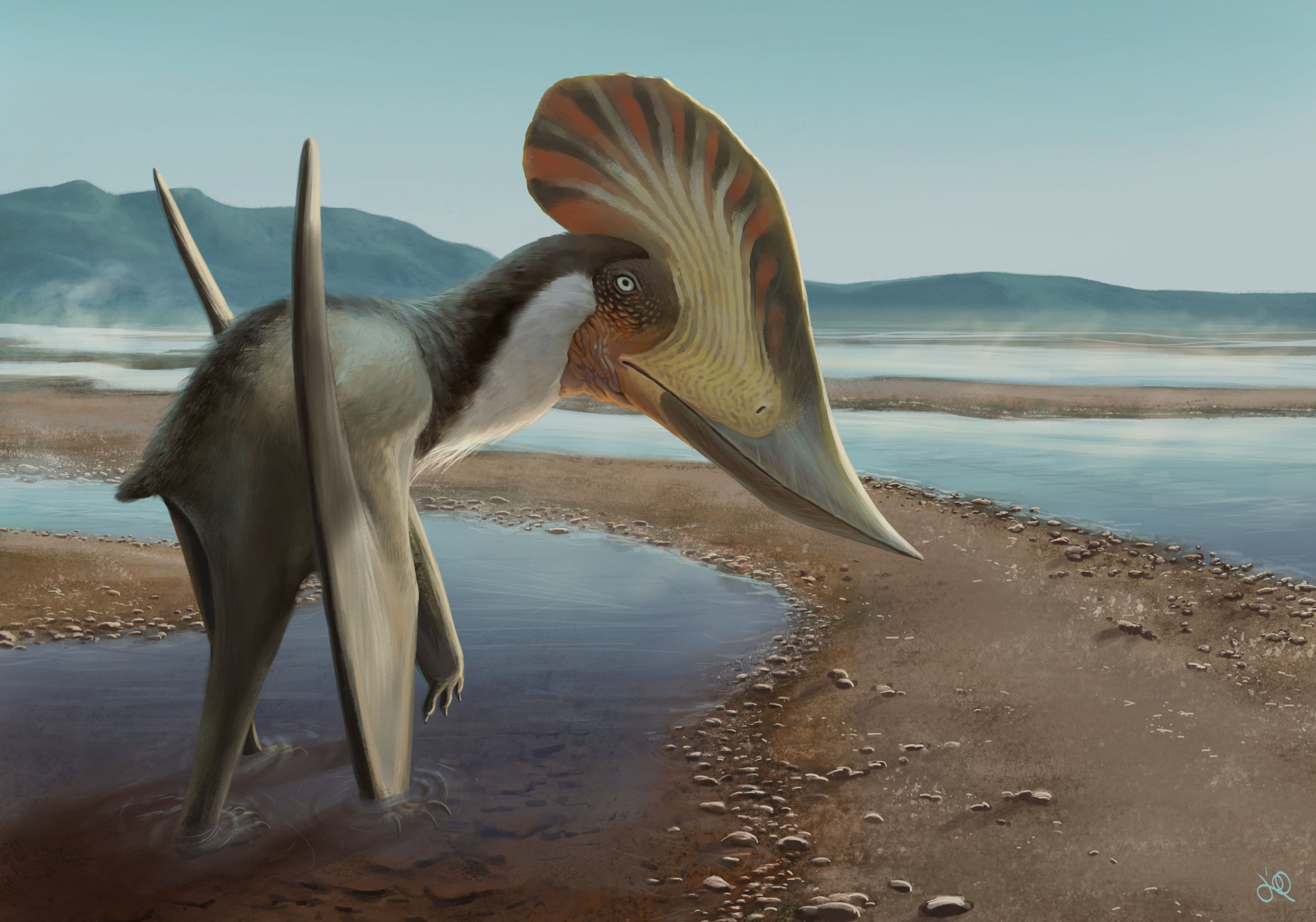
Kariridraco, a member of the disputed family Thalassodromidae

Azhdarchoidea is generally believed to be composed of several principal families: Azhdarchidae, Chaoyangopteridae, Tapejaridae, Thalassodromidae, and potentially Dsungaripteridae, although Thalassodromidae of these is considered to be a lineage tapejarids by some researchers. However, the interrelationships of these groups is not confidently understood. The azhdarchids and chaoyangopterids are generally considered to be one another's closest relatives, but the affinities of tapejarids, thalassodromids, and dsungaripterids are controversial. Some researchers also consider an additional grouping, Alanqidae, composed of taxa formerly considered azhdarchids.

There are several competing views of azhdarchoid relationships. An early study presented by paleontologist Felipe Pinheiro and colleagues in 2011 considered the tapejarids to be a monophyletic clade including the thalassodromines and the chaoyangopterids (therein called "chaoyangopterines"). Other earlier studies, such as that of paleontologists Darren Naish & David Martill in 2006, and that of Lü Junchang and colleagues in 2008, considered the traditional "tapejarids" to be a paraphyletic grade of primitive azhdarchoids, with true tapejarids more basal, and the thalassodromines (alternatively called thalassodromids) and chaoyangopterids being successively more closely related to azhdarchids.

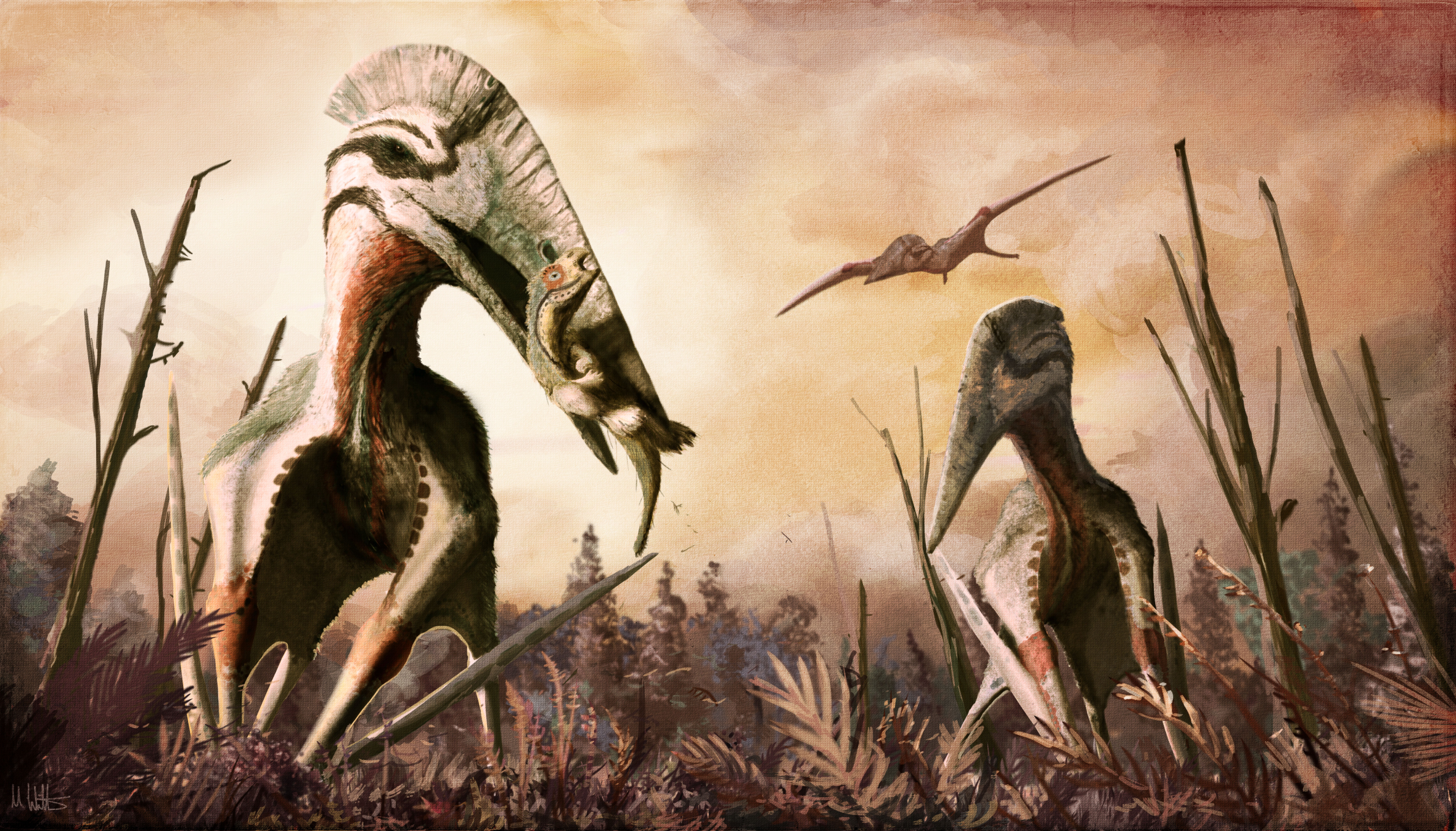

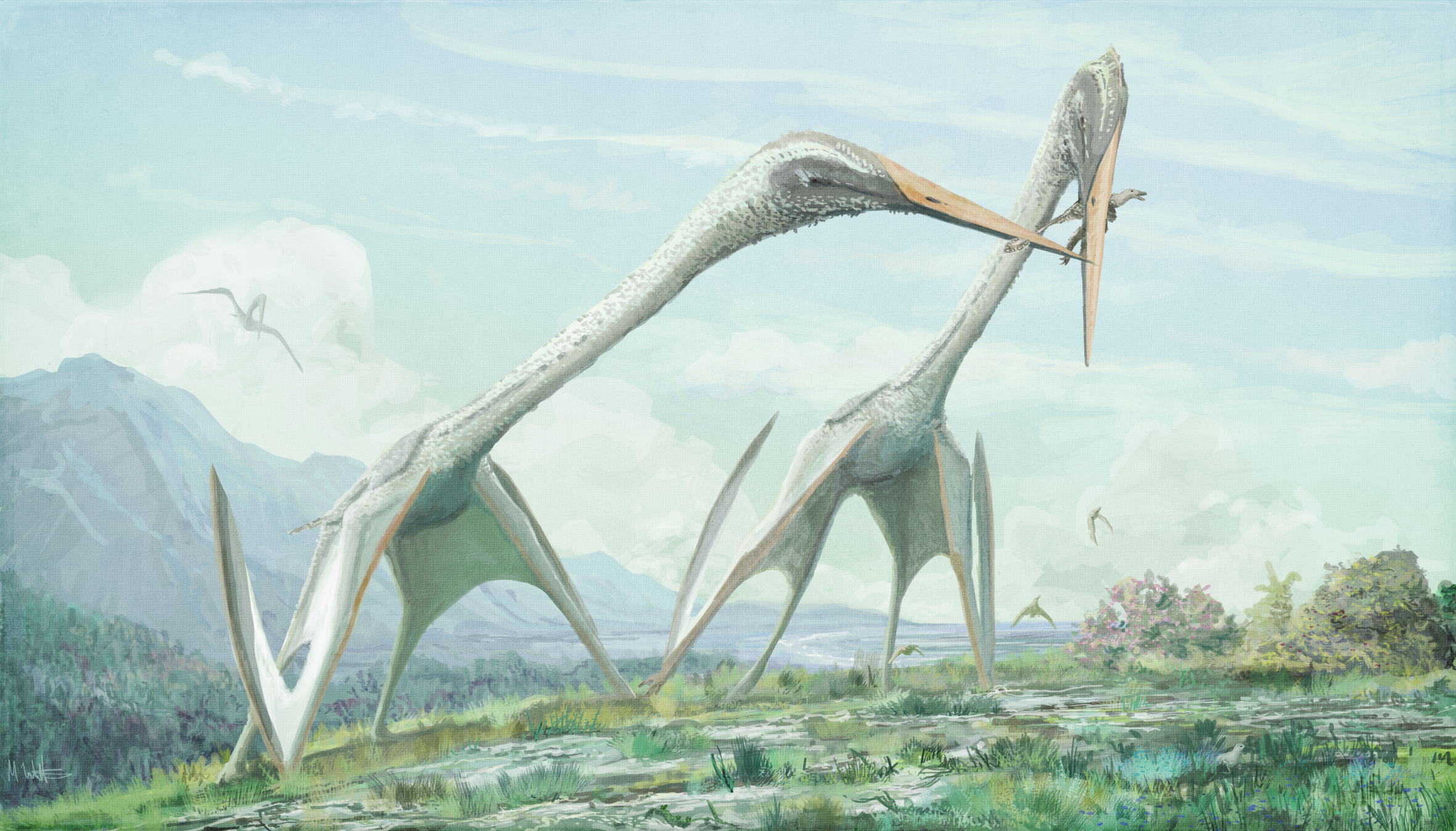
Life reconstructions of Hatzegopteryx (top) and Arambourgiania (bottom), giant members of the family Azhdarchidae

Generally speaking, in the modern scientific literature, there are two major competing hypotheses regarding the classification of azhdarchoids. The first of these is based on the work of Brian Andres and colleagues, who have published multiple papers on the taxa Kryptodrakon, Elanodactylus, and Quetzalcoatlus among others, in which they examined the phylogenetic relationships of these groups. Andres and colleagues have generally suggested that Dsungaripteridae and Thalassodromidae are closely related and that they form a clade (Dsungaripteromorpha) which is more closely related to Azhdarchidae than Tapejaridae. This result has been corroborated by some other authors. A simplified version of Andres and colleagues' phylogeny is shown below.

- Ornithocheiroidea
  - Pteranodontoidea
  - Azhdarchoidea
    - Tapejaridae
    - Neoazhdarchia
      - Dsungaripteromorpha
        - Microtuban
        - - Dsungaripteridae
          - Thalassodromidae
      - Neopterodactyloidea
        - Chaoyangopteridae
        - Azhdarchiformes
          - Radiodactylus
          - - Montanazhdarcho
            - Azhdarchidae

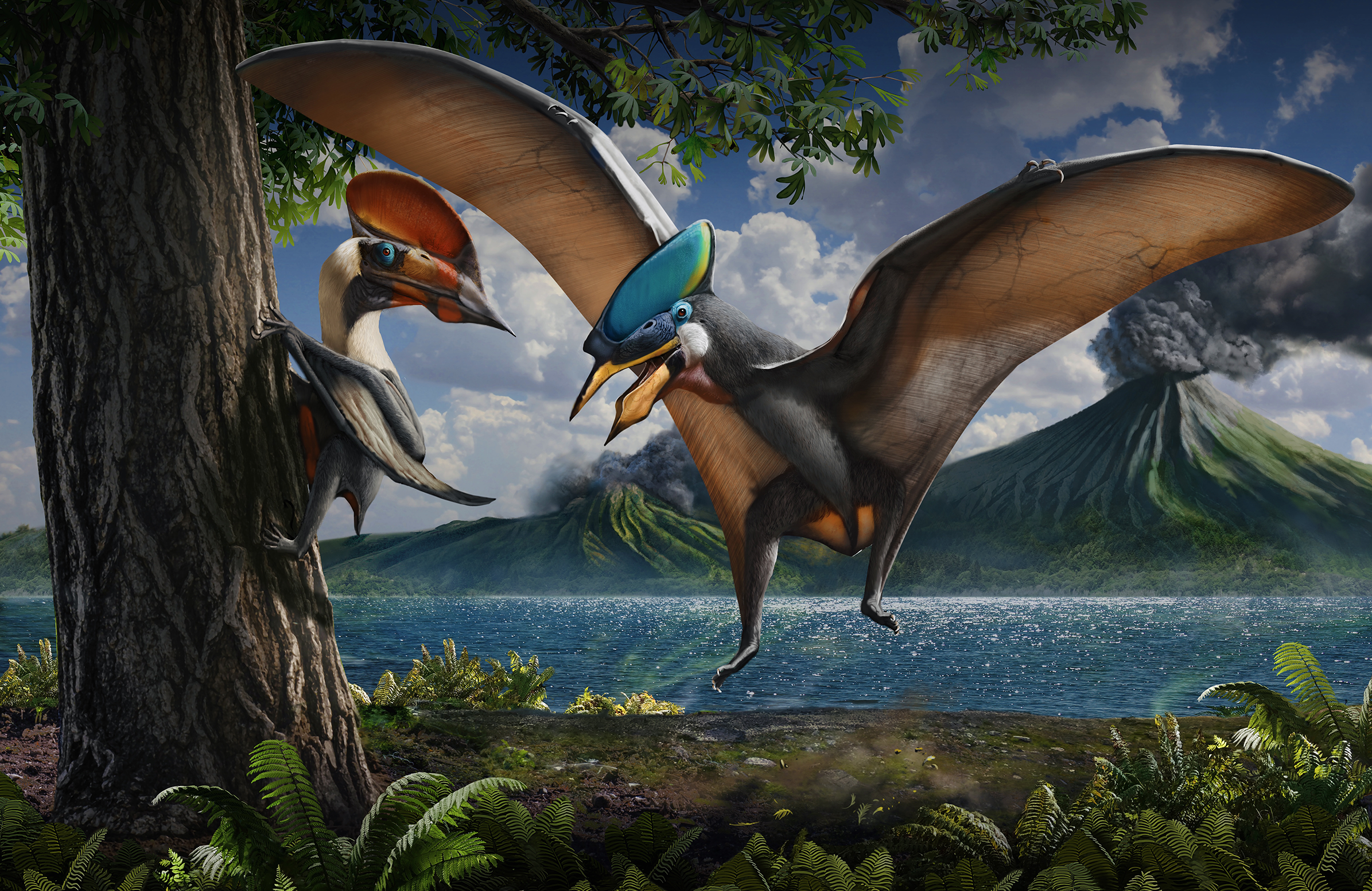
Tapejarids, one of the prominent azhdarchoid families. Sinopterus (left) and Huaxiadraco (right) are pictured

The second hypothesis of azhdarchoid relationships is that Dsungaripteridae is the sister taxon of Azhdarchoidea within the larger clade Tapejaroidea. This hypothesis has been published on by R. Pêgas and colleagues in their extensive studies of pterosaurs like Sinopterus, Thalassodromeus, and Aerotitan. This hypothesis has also received support from other authors. A simplified version of their phylogeny is shown below.

- Ornithocheiroidea
  - Pteranodontoidea
  - Tapejaroidea
    - Dsungaripteridae
    - Azhdarchoidea
      - Tapejaromorpha
        - Thalassodromidae
        - Tapejariformes
          - Caupedactylia
          - Tapejaridae
      - Azhdarchomorpha
        - Keresdrakon
        - - Chaoyangopteridae
          - Azhdarchiformes
            - Alanqidae
            - Azhdarchidae

In 2025, Henry N. Thomas and Skye N. McDavid performed an extensive revision of pterosaur phylogenetics with a focus on Azhdarchomorpha. Their results align with a previous analysis by Pêgas et al., (2024) finding Tapejaroidea to be monophyletic containing Dsungaripteromorpha and Azhdarchoidea, as well as Tapejaromorpha and Azhdarchomorpha being sister taxa within Azhdarchoidea. A simplified version of their results is shown below.

- Ornithocheiroidea
  - Pteranodontoidea
  - Tapejaroidea
    - Dsungaripteromorpha
    - Azhdarchoidea
      - Tapejaromorpha
        - Thalassodromidae
        - Tapejariformes
          - Caupedactylia
          - Eutapejaria
            - 'Palaeornis' cliftii
            - Tapejaridae
              - Sinopterinae
              - Tapejarinae
                - Europejara
                - Tapejarini
                  - Tupandactylus
                  - - Tapejara
                    - Caiuajarina
      - Azhdarchomorpha
        - Microtuban
        - Inabtanin
        - Concilazhia
          - Chaoyangopteridae
            - Shenzhoupterinae
            - - - Ornithostoma
                - Apatorhamphus
              - Chaoyangopterinae
          - Azhdarchiformes
            - Alanqidae
            - - - Radiodactylus
                - Montanazhdarcho
              - Azhdarchidae
                - Phosphatodraconia
                - - ‘Zhejiangopterus clade’
                  - Azhdarchinae
                    - Azhdarcho
                    - Quetzalcoatlinae
                      - Cryodrakon
                      - - Hatzegopterygia
                        - Quetzalcoatlini
                          - - - Nipponopterus
                              - Gobiazhdarcho
                          - Serpennata

==== Subclades ====
A wide variety of subclades have been defined within Azhdarchoidea in the last 15 years. Many of these have contradictory or overlapping definitions, and so whether or not these clades represent true monophyletic groups remains hotly debated. Some of the uncertainty regards the position of Thalassodromidae, which may be closely related to either Tapejaridae or Dsungaripteridae. Another source of uncertainty is the affinities of the dsungaripterids themselves. This problematic group has been found to be closely related to Ornithocheiromorpha, just outside of Azhdarchoidea, or within Azhdarchoidea.

Name	Named by	Definition	Notes
Azhdarchiformes	Andres, 2021	Most-inclusive clade containing Quetzalcoatlus, but not Chaoyangopterus	
Azhdarchomorpha	Pêgas et al., 2021	Most-inclusive clade containing Azhdarcho, but not Tapejara or Thalassodromeus	May be synonymous with Neopterodactyloidea if Thalassodromeus is a member of Tapejaridae
Concilazhia	Thomas & McDavid, 2025	Least-inclusive clade containing Azhdarcho, Chaoyangopterus, and Alanqa	Similar definition to 'Neopterodactyloidea' but uses Azhdarcho as an internal specifier rather than Quetzalcoatlus
Dsungaripteromorpha	Andres et al., 2014	Most-inclusive clade containing Dsungaripterus but not Quetzalcoatlus	May be synonymous with Dsungaripteridae if Dsungaripteridae is outside of Azhdarchoidea
Neoazhdarchia	Unwin, 2003	Least-inclusive clade containing both Azhdarcho and Tupuxuara	May be synonymous with Azhdarchoidea if Tupuxuara belongs to Tapejaridae; has alternately been used interchangeably with Azhdarchomorpha
Neopterodactyloidea	Andres et al., 2014	Least inclusive clade containing both Azhdarcho and Chaoyangopterus	May be used interchangeably with Azhdarchomorpha if Chaoyangopterus is its most basal member; however, under the PhyloCode, this clade is improperly named, as it is derived from Pterodactylus despite not including the genus in the clade
Tapejariformes	Pêgas et al., 2024	The clade characterized by a downturned rostrum synapomorphic with that of Tapejara	May be synonymous with Tapejaridae if Caupedactylus is a tapejarid
Tapejaroidea	Kellner, 1996	Least-inclusive clade containing Quetzalcoatlus, Tapejara, and Dsungaripterus	May be synonymous with Azhdarchoidea if Dsungaripterus is more closely related to Quetzalcoatlus than either are to Tapejara; alternatively used for a clade containing Tapejaridae and Thalassodromidae
Tapejaromorpha	Andres et al., 2014	Most inclusive clade containing Tapejara but not Azhdarcho	

== See also ==
- List of pterosaur genera
- Timeline of pterosaur research
