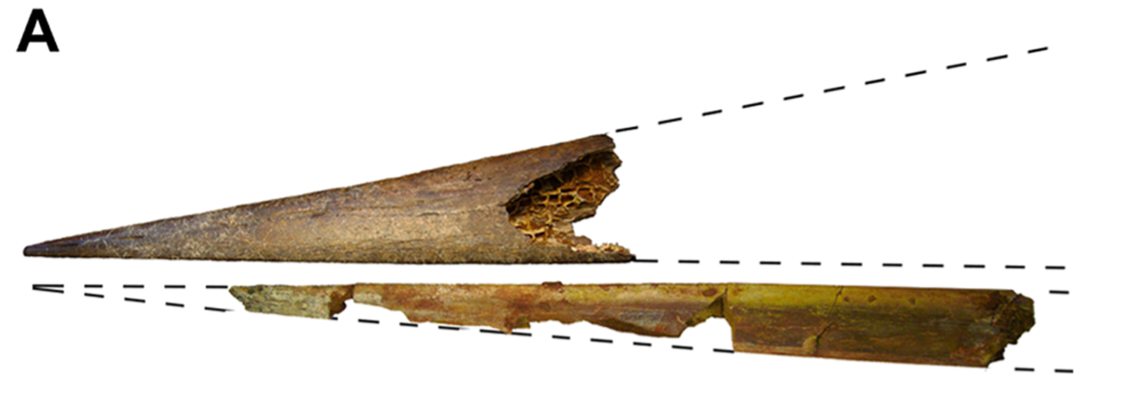
- Jaws from the holotype of A. saharica

Scientific classification
- Kingdom: Animalia
- Phylum: Chordata
- Class: Reptilia
- Order: †Pterosauria
- Suborder: †Pterodactyloidea
- Clade: †Azhdarchoidea
- Family: †Alanqidae
- Genus: †Alanqa; Ibrahim et al., 2010
- Species: †A. saharica

Binomial name
- †Alanqa saharica Ibrahim et al., 2010

= Alanqa =

Alanqa Temporal range: Cenomanian, 95 Ma

Genus of azhdarchoid pterosaur from the Late Cretaceous

Alanqa is a genus of alanqid pterosaur from the Late Cretaceous period (Cenomanian stage) of what is now the Kem Kem Group of southeastern Morocco. The name Alanqa comes from the Arabic word العنقاء al-'Anqā', for a mythical bird of Arabian culture.

== Discovery ==
With the assistance of local villagers, a team of paleontologists conducted excavations at several sites in the Kem Kem Beds in April and November to December 2008, recovering fragmentary remains of several pterosaur taxa. The type locality of Alanqa is Aferdou N'Chaft, near the village of Begaa and approximately 10 kilometers (6.2 mi) northeast of Taouz.

== Description ==
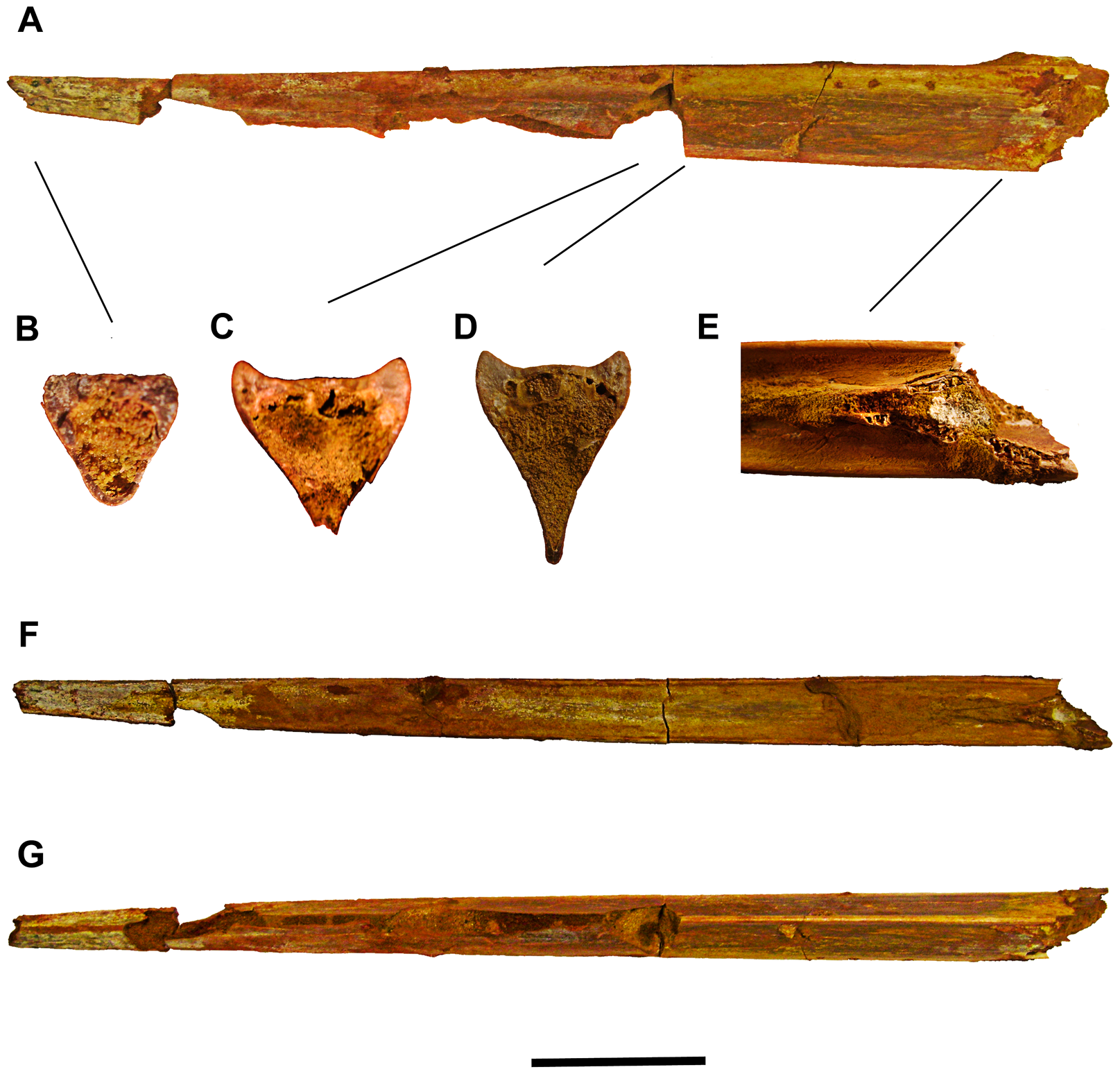
Holotype specimen (FSAC-KK 26)

Alanqa is known only from five fragments of the front upper and lower jaws, and possibly a neck vertebra, representing the single type species Alanqa saharica. Two of these fragments were first described, but not named, by Wellnhofer and Buffetaut in 1999, and referred to a pteranodontid. Three additional jaw specimens, including a better preserved upper jaw, were described and named by Ibrahim and colleagues in 2010. The jaws were straight and pointed, like those of the azhdarchids Quetzalcoatlus and Zhejiangopterus. Based on comparison to related species, the Alanqa saharica individuals known from jaw specimens probably had wingspans of about 4 meters (13 ft). However, according to Ibrahim and colleagues, the vertebra (which probably belonged to the same species) appeared to come from a larger individual, measuring about 6 meters (20 ft) in wingspan. An individual of such size would have weighed 16–37 kilograms (35–82 lb).

A rostrum fragment was described in 2015 and referred to cf. Alanqa based on provenance. This fragment has two bony protuberances where the jaw occludes, coinciding with an eminence on one of the mandibles originally referred to Alanqa. These imply an unusual functional specialization in this pterosaur; possible functions include visual display, anchoring of soft tissue, and crushing hard-shelled food.

== Classification ==
In its initial description, Alanqa was referred to the Azhdarchidae, based on the similarity of its jaws to those of Quetzalcoatlus and Zhejiangopterus. This result was reproduced by a subsequent analysis. Another analysis, this time by Nicholas Longrich and colleagues in 2018, recovered Alanqa as a thalassodromid, sister taxon to Aerotitan (a pterosaur also assigned as an azhdarchid). However, this concept is not well-supported. The cladogram of their analysis is shown below:

- Dsungaripteromorpha
  - Dsungaripteridae
  - Thalassodromidae
    - - Tupuxuara longicristatus
      - Tupuxuara leonardii
    - - Thalassodromeus sethi
      - - Alanqa saharica
        - Aerotitan sudamericanus

A 2022 study by Rubi Pêgas and colleagues showed dissimilarities between Aerotitan and Alanqa, as well as other thalassodromines. The former was recovered as an azhdarchid, while Alanqa was recovered as a basal azhdarchoid related to Keresdrakon, both forming the new clade Alanqidae.

- Tapejaroidea
  - Dsungaripteridae
  - Azhdarchoidea
    - Tapejaridae
    - Azhdarchomorpha
      - Alanqidae
        - Alanqa
        - Keresdrakon
      - - Chaoyangopteridae
        - - Radiodactylus
          - Azhdarchidae

== Paleoecology ==
Alanqa inhabited the late Cenomanian Kem Kem Group, which represented a freshwater delta system. It is believed to have been in the middle of the ecosystem's food web, preying on both small animals like crustaceans and mollusks, amphibians like Kababisha and Oumtkoutia, small to medium-sized reptiles like Simoliophis libycus, and even small or juvenile dinosaurs, much like other azhdarchids. On the other hand, Alanqa would be a prey item for the large predators of the ecosystem, such as theropod dinosaurs (Spinosaurus, Carcharodontosaurus, and Sauroniops), crocodyliforms like Aegisuchus, and possibly a currently-unidentified madtsoiid snake. Grooves in the jaw suggest Alanqa was specialised to feed on hard foodstuffs like molluscs and seeds.

== See also ==
- Timeline of pterosaur research
- List of pterosaurs
- 2010 in paleontology
