= Wade (surname) =

Surname

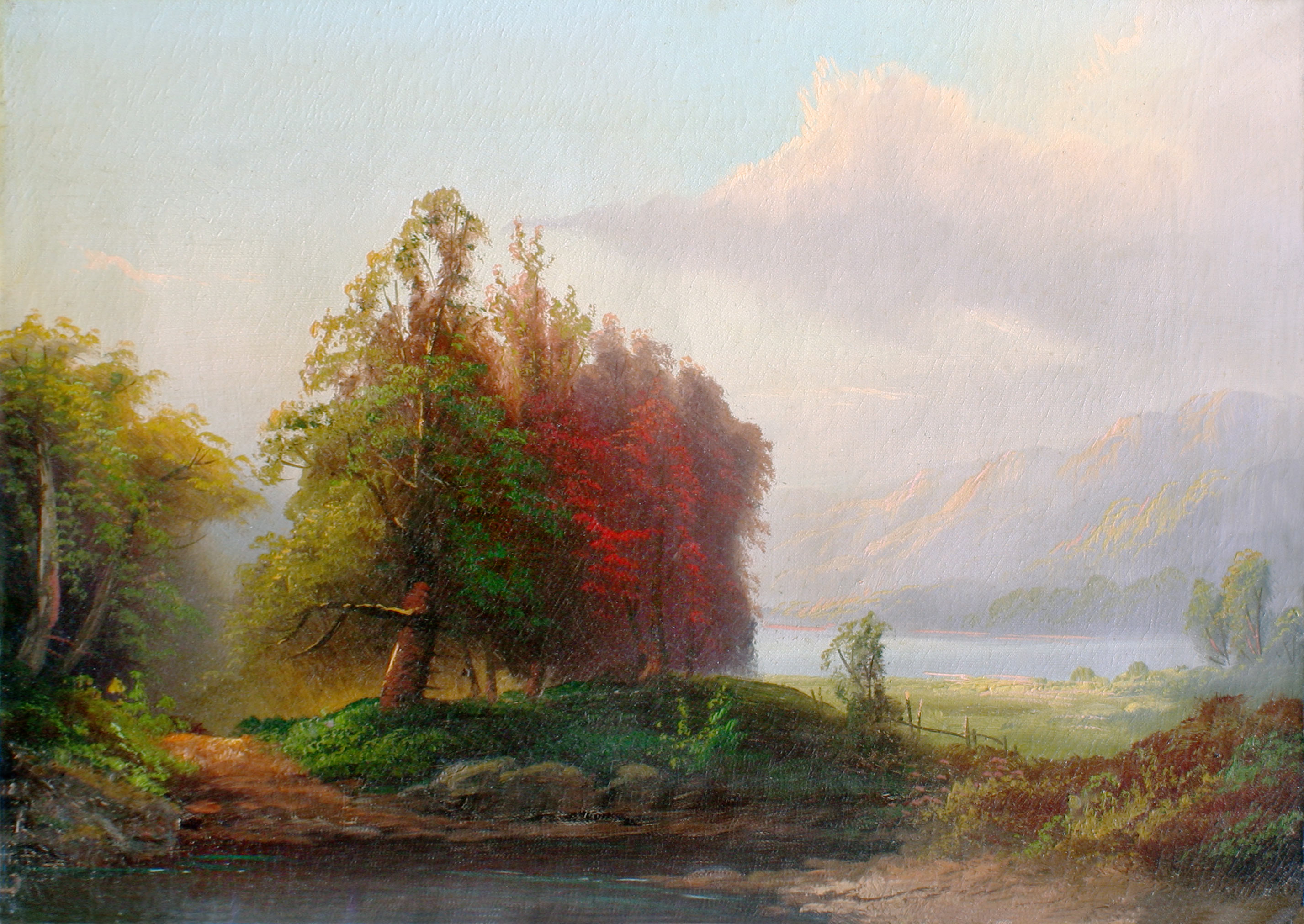
A ford in a 19th-century oil painting

Wade is a surname of Anglo-Saxon English origin. It is thought to derive from the Middle English given name "Wade", which itself derived from the Old English verb "wadan" (wada) meaning "to go", or as a habitational name from the Old English word "(ge)waed" meaning "ford".

Variants of this surname include Waide and Wadey, the latter a diminutive variant. There is also a documented relationship between Wade and Waythe, the latter derived by a variant form of "wade" meaning a ford, that being "wath"; there is likewise a relationship between Wade/Waythe and Ford/Forth.

== Notable people and fictional characters with the surname ==
=== A to E ===
- Abdoulaye Wade (born 1926), President of Senegal
- Adam Wade (drummer) (born 1968), American drummer
- Adam Wade (singer) (1935–2022), American singer, drummer and television actor
- Adam Wade (storyteller) American storyteller and actor
- April Wade, American actress and producer
- Arthur C. Wade (1852–1914), American lawyer and politician
- Arthur Edward Wade (1895–1989), British botanist, lichenologist and museum curator
- Barrington Wade (born 1998), American football player
- Ben Wade (1922–2002), American baseball player
- Bernie L. Wade (born 1963), American minister, President of the International Circle of Faith
- Bill Wade (footballer) (1901–1958), English footballer
- Bill Wade (1930–2016), American football quarterback
- Betsy Wade (1929–2020), American journalist
- Brandon Wade (born 1970), American businessman
- Bruce Wade (1889–1973), American paleontologist and geologist
- Bryan Wade (born 1963), English footballer
- Christian Wade (born 1991), English rugby player and American football player
- Claude Martin Wade (1794–1861), British political officer in India and Afghanistan
- Cory Wade (born 1983), American Major League Baseball player
- David Wade (Louisiana general) (1911–1990), U.S. Army general, namesake of David Wade Correctional Center
- David Wade (politician) (born 1950), former South Australian politician
- Dallas Toler-Wade (born 1974), American musician
- Dayton Wade (born 2000), American football player
- Dean Wade (born 1996), American basketball player
- Don Wade (1928–2007), American football coach and college athletics administrator
- Donald Wade, Baron Wade (1904–1988), British Liberal Party politician
- Doug Wade (born 1941), Australian rules footballer
- Dwyane Wade (born 1982), American basketball player
- Ed Wade (born 1956), baseball executive
- Eddie Wade (1948–2025), Irish politician
- Edward Wade (1802–1866), American politician

=== F to J ===
- Gale Wade (1929–2022), American baseball player
- George Wade (1673–1748), British military commander
- George Wade (musician) (c.1895 – 1975), Canadian folk musician and band leader
- George Wade (pottery manufacturer) (1891–1986), chairman of Wade Ceramics Ltd in Britain
- Gloria Wade-Gayles (1937–2026), American academic and author
- Henry Wade (1914–2001), Texas lawyer and lead defendant in Roe v. Wade
- Henry Wade, pen name of British mystery writer Sir Henry Aubrey-Fletcher, 6th Baronet (1887–1969)
- Henry Wade (surgeon) (1876–1955), Scottish surgeon
- Herbert Wade (doctor) (1886–1968), American doctor and researcher on leprosy
- Herby Wade (1905–1980), South African cricketer
- Hunter Wade (1916–2011), New Zealand diplomat
- Jack Wade (footballer) (1907–1941), Australian rules footballer
- Jack Wade (James Bond), a character in two James Bond films
- Jack Wade, Alaska, an unincorporated community
- James Wade (born 1983), English darts player
- James Wade (basketball) (born 1975), American-French basketball coach
- Jason Wade (born 1980), singer/songwriter
- Jennie Wade (1843–1863), the only civilian casualty in the Battle of Gettysburg
- Jeremy Wade (born 1956), British TV presenter (River Monsters) and fishing author
- Jessey Wade (c. 1861 – 1952), English suffragette and animal welfare campaigner
- Jim Wade (1925–2019), American football player
- Joe Wade (filmmaker), British filmmaker, TV writer and producer
- Joe Wade (footballer) (1921–2005), British footballer and manager
- Joe Wade (trade unionist) (1919–2004), British trade union leader
- John Wade (disambiguation), several people
- Joivan Wade (born 1993), British actor
- Julian Wade (born 1990), Dominican footballer
- Julie Marie Wade (born 1979), American writer and professor of writing

=== K to O ===
- Karim Wade (born 1968), Senegalese politician
- LaMonte Wade Jr. (born 1994), American baseball player
- Lillian Wade (1870–1923), British sculptor
- Lloyd Wade, English gospel and soul singer, vocal coach
- Logan Wade (born 1991), Australian baseball player
- Madeline Wade, American physicist
- Magatte Wade (born 1976), Senegalese businesswoman
- Mark Wade (born 1965), American retired basketball player
- Mark Wade, American space enthusiast and author who maintained Encyclopedia Astronautica
- Mark Wade (ventriloquist), American ventriloquist
- Martin Joseph Wade (1861–1931), U.S. Democratic Representative from Iowa
- Mary Wade (1775–1859), British convict transported to Australia aboard the Lady Juliana in 1790
- Mary Hazelton Blanchard Wade (1860–1936), American writer
- Mary Wade (paleontologist) (1928–2005), Australian paleontologist
- Matthew Wade (born 1987), Australian cricketer
- Melancthon S. Wade (died 1868), Union Army general
- Morgan Wade (singer) (born 1995), American singer
- Mortimer Wade (1821–1902), American manufacturer and politician
- Nan Wade, alias of a Manx wise woman (or two women) active in the 19th-century
- Ned Wade (hurler) (1911–1992), Irish hurler
- Nicholas Wade (born 1942 in England), US science writer and author
- Nicholas J. Wade, British vision researcher and historian of vision
- Oulton Wade, Baron Wade of Chorlton (1932–2018), British politician and businessman

=== P to T ===
- Paul Wade (born 1962), Australian soccer player
- Peter Wade, British anthropologist
- Rachel Wade (born 1990), American murderer
- Rebekah Wade, English journalist
- Reg Wade, English footballer
- Robert Wade (disambiguation), multiple people
- Rosalind Wade (1909–1989), British novelist
- Scott Wade (born 1960), Australian rules footballer
- Shaun Wade (disambiguation), multiple people
- Sidney Wade (born 1951), American poet
- Silas A. Wade (1797–1869), American politician
- Stephen Wade (politician) (born 1960), Australian politician
- Ted Wade (disambiguation), multiple people
- Terence Wade (1930–2005), English academic and linguist
- Thomas Wade (disambiguation), multiple people
- Tobías Wade (born 1999), Argentine rugby union player
- Tomás Wade (died 1982), Argentine field hockey player
- Tyler Wade (born 1994), American baseball player

=== U to Z ===
- Virginia Wade (born 1945), tennis player from the United Kingdom
- Wallace Wade (1892–1986), American college sports coach
- Wayne Wade (born 1959), Jamaican reggae musician
- William Wade (Maldon MP), in 1410, MP for Maldon
- William Wade (English politician) (1546–1623), English statesman and diplomat
- Sir William Wade (lord mayor) (1849–1935), British politician, Lord Mayor of Bradford
- William Wade, Baron Wade of Chorlton (1932–2018), British politician, businessman and agriculturalist
- William Wade (Canon of Windsor) (1672–1733), Irish Anglican priest
- William Wade (Dean of Glasgow and Galloway) (died 1845), Scottish Episcopalian priest
- Sir William Wade (legal scholar) (1918–2004), British academic lawyer
- William Wade (journalist) (1918–2006), American war correspondent during World War II
- Willoughby Francis Wade (1827–1906), British physician

== See also ==
- Justice Wade (disambiguation)
