= Camille Arambourg =

French paleontologist (1885–1969)

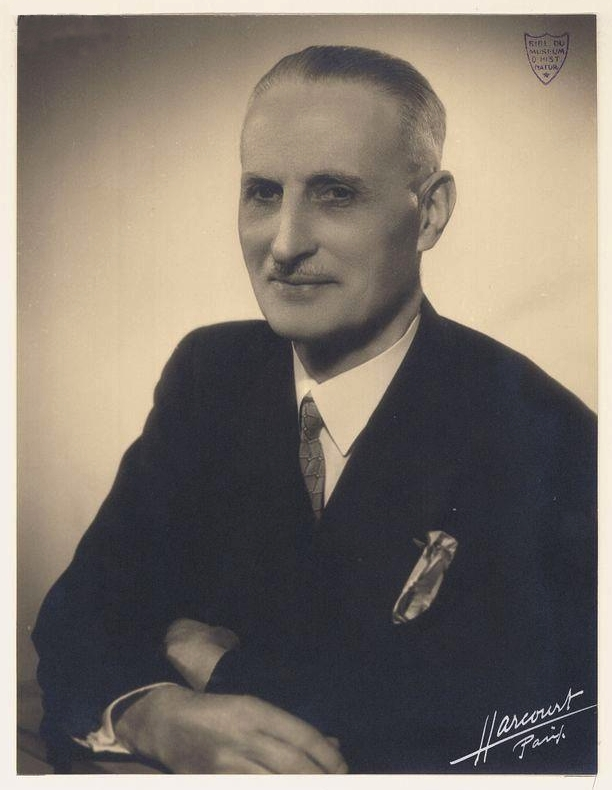
- Arambourg c. 1940
- Born: 3 February 1885
- Died: 19 November 1969 (aged 84)
- Education: Student of Marcellin Boule
- Known for: Field work in North Africa
- Scientific career
- Fields: Palaeontology
- Workplaces: Institut Agricole d'Alger, Muséum National d'Histoire Naturelle

Camille Arambourg (February 3, 1885 – November 19, 1969) was a French vertebrate paleontologist. He conducted extensive field work in North Africa. In the 1950s, he argued against the prevailing model of Neanderthals as brutish and simian.

During World War I, he was in Military service. After that, he was a professor of Geology at the Institut Agricole d'Alger, and after that a professor of Paleontology at Muséum National d'Histoire Naturelle in Paris, where he succeeded his teacher, Marcellin Boule. The pterosaur Arambourgiania is named after him. He was President of the PanAfrican Archaeological Association from 1959 to 1963.

== Publications ==
- (1942) "L’ Elephas recki Dietrich. Exposition systématique et ses affinités". Bull. Soc. géol. France sér. 5, 12: 73-87.
- (1947) Mission scientifique de l’Omo (1932-1933). Géologie et Anthropologie. Mus. Natl.
- (1948) "Observations sur le Quaternaire de la région du Hoggar", Travaux de l'Institut de Recherches Sahariennes, t. V, pp. 7–18.
- (1955) "L'ancien lac de Tihodaïne et ses gisements préhistoriques - I. Historique et stratigraphie", Actes du IIème Congrès Panafricain de Préhistoire d'Alger (1952), pp. 281–292.
- (1957) "Récentes découvertes de paléontologie humaine réalisées en Afrique du Nord française (L'Atlanthropus de Ternifine - L'Hominien de Casablanca)", Third Panafrican Congress on Prehistory, Livingstone 1955, Clark, J.D. & Cole, S., Eds., London, Chatto & Windus, pp. 186–194.
- (1958) "Les artisans des industries acheuléennes", Bulletin de la Société Préhistorique de l'Ariège (Préhistoire Spéléologie Ariégeoises), t. XIII, pp. 43–47.
- (1962) "État actuel des recherches sur le Quaternaire de l'Afrique du Nord", Actes du IVème Congrès Panafricain de Préhistoire et de l'Etude du Quaternaire, Musée royal de l'Afrique centrale - Tervuren (Belgique) - Annales, série in 8° - Sciences humaines, n° 40, pp. 255–277.
- (with P. Biberson) (1956) "The fossil human remains from the Paleolithic site of Sidi Abderrahman (Morocco)", American Journal of Physical Anthropology, v. 14 n.s., n° 3, pp. 467–490.

== Tribute ==
The fish Enteromius arambourgi is named in his honor.
