= David Wade =

David Wade may refer to:

- David Wade (Louisiana general) (1911–1990), U.S. Army general, namesake of David Wade Correctional Center
- David Wade (politician) (born 1950), former South Australian politician

== See also ==
- David Wade Ross (born 1977), American baseball catcher
- Wade (surname)
