= Sid Ahmed Ferroukhi =

Algerian politician (1967–2022)

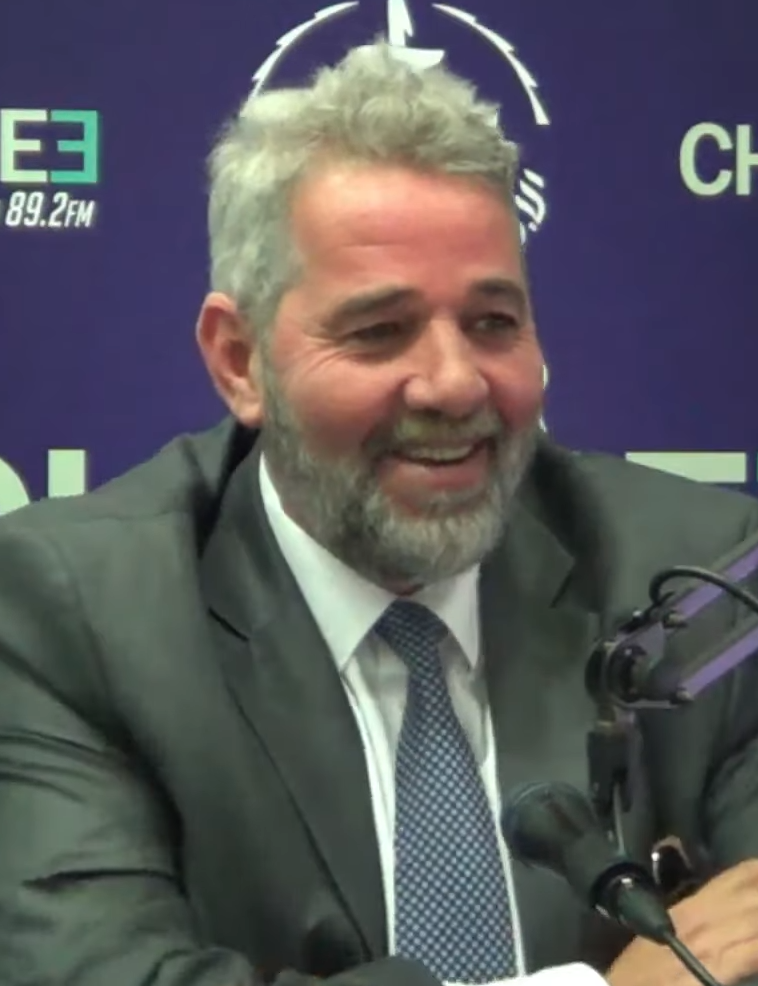
- Ferroukhi in 2021

Minister of Post and Information and Communication Technologies (acting)
- In office 27 April 2021 – 8 July 2021
- Preceded by: Brahim Boumzar
- Succeeded by: Karim Bibi Triki

Minister of Fisheries and Fish Production
- In office 4 January 2020 – 8 July 2021
- Preceded by: Cherif Omari
- Succeeded by: Hicham Sofiane Salawatchi

Member of the People's National Assembly
- In office 18 May 2017 – 4 March 2019
- Constituency: Algiers Province

Personal details
- Born: 11 July 1967 Bologhine, Algeria
- Died: 17 June 2022 (aged 54) Rouïba, Algeria
- Party: FLN
- Education: Higher National Agronomic School

Sid Ahmed Ferroukhi (Arabic: سيد أحمد فروخي; 11 July 1967 – 17 June 2022) was an Algerian politician.

== Biography ==
Sid Ahmed was the son of doctor Hamdane Ferroukhi and the nephew of resistance fighter Mustapha Ferroukhi. He obtained the title of state engineer in agronomy from the Higher National Agronomic School, of which he became Deputy Director in 1997. In 2005, he was appointed Secretary-General of the Algerian Space Agency.

Ferroukhi served as Minister of Fisheries and Fishery Resources from 2012 to 2016 and Minister of Agriculture and Rural Development from 2015 to 2016. In 2017, he was elected to the People's National Assembly as a member of the National Liberation Front, where he supported the fifth term of President Abdelaziz Bouteflika. He resigned from his mandate on 4 March 2019 amidst the Hirak Movement.

From 2020 to 2021, Ferroukhi was interim Minister of Fisheries and Fish Production.

Sid Ahmed Ferroukhi died of cardiac arrest in Rouïba on 17 June 2022 at the age of 54.
