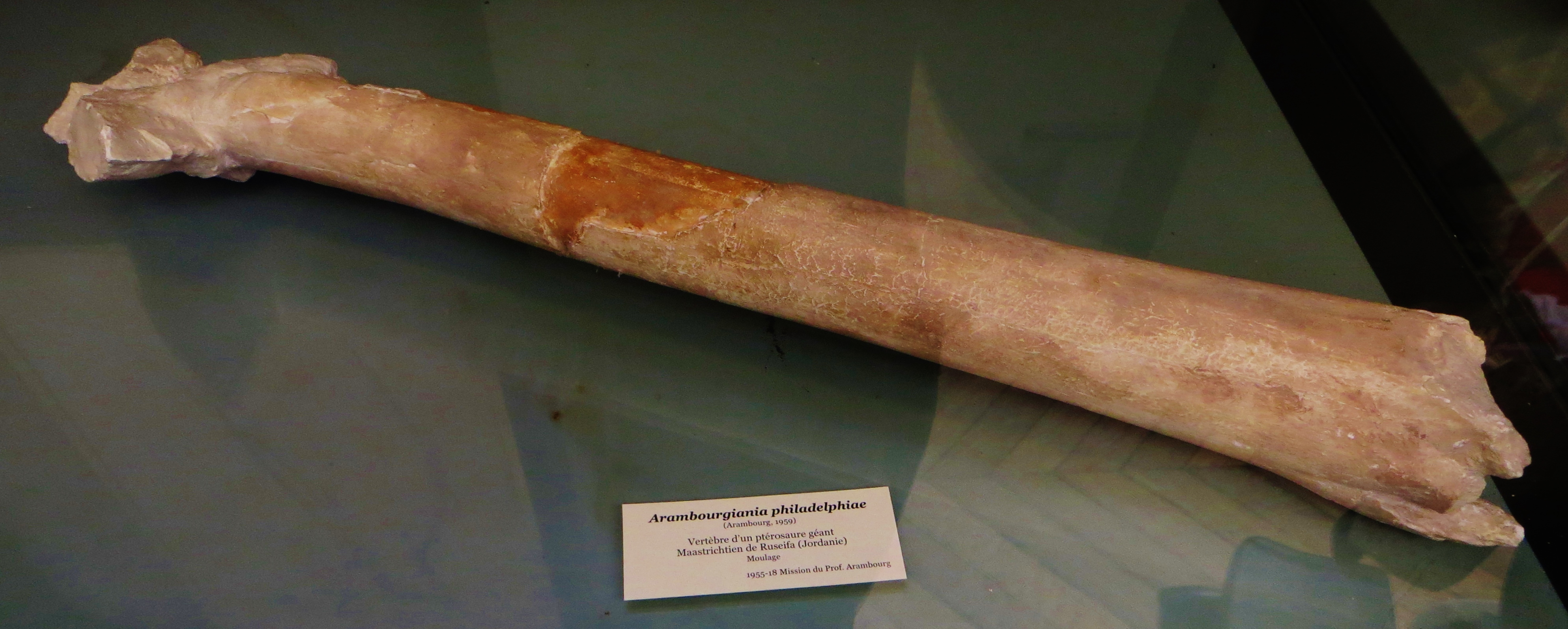
- Holotype fossil cast at Museum Histoire Naturelle, Paris

Scientific classification
- Kingdom: Animalia
- Phylum: Chordata
- Class: Reptilia
- Order: †Pterosauria
- Suborder: †Pterodactyloidea
- Clade: †Azhdarchoidea
- Family: †Azhdarchidae
- Clade: †Quetzalcoatlini
- Genus: †Arambourgiania; Nessov vide Nessov & Yarkov, 1989
- Species: †A. philadelphiae

Binomial name
- †Arambourgiania philadelphiae (Arambourg, 1959)

Synonyms
- Genus synonymy: Titanopteryx Arambourg, 1959 (preoccupied); Species synonymy: Titanopteryx philadelphiae Arambourg, 1959

= Arambourgiania =

Arambourgiania Temporal range: 72–66 Ma Late Cretaceous, Maastrichtian

Genus of large azhdarchid pterosaur from the Late Cretaceous

Arambourgiania (meaning "Camille Arambourg's") is a genus of pterosaur, an extinct group of flying reptiles, that inhabited Jordan during the Maastrichtian age of the Cretaceous period, around 72 to 66 million years ago. Additional fossil remains from the United States and Morocco have also been found, but their assignment to Arambourgiania is only tentative. The holotype (name-bearing) specimen was discovered in 1943 by a railway worker near Russeifa, Jordan. After examination of the specimen by paleontologist Camille Arambourg, he described it as belonging to a new genus and species in 1959, Titanopteryx philadelphiae. The generic name means "titan wing", as the fossil was initially misidentified as a wing metacarpal (it would be later identified as a cervical (neck) vertebra), while the specific name refers to the ancient name of Amman (the capital of Jordan), Philadelphia. The genus name "Titanopteryx" would later be problematic, as it had already been taken by a fly. Because of this, paleontologist Lev Nessov in 1989 renamed the genus to Arambourgiania, in honor of Arambourg. Since 1943, additional isolated remains including vertebrae, wing bones, and hindlimb bones have been assigned to the genus.

Due to the fragmentary nature of the Arambourgiania fossils, there is little direct information about its anatomy. Its cervical vertebrae are extremely elongated, with the holotype vertebra measuring 77–78 cm (2 ft 6.31 in – 2 ft 6.71 in) in length. Based on the complete neck of its relative Quetzalcoatlus, Arambourgiania had a total neck length of 3 m (9 ft 10 in), longer than those of giraffes. Its vertebrae were also more lightly built and weakly muscled than those of its robust, short-necked relative Hatzegopteryx. Arambourgiania is one of the largest flying animals ever discovered. Initial wingspan estimates ranged from 11 to 13 m (36 to 43 ft), which would have made it the largest known pterosaur. However, given the fragmentary remains, more recent research has suggested wingspans anywhere between 8 to 10 m (26 to 33 ft), which would still place the genus among the largest known flying animals.

Arambourgiania is a member of the family Azhdarchidae, which includes some of the largest known pterosaurs. Azhdarchids are thought to have had a terrestrial stalker lifestyle, similar to that of extant storks, though some studies have pointed out that azhdarchids are frequently found in marine deposits. This includes Arambourgiania, whose fossils are exclusively known from oceanic or coastal localities, indicating that azhdarchids may have consumed aquatic prey as well. The bones of Arambourgiania are extremely hollow and lightly built with adaptations for soaring. One of the closest relatives of Arambourgiania is Quetzalcoatlus, as multiple studies have found both pterosaurs to be grouped together within Quetzalcoatlinae. In Jordan, Arambourgiania fossils are known from the Ruseifa Formation which had deep marine environment that was deposited during the Maastrichtian. At this time, Jordan was submerged under the Tethys Sea and had a diverse composition of marine life, including mosasaurids, elasmosaurids, bony fish, and selachians. Arambourgiania is one of two pterosaurs known from Jordan, the other being Inabtanin.

== History of research ==
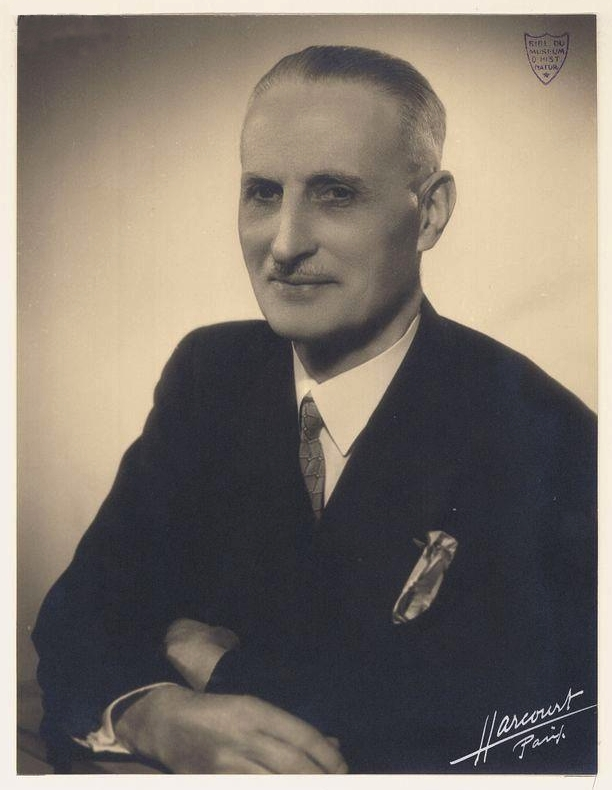
Arambourgiania was named after paleontologist Camille Arambourg, who first studied the specimen.

In 1943, during phosphate mining operations near the town of Ruseifa, Jordan, a railway worker found several fossil fragments associated with an incomplete fossilized cervical (neck) vertebra measuring 60.96 cm (2 ft) in length. Later in the same year, these fossils were acquired by Amin Kawar, the director of a nearby phosphate mine. Kawar brought the fossils to the attention of Dr. Gerald Lankester Harding, the Director of Antiquities at the British Residence in Amman (at the time Jordan was a British protectorate) who then examined the remains. The vertebra generated some publicity — it was even shown to Abdullah I of Jordan. Subsequently, the fossils were transferred to the Hebrew University of Jerusalem where reports of their origin, anatomy, and location were filed, with copies then sent to the Jordan Phosphates Mines Company. Unfortunately, these reports have since been destroyed, though there may be existing records at the Hebrew University. The phosphates in which the fossil was found belong to the Ruseifa Formation, which dates to the Maastrichtian age (72–66 million years ago) of the Late Cretaceous period.

In 1953, the vertebra was sent to the National Museum of Natural History in Paris, France, where it was examined by French paleontologist Camille Arambourg. In 1954, Arambourg interpreted the vertebra as the wing metacarpal of a giant pterosaur, and in 1959 named the new genus and species Titanopteryx philadelphiae. The generic name Titanopteryx comes from the ancient Greek roots titan, in reference to the giant Greek Titans, and pteryx meaning "wing", while the specific name refers to the ancient name of Amman that was used by the Greeks: Philadelphia. The new species was based on the misidentified wing metacarpal, making this fossil the holotype specimen; several more elements had been found at the time but were undescribed and unidentified. Arambourg had a plaster cast made and then sent the fossil back to the offices of the Jordan Phosphates Mines Company; this latter aspect was later forgotten, and the bone was assumed lost.

Even though Arambourg recognized that his pterosaur was a giant, the pteranodontid Pteranodon remained widely recognized as the largest pterosaur known to science until the description of Quetzalcoatlus. In 1975 while studying Quetzalcoatlus, American paleontologist Douglas A. Lawson correctly concluded that the holotype was not a metacarpal but a cervical vertebra. In the 1980s, an entomologist informed Russian paleontologist Lev Nessov that the name Titanopteryx had already been given to a fly from the Simuliidae family in 1935. Therefore, in 1989, he created the new genus name Arambourgiania, honoring Arambourg, with -iania being a suffix indicating possession. However, the name "Titanopteryx" was informally kept in use in the West despite being a preoccupied name.

In 1995, paleontologists David Martill and Eberhard Frey traveled to Jordan in an attempt to find the vertebra and to clarify the identity of Arambourgiania. In a cupboard of the office of the Jordan Phosphate Mines Company, Martill and Frey discovered some other pterosaur bones: a smaller vertebra and the proximal and distal extremities of a wing phalanx — but not the original material of Arambourgiania. However in 1996, after the departure of Martill and Frey to Europe, Rashdie Sadaqah, the engineer of the mine, found out that the holotype had been purchased by the geologist Hani N. Khoury in 1969, who then donated it to the University of Jordan in 1973. The fossil was still present in the collection of this institute, and therefore could be restudied by Martill and Frey. In their redescription, the two authors affirmed that Arambourgiania was a distinct taxon.

=== Additional specimens ===
==== Afro-Arabia ====
Fossil localities of Arambourgiania. Legend:
A. philadelphiae; A. sp.; Formerly referred specimens

In 2018, a set of fragmentary azhdarchid specimens housed in the Bavarian State Collection for Palaeontology and Geology of Munich, Germany were described by paleontologists David Martill and Markus Moser. These fossils were obtained by Jean Otto Haas in 1955 and came from the same location where the holotype of Arambourgiania was found; though it is uncertain whether Haas found the specimens by himself or purchased them, they were later catalogued in his personal collection before ending up in the Bavarian State Collection in 1966. The azhdarchid fossils in the collection include six fragmentary specimens referred to as cf. A. philadelphiae (meaning that it compares well to A. philadelphiae but is not necessarily assignable to that species). These specimens consist of an incomplete metacarpal IV (SNSB-BSPG 1966 XXV 501), a potential cervical vertebra fragment (SNSB-BSPG 1966 XXV 503), a left femur (thighbone) fragment (SNSB-BSPG 1966 XXV 506), a possible radius (forearm bone) fragment (SNSB-BSPG 1966 XXV 507), another cervical vertebra fragment (SNSB-BSPG 1966 XXV 508), and a potential neural arch (SNSB-BSPG 1966 XXV 512). It is possible that these specimens come from the same individual as the holotype based on their same origin and comparable size, but the authors cannot verify this due to the lack of overlapping material and detailed data on their origin.

In 1992, Lewy and colleagues described a pair of endocasts (a natural cast of the brain cavity) which had been unearthed from upper Campanian or early Maastrichtian-aged phosphates belonging to the Mishash Formation located near Mitzpe Ramon, Israel. Lewy referred these endocasts to Titanopteryx (=Arambourgiania) sp. (sp. meaning an indeterminate species) on the basis of their similarity to the endocasts of pterosaurs. However, these endocasts have no overlap with any described fossils of Arambourgiania and, according to a 2014 study, most likely belong to birds instead on the basis of their length of around 3 centimetres (1.2 in) and bird-like structure.

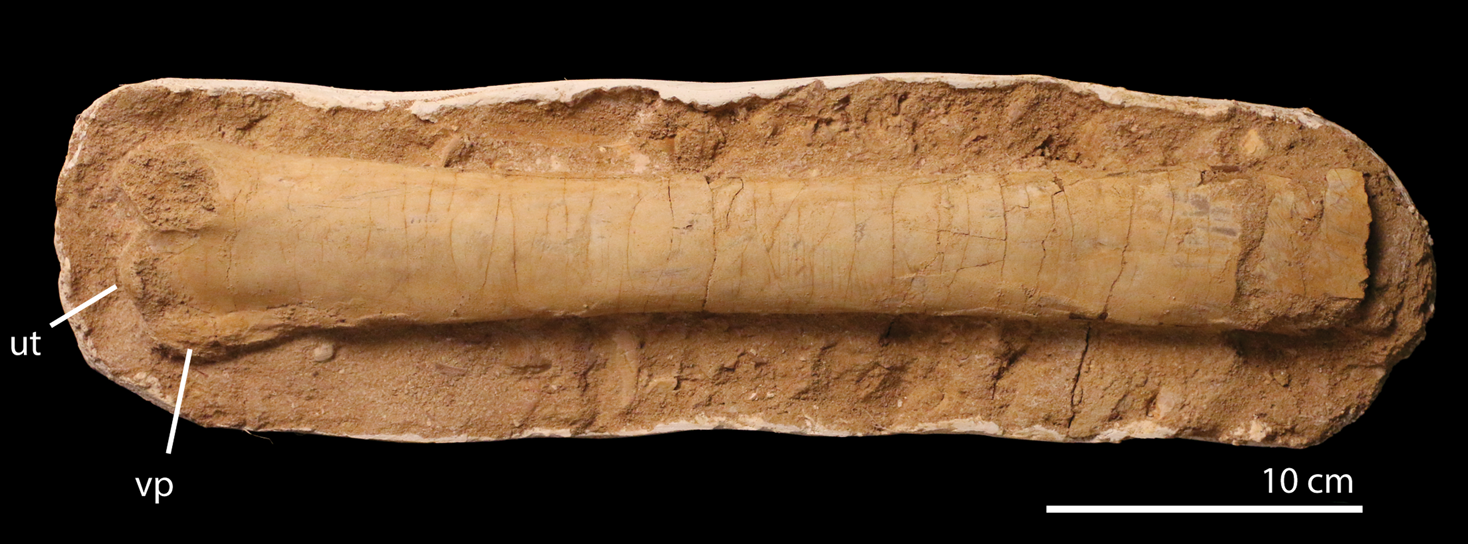
Ulna bone from the Ouled Abdoun Basin of Morocco that may belong to Arambourgiania

In 2018, paleontologists Nicholas Longrich, David Martill, and Brian Andres described an incomplete left ulna of the "Sidi Chennane azhdarchid" from the Ouled Abdoun Basin of Morocco which they tentatively identified as ?Arambourgiania. This ulna came from the Sidi Chennane mine located in the basin, a group of phosphatic sandstones dating to the Maastrichtian, which contains a host of other pterosaur genera from several different families.

In 2024, the describers of the genus Inabtanin reported a partial right humerus of a large pterosaur in the Ruseifa Phosphate Mines, near the Jordanian capital of Amman, which was where the holotype of Arambourgiania was recovered. They concluded that the specimen belonged to A. philadelphiae and that it is comparable in size and shape to the humerus of the type species of Quetzalcoatlus, Q. northropi.

==== North America ====
On 15 August 1982, Ralph Johnson unearthed an azhdarchid cervical vertebra (YPM VPPU 023497) from rock layers of the Maastrichtian-aged Navesink Formation located in Monmouth County, New Jersey in the United States. In 1983, this vertebra was referred to Titanopteryx (=Arambourgiania) sp. on the basis of its elongation and lateral compression, though it is extremely poorly preserved. The assignment of this specimen came into question in the 2025 description of Infernodrakon, where the authors considered the specimen as aff. Arambourgiania sp. (meaning that it has affinity to an undetermined species of Arambourgiania) due to its broader cross section than the known specimens of Arambourgiania and the lack of further study of the fossil. Between 1971-73, two amateur fossil collectors John Brzostoski and Harold Mendryk discovered a cervical vertebra (YPM-PU 21820), a humerus (YPM-PU 22359), and an associated femur and tibia (YPM-PU 21821) in the Early Campanian-aged Merchantville Formation of New Castle County, Delaware in the United States. Initially described as pterosaur specimens that are similar to Pteranodon, Gallagher tentatively identified them as cf. ?Titanopteryx in 1993, while Averianov identified them as indeterminate azhdarchids in 2014. In 2021, Averianov and colleagues suggested that the cervical vertebra (YPM-PU 21820) belongs to a pteranodontid or even Pteranodon itself based on its pneumaticity, a referral also suggested previously by Bennett (1994) and Barrett and colleagues (2008).

In 1999, a fragmentary azhdarchid cervical vertebra (MPPM 2000.23.1) was discovered by Memphis local Wendy Melton-Beeson and collected by paleontologist T. Lynn Harrell Jr. that same year. The cervical vertebra had been taken from rocks in Selmer, Tennessee belonging to the lower Coon Creek Formation, dating to late Campanian in age, older than the Maastrichtian-aged remains found in Jordan. In 2016, Harrell, Gibson and Langston referred the cervical to A. philadelphiae on the basis of its size, morphology, and differences from the cervical vertebrae of Quetzalcoatlus. This specimen may potentially extend the geographic range of Arambourgiania to North America, although its identity has since been contested. In 2021, Andres and Langston referred to it as cf. A. philadelphiae, whereas in 2022, American paleontologist Gregory S. Paul stated that it may not belong to Arambourgiania. In 2025, the describers of Infernodrakon considered this specimen as Arambourgiania sp. but not A. philadelphiae due to the morphological differences and temporal separation from the holotype. This same study also noted morphological similarities between MPPM 2000.23.1 and YPM VPPU 023497 from the Navesink Formation.

== Description ==
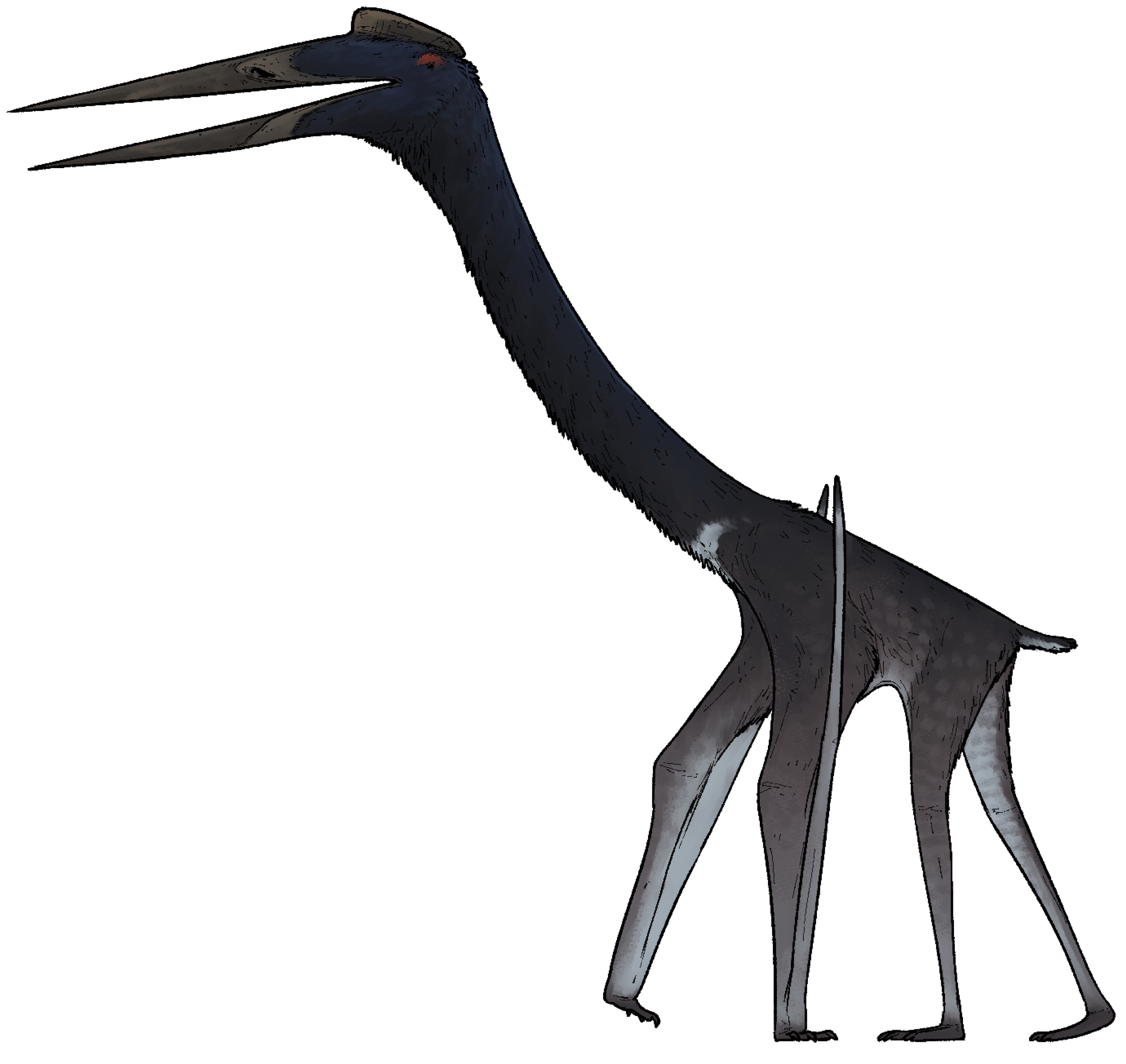
Speculative life reconstruction

Arambourgiania was among the largest azhdarchids, rivalled in size by Quetzalcoatlus and Hatzegopteryx (and possibly Cryodrakon). Azhdarchids were split into two primary categories: short-necked taxa with short, robust beaks (i.e. Hatzegopteryx and Wellnhopterus), and long-necked taxa with longer, slenderer beaks (i.e. Zhejiangopterus). Of these, Arambourgiania is of uncertain affiliation. Arambourgiania was likely quadrupedal, as indicated by the limb morphology of related species and azhdarchid trackways from South Korea. As a pterosaur, Arambourgiania would have been covered in hair-like pycnofibres and had extensive wing-membranes, which would have been distended by a long wing-finger. Various hypotheses have been proposed regarding the shape of pterodactyloid wings, though multiple well-preserved specimens suggest that azhdarchids had broad wings, with a brachiopatagium (the main flight surface) extending down to the ankle. The aspect ratio of azhdarchid wings was 8.1, similar to that of storks and birds of prey that engage in static soaring (relying on air currents to gain altitude and remain aloft).

=== Anatomy ===
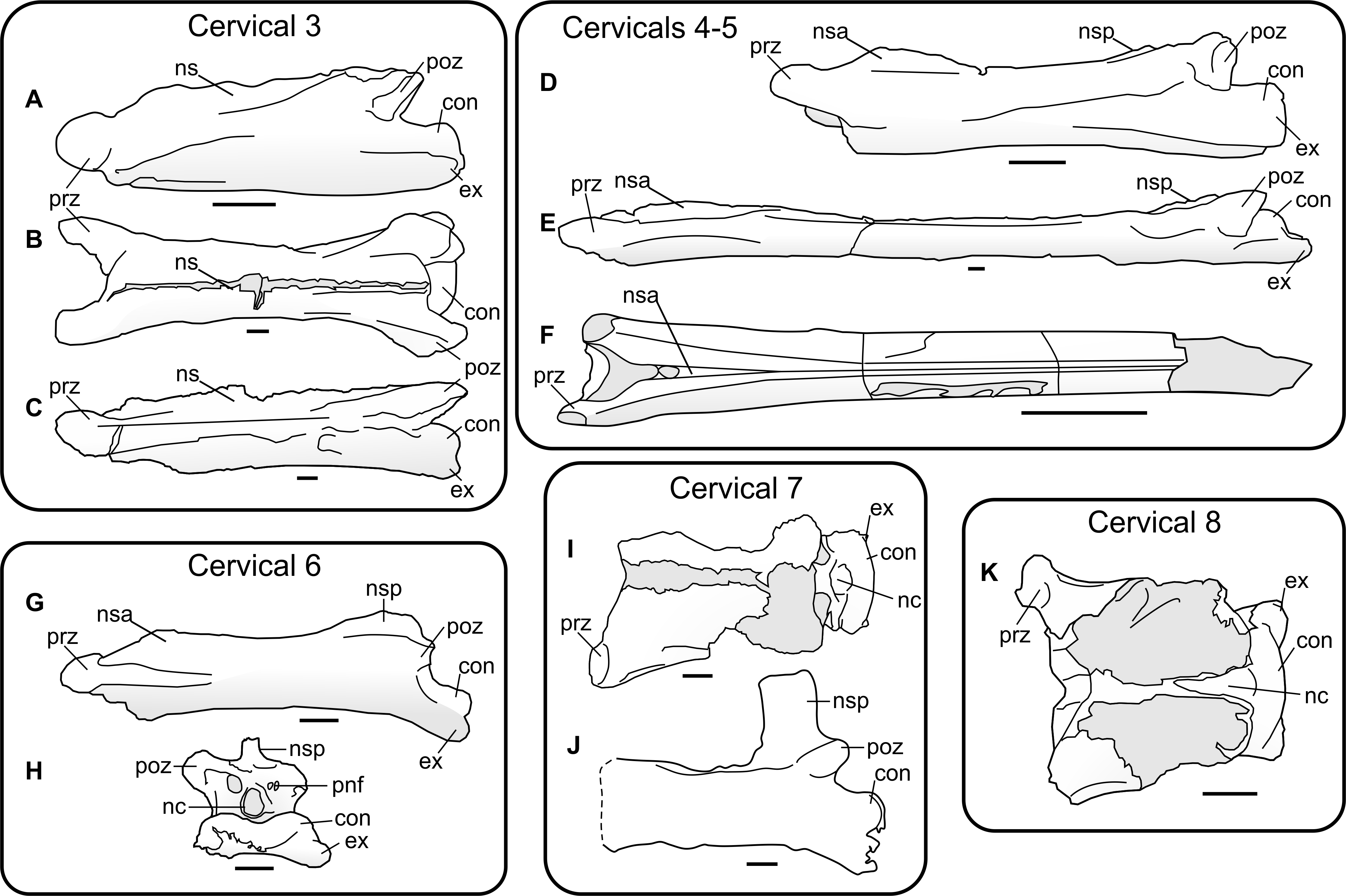
Neck vertebra of Arambourgiania (F) alongside those of other azhdarchids

Arambourgiania is known from fragmentary remains, including an incomplete holotype cervical vertebrae, other partial cervical vertebrae, a partial radius and humerus, two phalanges (bones that make up the toes), and a partial femur. The holotype of Arambourgiania, UJA VF1, consists of a very elongated cervical vertebra, probably the fifth one in the cervical series. The original material combined with its plaster was about 62 cm (2 ft 0.41 in) long, but had been sawed into three parts, and the middle section is now missing. Most of the fossil now consists of an internal infilling or mold; the thin bone walls are missing on most of the surface.

The posterior (back) portion of the vertebra is 44 mm (1.73 in) long and 55 mm (2.17 in) high and has a near circle-shaped cross section. In the anterior (front) portion, the carina sagitalis ventralis is blunt and merges into the spinous process, giving the anterior portion a low and slim profile. Arambourgiania preserves a circular, internal tube inside the cervical vertebrae, a feature observed in other azhdarchids and in dsungaripterids. The pneumatophores of the holotype cervical vertebra are significantly larger than the neural canal, a trait corresponding with maturity, though to an extent unseen in other azhdarchids. Arambourgiania lacks a dorsally (top) positioned pneumatic foramen above its neural canal, a trait typically present in relatives like Cryodrakon, distinguishing it from other azhdarchids. Fragments of other cervical vertebrae have been unearthed in Jordan as well as in the United States, though none is as complete as the holotype. A fragment of a neural arch from either an anterior dorsal (back) vertebra or a posterior cervical vertebra, but it is too incomplete and worn to surmise much information.

Several limb bones have been assigned to the genus. The proximal portion of a left metacarpal IV measures 128 mm (5.04 in) in length, is D-shaped in cross section, and has a thin covering of cortical bone. The distal portion (part away from body) of an abraded left femur was also unearthed, with a total preserved length of 142 mm (5.59 in). Its shaft has an ovular cross section from shaft to distal end. The bone is gently curved, as is typical of femora. A probable distal radius fragment is 108 mm (4.25 in) but extremely worn. Its posterior end is more expanded than the anterior end, a trait typical of pterosaur wings. An incomplete ulna unearthed in Morocco was referred to Arambourgiania and has a preserved length of 362 mm (1 ft 2.25 in) and an estimated complete length of 600–700 mm (1 ft 11.62 in – 2 ft 3.56 in). It is laterally compressed with a broad tubercule on its distal end and a low flange, similar to the condition seen in Azhdarcho. The incomplete right humerus shaft assigned to Arambourgiania measures 185 mm (7.28 in) in preserved length and 80 mm (3.15 in) in minimum height, and is therefore smaller than that of Quetzalcoatlus. It bears both an ovular and D-shaped cross section at different points as well as thin, 2 mm (0.08 in) thick layer of cortical bone. This indicates a humerus composed of 90% air by volume, making it extremely well-adapted for flight.

=== Size ===
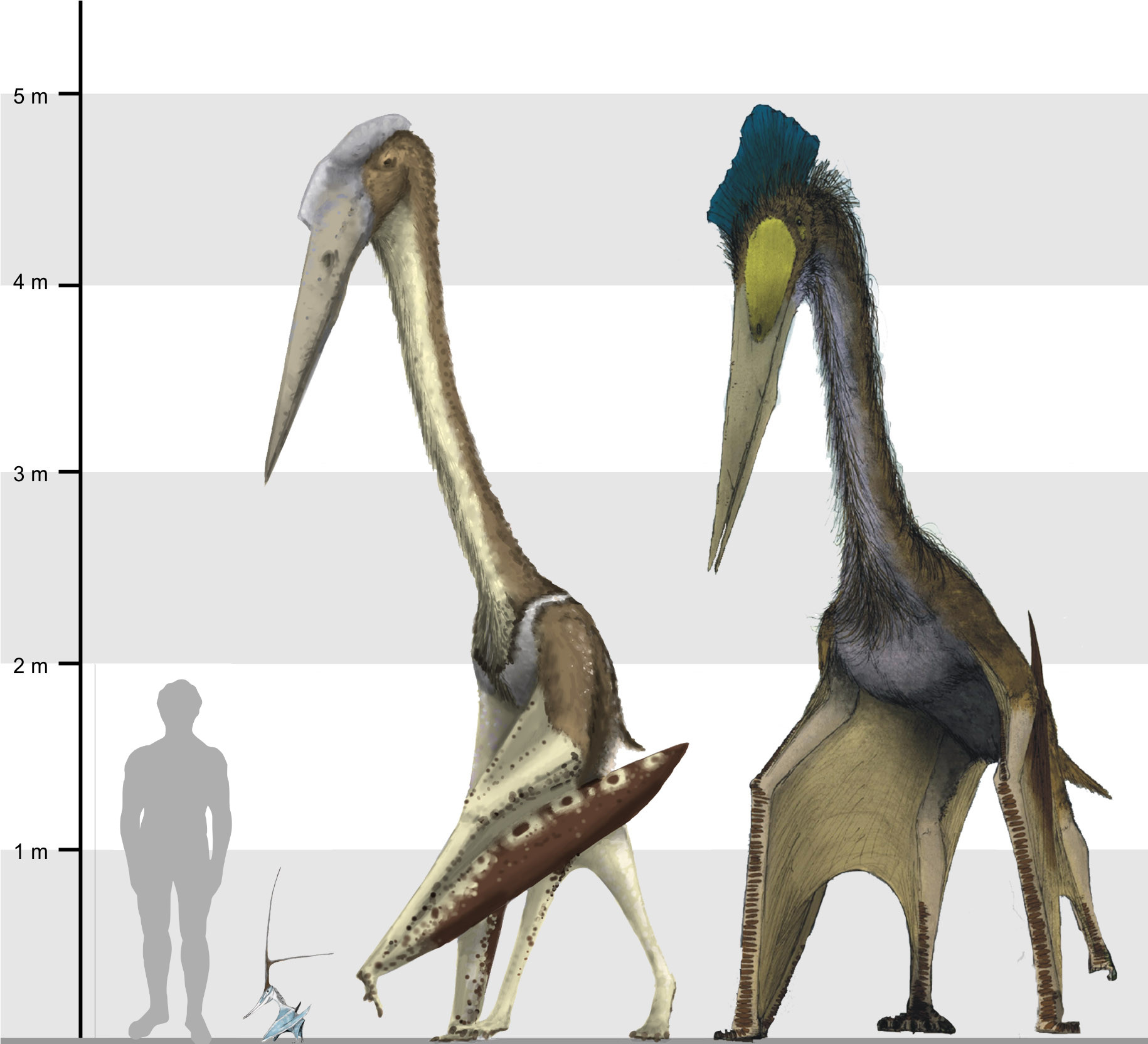
Size of Arambourgiania (center left) compared to a human, Nyctosaurus (beside the human), and Quetzalcoatlus northropi (right). Note the very similar size of Arambourgiania and Q. northropi.

Frey and Martill estimated the total length of the holotype individual at 77–78 cm (2 ft 6.31 in – 2 ft 6.71 in), using for comparison the relative position of the smallest diameter of the shaft of the fifth cervical vertebra of Quetzalcoatlus. The total neck length was extrapolated at about 3 m (9 ft 10 in) using the same method. This neck length is among the largest known for a non-sauropod tetrapod, exceeding those of animals like the extant giraffe, the extinct mammals Paraceratherium, the extinct reptile Tanystropheus, and dinosaurs like Gigantoraptor and Therizinosaurus. Applying that 1.18 ratio to the overall size, Frey and Martill concluded in the late 1990s that the wingspan of Arambourgiania was 11 to 13 m (36 to 43 ft), larger than the estimated wingspan of Quetzalcoatlus, which measured 10 to 11 m (33 to 36 ft). This would have made Arambourgiania the largest pterosaur known. In 1997, paleontologist Lorna Steel and colleagues reconstructed a life-sized skeleton of Arambourgiania based on better-known related pterosaurs. They set its wingspan at 11.5 m (38 ft), within the range of Frey and Martill's estimate.

Subsequent estimates were more moderate, which was due to the discovery of more complete, similarly-sized azhdarchids. In 2003, the researchers who described the related pterosaur Phosphatodraco stated that the wingspan of Arambourgiania was more likely about 7 m (23 ft), though this measurement was not given a rationale. In 2010, paleontologists Mark Witton and Michael Habib argued that a 7 m (23 ft) wingspan is an underestimate for Arambourgiania, while a 11 to 13 m (36 to 43 ft) wingspan would be too much.

In his 2022 pterosaur book, Paul proposed that Arambourgiania had a wingspan of 8 to 9 m (26 to 30 ft), making it smaller than Quetzalcoatlus northropi, which he kept at 10 to 11 m (33 to 36 ft). He also suggested that Arambourgiania had a smaller wingspan than Hatzegopteryx from Romania, which Paul situated at 10 to 12 m (33 to 39 ft). Just like both Arambourgiania and Quetzalcoatlus, Hatzegopteryx is also among the largest known flying animals to ever exist. In a 2024 study, the wingspan of Arambourgiania was estimated to be around 10 m (33 ft) based on a large humerus comparable in size to that of Q. northropi. This new estimate is slightly larger than Paul's 2022 estimate, but does not surpass the wingspan of Quetzalcoatlus. In 2018, the "Sidi Chennane Azhdarchid" ulna that was assigned to Arambourgiania was estimated to be smaller than other Arambourgiania individuals, with a wingspan of around 9 m (30 ft).

== Classification ==
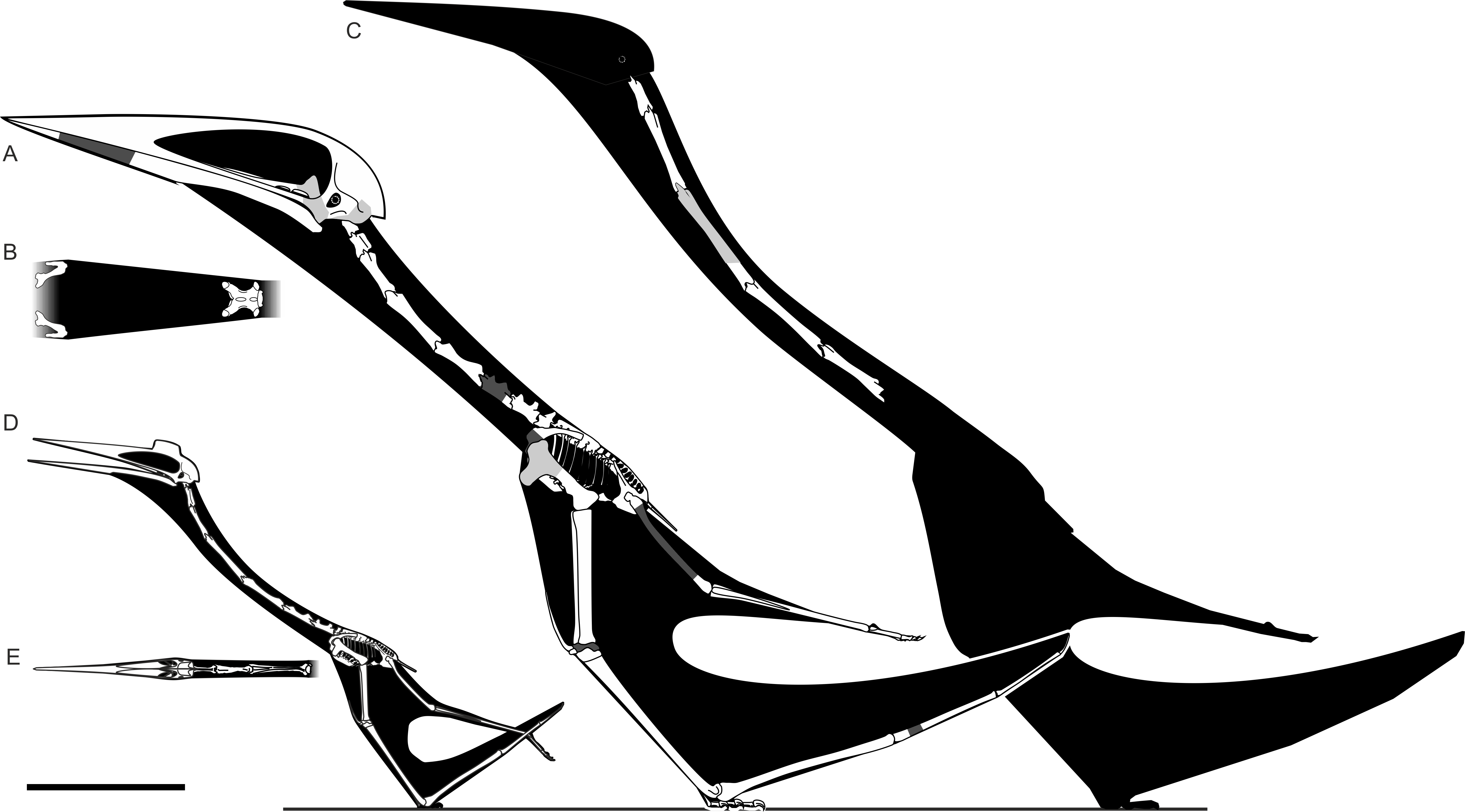
Skeletal reconstructions of Arambourgiania (C) and the related Hatzegopteryx (A), and Quetzalcoatlus lawsoni (D), with known parts in gray

Arambourgiania was assigned to a newly named subfamily called Azhdarchinae by Nessov in 1984, though it was still known as "Titanopteryx" at that time. Azhdarchinae also included the pterosaurs Azhdarcho and Quetzalcoatlus. Nessov assigned the Azhdarchinae to the family Pteranodontidae based on their toothless beaks. Unaware of the creation of Azhdarchinae, American paleontologist Kevin Padian created the family Titanopterygiidae, which included both "Titanopteryx" and Quetzalcoatlus. Titanopterygiidae was united based on the shape and proportions of the cervical vertebrae, and was differentiated from Pteranodontidae. Two years later, in 1986, Padian became aware of the existence of Azhdarchinae and declared his Titanopterygiidae to be a junior synonym of this taxon, as he believed that the diagnoses of the cervical vertebrae for both groups were identical. He removed Azhdarchinae from Pteranodontidae based on his previous diagnoses, and he would further elevate it to family level, creating Azhdarchidae as it is known today. Since the 1980s, many genera have been named or reassigned to the genus, with fossils of azhdarchids known from every continent besides Antarctica.

The classification of Arambourgiania as a derived (advanced) Azhdarchid in the subfamily Quetzalcoatlinae has been consistent in recent studies, though its exact position is disputed. One of its closest relatives is Quetzalcoatlus according to multiple phylogenetic analyses; these two genera are often recovered as sister taxa. However, several other studies instead favored a closer relationship between Arambourgiania and the azhdarchids Mistralazhdarcho and Aerotitan.

Below are two cladograms from different studies that show the position of Arambourgiania within Azhdarchidae. The first cladogram is based on the phylogenetic analysis by American paleontologist Brian Andres in 2021, which places Arambourgiania as the sister taxon of Quetzalcoatlus. The second cladogram is based on the 2023 study by paleontologist Rubi Pêgas and colleagues and placed Arambourgiania in a trichotomy with Mistralazhdarcho and Aerotitan.

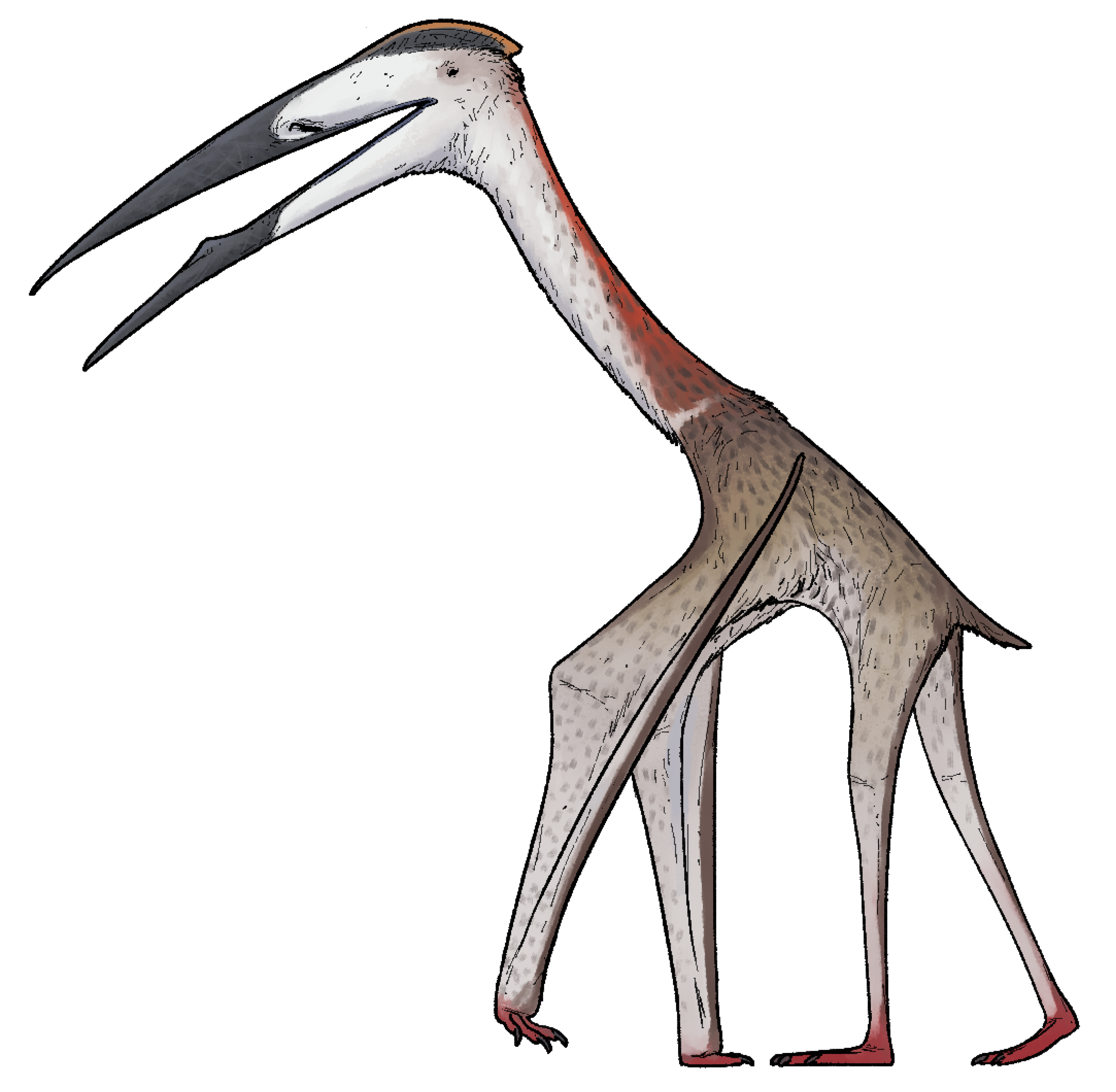

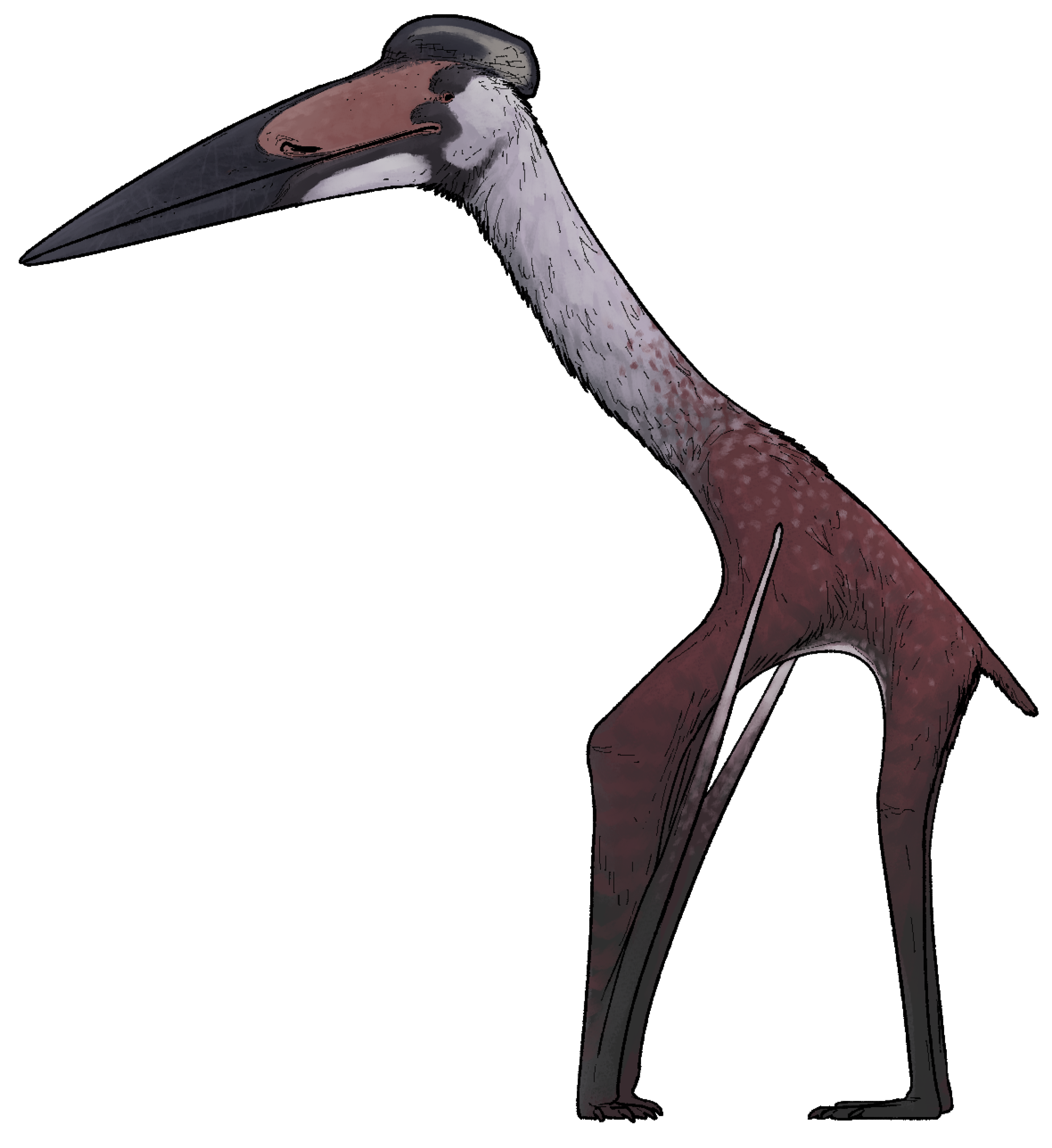
In some studies, the azhdarchids Mistralazhdarcho (above) and Aerotitan (below) have been recovered as the closest relatives of Arambourgiania

Topology 1: Andres (2021).

- Azhdarchidae
  - Azhdarchinae
    - Azhdarcho lancicollis
    - - Albadraco tharmisensis
      - - Aerotitan sudamericanus
        - Mistralazhdarcho maggii
  - Quetzalcoatlinae
    - - Aralazhdarcho bostobensis
      - Phosphatodraco mauritanicus
    - - Eurazhdarcho langendorfensis
      - - Zhejiangopterus linhaiensis
        - - Wellnhopterus brevirostris
          - Cryodrakon boreas
          - - Hatzegopteryx thambema
            - - Arambourgiania philadelphiae
              - - Quetzalcoatlus lawsoni
                - Quetzalcoatlus northropi

Topology 2: Pêgas and colleagues (2023).

- Azhdarchidae
  - - Eurazhdarcho langendorfensis
    - - Phosphatodraco mauritanicus
      - Wellnhopterus brevirostris
      - Aralazhdarcho bostobensis
  - - Zhejiangopterus linhaiensis
    - - Azhdarcho lancicollis
      - Quetzalcoatlinae
        - Cryodrakon boreas
        - - - Hatzegopteryx thambema
            - Albadraco tharmisensis
          - - - Quetzalcoatlus northropi
              - Quetzalcoatlus lawsoni
              - Quetzalcoatlus sp. (FSAC-OB 14)
            - - Mistralazhdarcho maggii
              - Aerotitan sudamericanus
              - Arambourgiania philadelphiae

== Paleobiology ==
=== Feeding and ecological niche ===
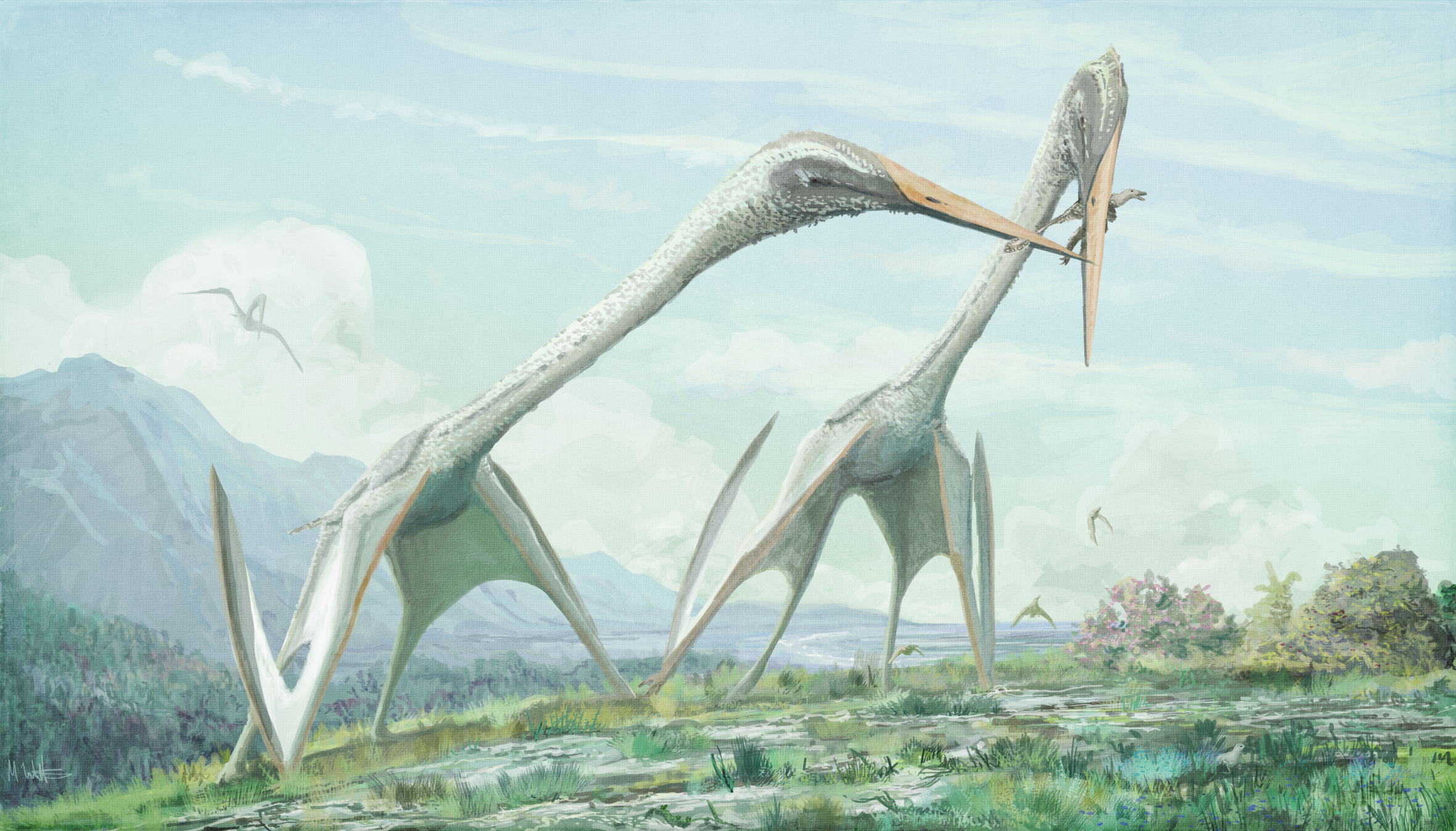
Life reconstruction of two Arambourgiania fighting over a small theropod

The ecological niche of azhdarchids have been debated among paleontologists. Mark Witton and Darren Naish noted in 2008 that azhdarchids have been historically considered as scavengers, aerial predators, stork-like generalists, or marine piscivores (fish-eaters) with similar methods of feeding seen in modern birds (i.e. probing, wading, swimming, etc.). Witton and Naish noted that it is unlikely for azhdarchids to have had a piscivorous lifestyle similar to modern skim-feeders like skimmers and some terns, which feed by trawling their lower jaws through water while flying and catching prey from the surface. Azhdarchids lacked cranial features such as sideways compressed lower jaws and the shock-absorbing adaptations required for this mode of feeding, and their jaws instead appeared to have been almost triangular in cross-section, unlike those of skim-feeders and probers.

Witton and Naish instead stated that azhdarchids probably inhabited inland environments, based on the localities where their fossils have been found in; more than half the fossils surveyed were from fluvial or alluvial deposits, and most of the marine occurrences also had fossils of terrestrial lifeforms. They also noted that the morphology of azhdarchids made them ill-suited for lifestyles other than wading and foraging terrestrially. The prevalence of Arambourgiania fossils in oceanic deposits suggests that it died while at sea or its bones were washed out. This includes the oceanic deposits at the Coon Creek Formation, the Ruseifa Formation, and the Khouribga Phosphates. However, in a 2021 study, Labita and Martill noted that azhdarchids might have been less terrestrial than suggested by Witton and Naish, since Moroccan azhdarchid fossils have been found in marine strata, as was Arambourgiania. Labita and Martill noted that no azhdarchids had been found in truly terrestrial strata, and proposed they could instead have been associated with aquatic environments, such as rivers, lakes, marine and off-shore settings.

=== Locomotion ===
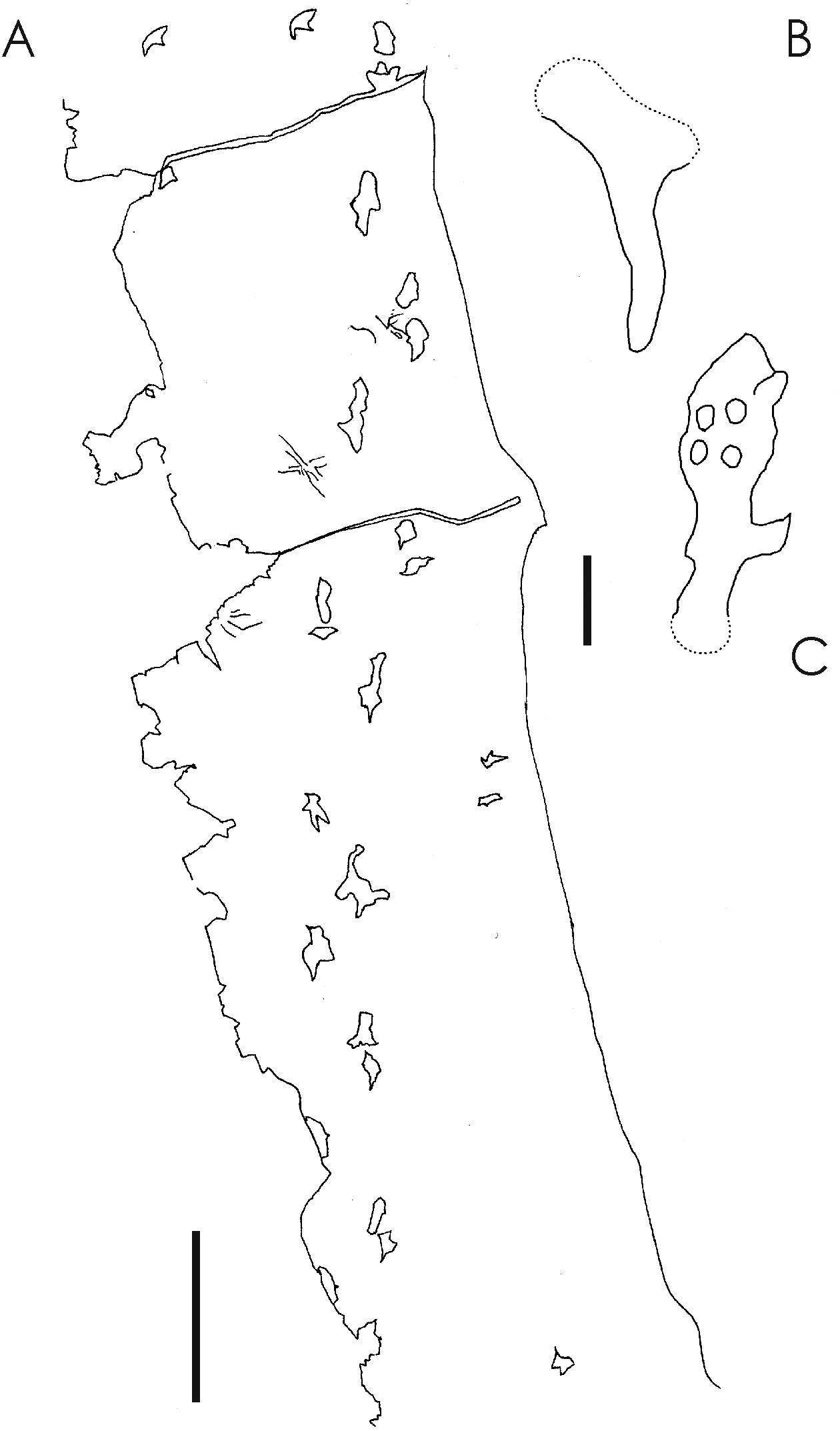
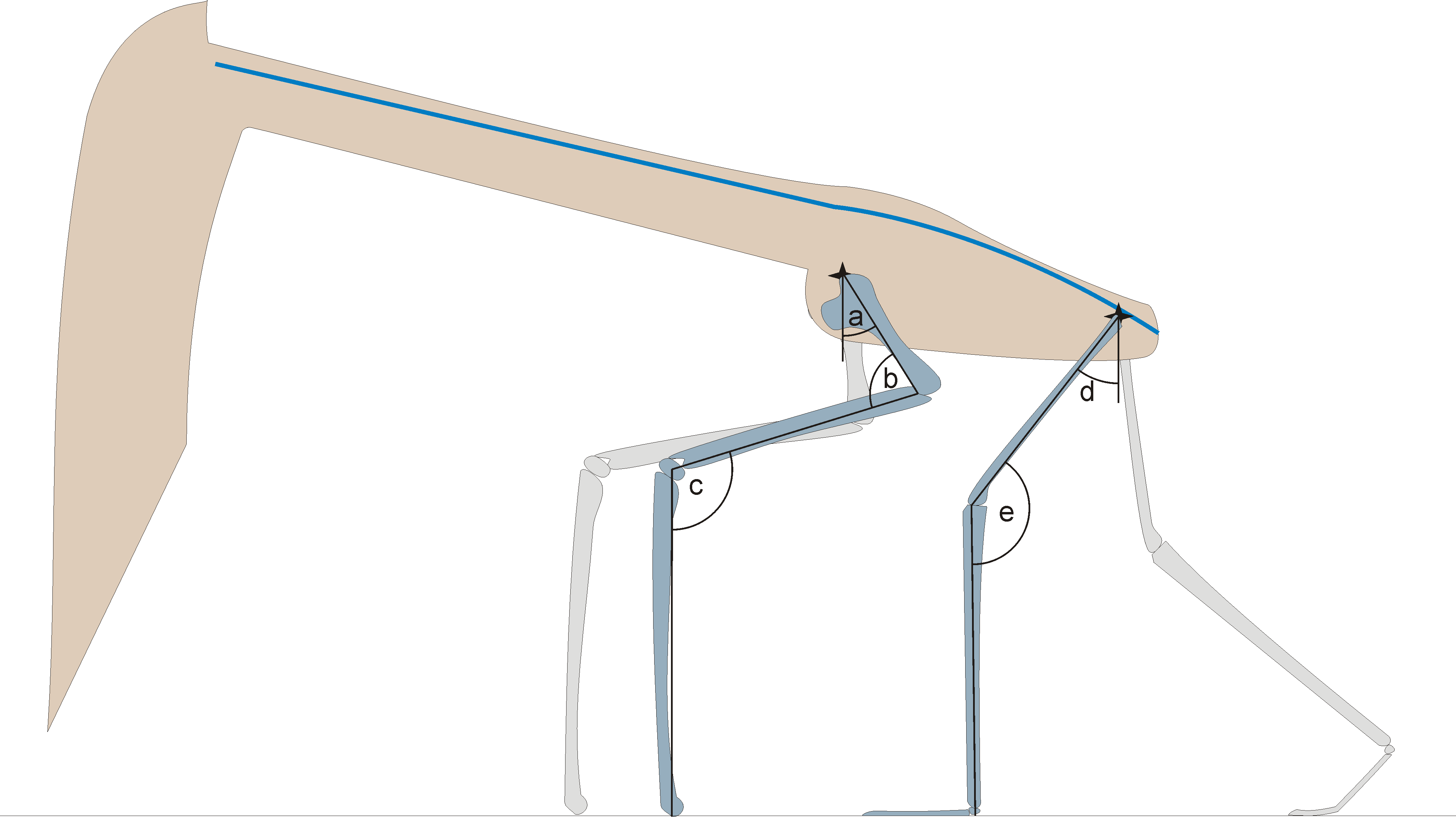
Possible azhdarchid trackway Haenamichnus from Korea (left) and feeding posture inferred from the tracks

Historically, azhdarchids have been interpreted as soarers, although some authors have suggested that their musculature allowed flapping flight like in swans and geese. Their short and potentially broad wings may have been suited for flying in terrestrial environments, as similar wing shapes can be found in large, terrestrially soaring birds. Albatross-like soaring has also been suggested, but in 2013, Witton considered this unlikely because of their supposed predominance in terrestrial environments and their adaptations for foraging on the ground. Studies of azhdarchid flight abilities indicate that they would have been able to fly for long and probably fast, especially if they had an adequate amount of fat and muscle as nourishment, so that geographical barriers would not present obstacles.

A 2024 study by paleontologist Kierstin Rosenbach and colleagues compared the humerus of Arambourgiania to that of soaring birds and suggested that Arambourgiania itself was also a soarer. The humeral shaft displays several adaptations to soaring flight, such as its arrangement of diaphyseal ridges which are similar to those in vultures. The humerus also lacks struts, a trait associated with torsional loadings from soaring. Soaring is defined as sustained powered flight that needs launch and maintenance flapping, whereas gliding is sustained by gravity. This is in contrast to the contemporary pterosaur Inabtanin, which had a style of flight closer to those of continuously flapping birds.

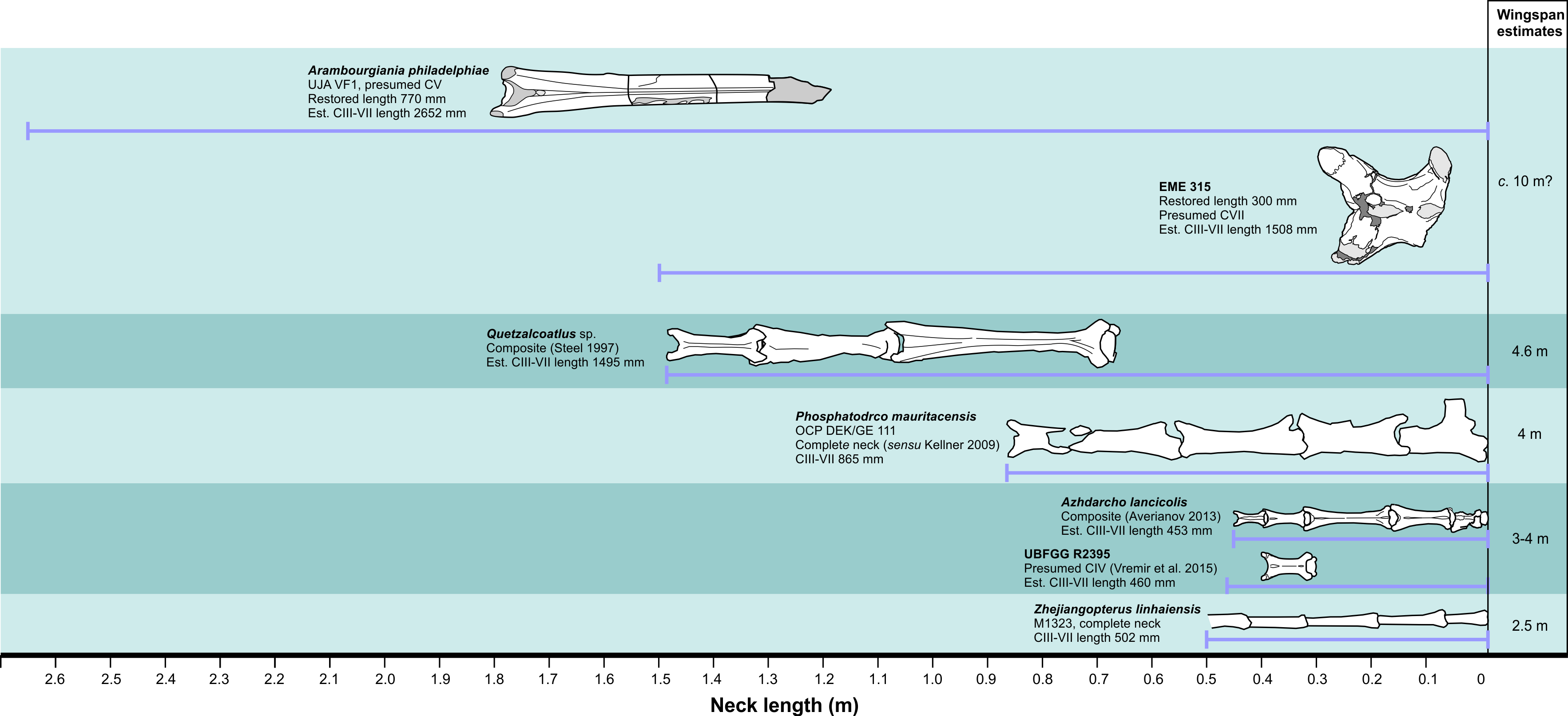
Length of the holotype cervical vertebra of Arambourgiania (first above) compared to other azhdarchid cervical vertebrae

Azhdarchids are the only group of pterosaurs to which trackways have been confidently assigned, such as Haenamichnus from Korea, which matches this group in shape, age, and size. One long trackway of this kind shows that azhdarchids walked with their limbs held directly underneath their body, and along with the morphology of their feet indicates they were more proficient on the ground than other pterosaurs.

=== Neck biomechanics ===
The lithe, thin-walled vertebrae of Arambourgiania indicate the neck was much weaker than that of Hatzegopteryx. This can be quantified using relative failure force, which is the bone failure force of a vertebra divided by the body weight of the pterosaur that it belongs to, estimated at 180 to 250 kg (400 to 550 lb) for Arambourgiania and Hatzegopteryx. While Arambourgiania's neck vertebrae fail at about half of its body weight, the posterior neck vertebrae of Hatzegopteryx can withstand anywhere between five and ten body weights, depending on the loading of the bone. Even the hypothetically longer anterior neck vertebrae of Hatzegopteryx would be able to withstand four to seven body weights. Although the centrum of Arambourgiania is much more lighltly built than that of Hatzegopteryx, their ratios of bone radius to bone thickness (R/t) are roughly the same (9.45 for Hatzegopteryx and 9.9 for Arambourgiania). This may represent a compromise between increasing bending strength and buckling strength. Higher R/t ratios lead to improved bending strength, but weaker buckling strength. To compensate for this, Hatzegopteryx shows a number of other adaptations to improve buckling strength, namely the distinctive internal structures of the bones and the large articular joints of the vertebrae, the latter of which helps to distribute stress. In order to support the robust head, the neck of Hatzegopteryx was likely strongly muscled, in contrast to that of Arambourgiania with its fewer muscle attachments.

== Paleoecology ==
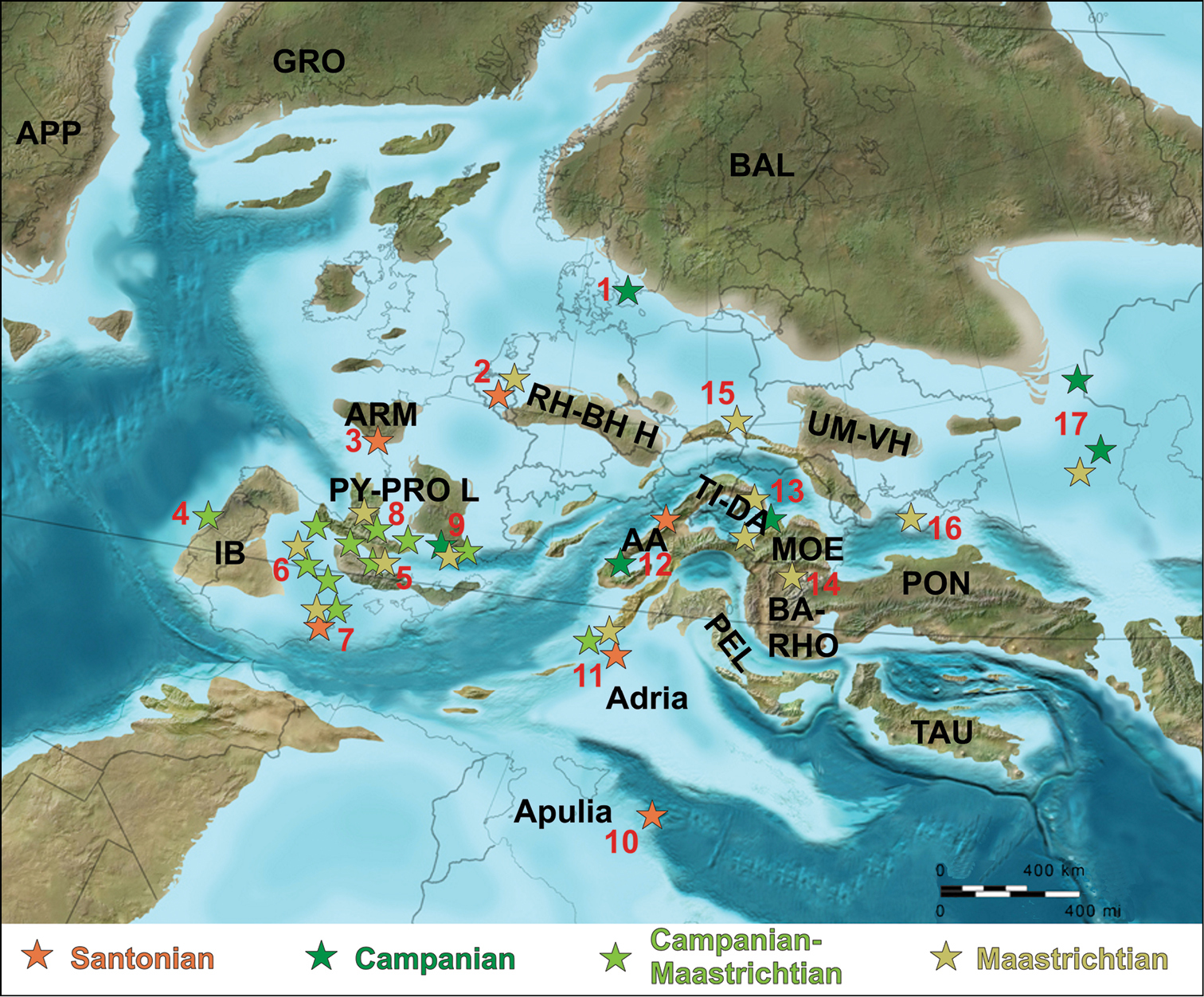
Map of Europe and the Middle East during the Maastrichtian, showing the extent of the Tethys Sea.

Fossils of Arambourgiania are confidently known only from Ruseifa, Jordan, though specimens potentially belonging to the genus have been described from Morocco and the Southern United States as well. In Jordan and Morocco, Arambourgiania fossils come from sites that during the Maastricthian were covered by the Tethys Sea. This was a large sea extending across Europe, the Middle East, and North Africa during the Late Cretaceous and Paleogene. Other Maastrichtian-aged azhdarchoids are known from the Tethys Sea as well, including Inabtanin from Jordan, Phosphatodraco from Morocco, Hatzegopteryx and several other azhdarchids from Romania, and indeterminate azhdarchids from Spain and France.

=== Jordan ===
In Jordan, Arambourgiania fossils have been unearthed from a series of phosphate mines in Ruseifa dating to the Maastrichtian age of the Late Cretaceous period (72-66 Ma). During this time period, Jordan was underwater and located at the southern margin of the Mediterranean Tethys Sea. Labeled as the Ruseifa Formation, the Amman Formation, or the Al-Hasa Formation, these phosphate mines are composed of four units, the first of which is the origin of many Arambourgiania fossils. They also make up the Balqa Group, along with the underlying Wadi Sir Formation and the overlying Muwaqqar Formation. The phosphates in which Arambourgiania was found have been interpreted as either a shallow marine environment, or a deep marine environment.

Fossils here are preserved through the infilling of bone by limestone matrix, resulting in well preserved, 3D fossils being available for study. Contemporary fauna to Arambourgiania from the phosphates includes a diversity of marine reptiles including the mosasaurids Globidens, Platecarpus, Prognathodon, and Halisaurus, many of which are known from teeth, indeterminate elasmosaurids, indeterminate chelonoids, and an isolated crocodyliform tooth. Fish are also prevalent in this formation, with bony fishes such as the enchodontid Enchodus, aulopiform Stratodus, pycnodontid Stephanodus, anguillioform Pseudoegertonia, and indeterminate pycnodontids. As for the cartilaginous fishes, the sharks Cretolamna, Scapanorhynchus, Squalicorax, Plicatoscyllium, and the ray Rhombodus have been found in the Ruseifa phosphates. This faunal composition is very similar to that of the Maastrichtian of Syria and the rest of the Mediterranean Tethys Sea.

== See also ==
- List of pterosaur genera
- Timeline of pterosaur research
- Pterosaur size
