= Coon Creek Formation =

Geologic formation located in the U.S.

Coon Creek
- Stratigraphic range: Early Maastrichtian
- Type: Formation or member
- Overlies: Selma Chalk

Lithology
- Other: Limestone, marl, sand, clay

Location
- Coordinates: 34.4°N 88.9°W
- Approximate paleocoordinates: 38.0°N 66.2°W
- Region: Tennessee, Mississippi
- Country: United States

Type section
- Named for: Coon Creek (Mississippi)
- Named by: B. Wade

The Coon Creek Formation or Coon Creek Tongue is a geologic unit and Konservat-Lagerstätte located in western Tennessee and extreme northeast Mississippi. It is a sedimentary sandy marl deposit, Late Cretaceous (Maastrichtian) in age, about 70 million years old. The formation is renowned for its pristine fossils of Late Cretaceous marine invertebrates, including gastropods, bivalves, decapod crustaceans, and ammonites, particularly at Coon Creek in McNairy County, Tennessee, which the formation is named for. It is also known for producing fosslis of marine vertebrates, such as mosasaurs and plesiosaurs. Notable fossils from this formation is the gastropod Turritella, the bivalve Pterotrigonia thoracica (the state fossil of Tennessee), as well as other fossils such as crabs.

The site was discovered in 1915 by Bruce Wade. It is alternately considered its own geologic formation (as the Coon Creek Formation) or a distinct member of the wider Ripley Formation (as the Coon Creek Member or the Coon Creek Tongue).

== Age ==
Geologists employ biostratigraphy, the use of index fossils, for dating sedimentary rock units like the Coon Creek. Index fossils are species of plants or animals that existed over a wide area for a geologically short period of time . The cephalopod Jeletzkytes nodosus is a time-sensitive fossil found in rocks a little younger than 70.6 million years old in the western United States. Other index fossils from Coon Creek date a little older than 70.6 million years. The overlap indicates that Coon Creek sediments were probably deposited between 70 and 71 million years ago.

== Origins ==
The Mississippi Embayment extends roughly north–south from central Mississippi to southern Illinois. It was formed when the North American continent, driven by tectonic forces passed over a magma hotspot. The region had been weakened by rifts and faults during the breakup of Rodinia nearly 1 billion years ago. The pressure of the hotspot caused the rifted region to rise nearly 2 km from western Kentucky to northwestern Louisiana in an arch 300 km. wide. Millions of years of sediment were subjected to erosion and nearly all of the uplift was carried away. When the continent moved west past the hotspot, the cooled land minus the eroded 2 kilometers created a deep trough. When sea level rose nearly 500 feet, the trench was filled with seawater. The Mississippi Embayment stretched West from the Tennessee Valley to the area of Little Rock, Arkansas. It may have been 1,000 feet deep where Memphis is now. The embayment gradually filled with sand, clay, and gravel brought in by rivers on uplands to the north, east, and west .

The sediments of Coon Creek were deposited near the end of the Cretaceous Period, around 71 million years ago. At that time western Tennessee, eastern Arkansas, western Kentucky, and southeast Missouri were submerged beneath the Mississippi Embayment, an extension of the Gulf of Mexico. Coon Creek was formed in shallow coastal water probably less than 100 feet deep .

== Ecology ==
The margins of the bay teemed with marine life. Crabs, snails, lobsters, clams, scallops, whelks, nautilus, sharks, and other familiar animals lived in the warm, shallow sea, eating, reproducing, and being eaten Sohl 1960Sohl 1964. Giant reptilian mosasaurs, highly ornamented cephalopods, and other less familiar sea creatures lived in the water. Their shells, bones, carapaces, teeth, and other hard parts were constantly being buried in the sandy mud of the seafloor. The lack of distinct layering indicates that clams, shrimps, and other burrowing organisms mixed the bottom sediments. Periodic hurricanes may have brought in heavy loads of river sediment to bury the plants and animals living there. Conditions for life were ideal; the water was warm and of normal salinity . Wave action ensured sufficient oxygenation for animal life.

The seafloor was heavily populated with shellfish, crabs, and lobsters. Huge plesiosaurs, marine crocodiles, sea turtles, and mosasaurs shared the waters with sharks and fierce fanged-tooth fishes. The climate was warmer than today. Coon Creek was semi-tropical, like present-day southern Florida . Heavy waves from severe tropical storms constantly churned up shallower parts of the seafloor.

Many rivers fed into the sea bringing leaves and driftwood from the land. These served as the base of the food chain. Bacteria and other microscopic scavengers ate the decaying wood. Plankton ate the bacteria. Clams filtered the small plankton. Snails ate the clams and were eaten in turn by crabs and fish. Mosasaurs and cephalopods ate the fish and crabs. Some organisms were swimmers or floaters, but most lived on or in the sandy mud of the sea bottom. This layer of sandy clay, bones, and shells became the Coon Creek Formation.

=== Dinosaurs ===
As of 2016, the only known dinosaurs found in this region include the remains of indeterminate hadrosaur remains, as complete fossil skeletons of dinosaurs are a rarity in Appalachia. Sometimes the dried carcasses of dinosaurs were washed out to sea by rivers. Dinosaur bones and teeth have been found in marine deposits in Mississippi. It is possible that dinosaur bones will turn up at Coon Creek someday. The remains of at least two mosasaurs have been found. They were not dinosaurs but large aquatic lizards that could reach lengths of up to 45 feet. They were carnivorous and would have been the top of the food chain in the Coon Creek area.

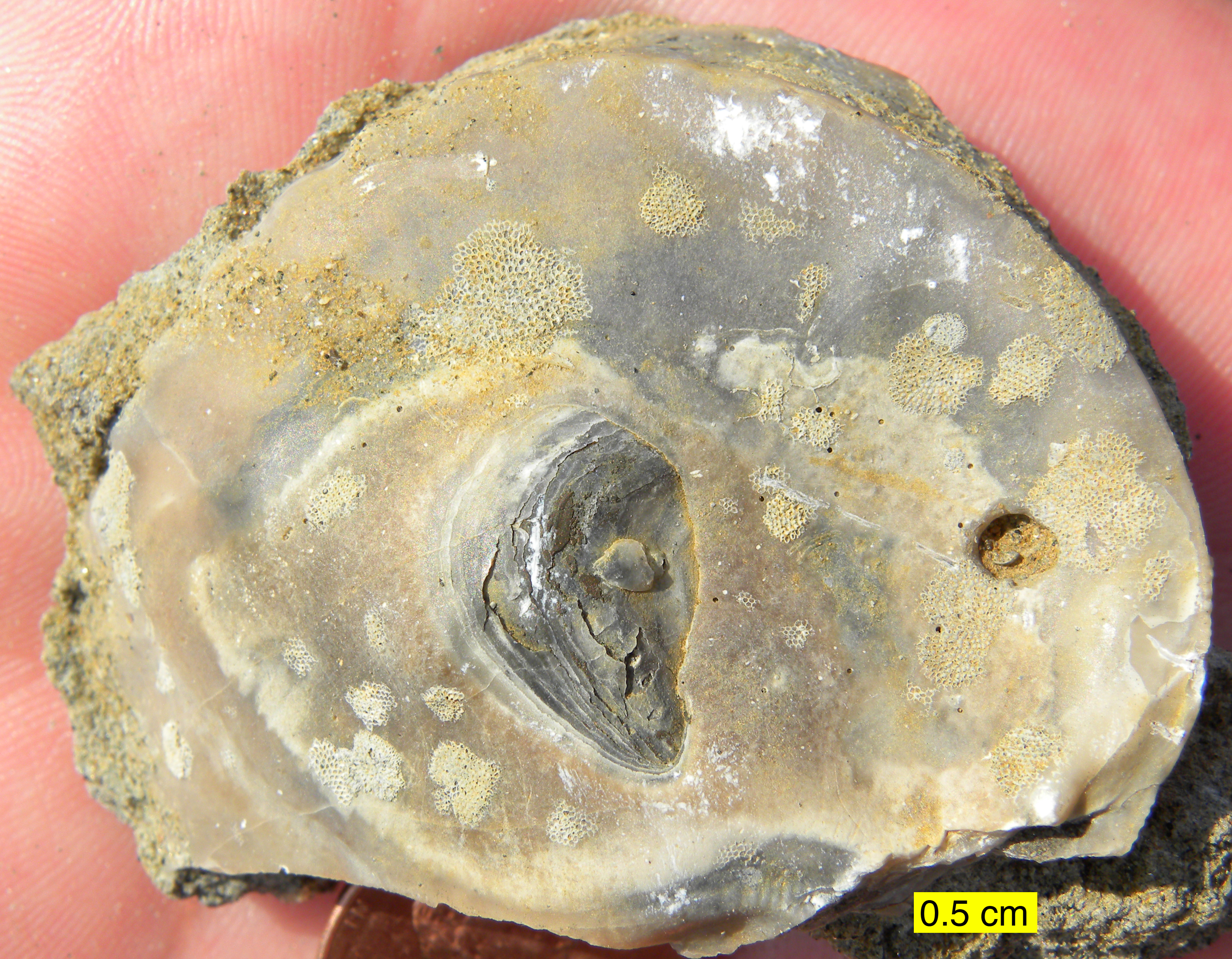
Bryozoans encrusting the right valve interior of an oyster from the Coon Creek Beds of the Ripley Formation (Upper Cretaceous) near Blue Springs, Mississippi.

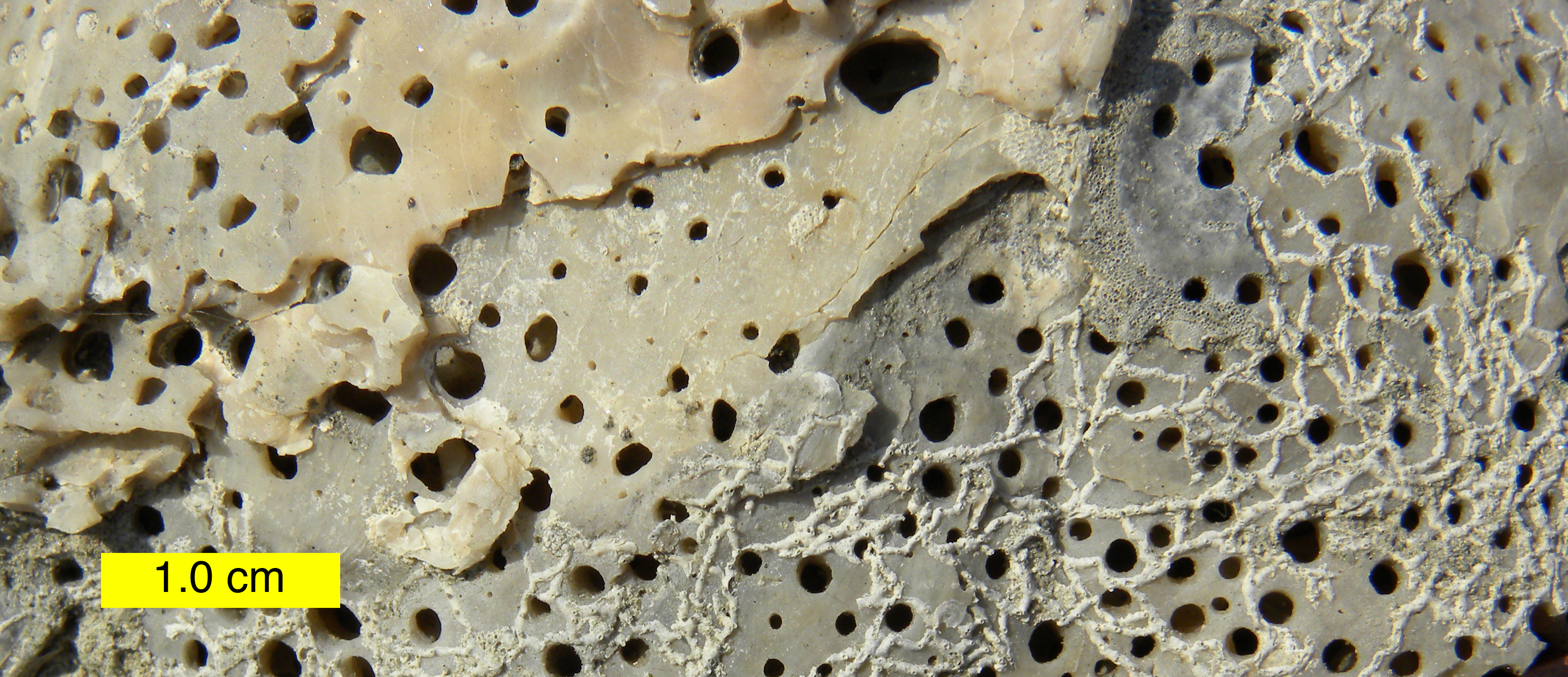
Entobia borings and the cyclostome bryozoan Voigtopora thurni on an oyster valve from the Coon Creek Beds of the Ripley Formation (Upper Cretaceous) near Blue Springs, Mississippi.

== Fossils ==
Most organisms are not preserved as fossils. Unless covered quickly after death, their bodies are consumed by other animals and plants or destroyed by weather. Even the bones and shells of animals that were quickly buried after death may be later dissolved by groundwater. The clay in the sediment at Coon Creek sealed off the fragile fossils from the corrosive action of water and the hard parts of the clams, snails, crabs, and shrimps were well preserved. Occasionally the bones of vertebrates are found, as well as the cartilaginous vertebrae of sharks. Fish scales and plant leaves are sometimes found as well . The Coon Creek Formation has one of the highest densities of fossil in Eastern North America. Crustacean fossils have also been unearthed in the Coon Creek Formation as well. Pterosaur fossils, mainly belonging to azhdarchids like Arambourgiania, have been unearthed here.

== Importance ==
Coon Creek is widely recognized as a Konservat-Lagerstätte for its exquisitely preserved specimens. Coon Creek has been named as one of the country's top twelve fossils sites for several reasons .

• The fossils are found in their original state. The hard shells have not been permeated by groundwater and not replaced by minerals.

• The number of fossils is stupendous. Many times you will literally find fossils on top of fossils. Most fossil sites require concentrated efforts to find a representative sample of the fossils.

• There is a rich diversity of animals with over 600 different species of organisms found.

• Because the Coon Creek Formation sediment is unconsolidated, it makes it very easy to collect and prepare the fossils.

== See also ==
- List of fossil sites (with link directory)
- Coon Creek Science Center
