= Waide =

Waide is a variant of the English surname Wade.

Notable people sharing this surname include:

- Eoin Waide (21st century) of Ireland
- Scott Waide (born 1977) of New Zealand
- Ben Waide (born 1963) of the United States
