= Thomas Wade =

Thomas Wade may refer to:

Thomas Wade

- Thomas Wade, a fictional officer, industrial leader and Swordholder contender in Liu Cixin's Death's End (2010).
- Thomas Wade, character in 3 Body Problem (TV series)
- Thomas Wade (Methodist), Irish Methodist
- Thomas Wade (North Carolina politician) (1720–1786), Revolutionary War officer and politician from North Carolina
- Thomas Wade (singer) (born 1961), Canadian country music artist
- Thomas Wade (writer) (1805–1875), English poet and dramatist
- Thomas Francis Wade (1818–1895), British diplomat and Sinologist
- Thomas James Wade (1893–1969), Roman Catholic bishop
- Thomas M. Wade (1860–1929), educator, politician, and civic leader from Louisiana

Tom Wade

- Tom Wade (footballer) (1909–?), English footballer
- Tom Wade (cricketer) (1910–1987), English cricketer

Tommy Wade

- Tommy Wade (born 1942), American football player
- Tommy Wade (Australian footballer) (1894–1939), Australian rules footballer
