= Karim Bibi Triki =

Algerian politician

- كريم بيبي تريكي
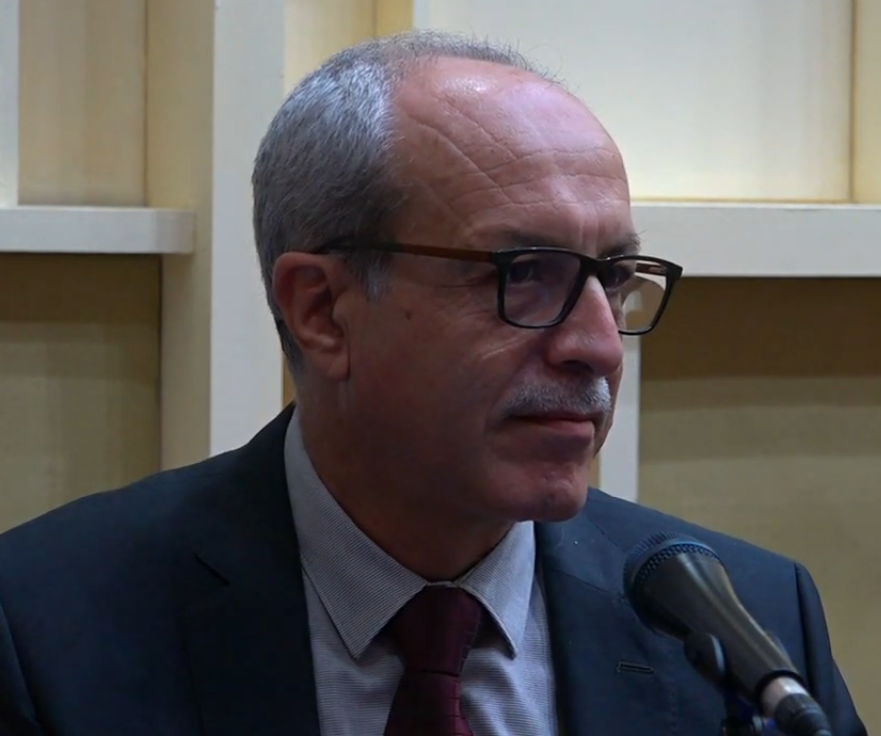
- Triki in 2022

Minister of Post and Telecommunications
- In office 8 July 2021 – 19 November 2024
- President: Abdelmadjid Tebboune
- Prime Minister: Aymen Benabderrahmane; Nadir Larbaoui
- Preceded by: Sid Ahmed Ferroukhi (interim); Brahim Boumzar
- Succeeded by: Sid Ali Zerrouki

Personal details
- Born: 16 August 1968 (age 58) Oran, Algeria
- Education: Lycée Colonel Lotfi (B); University of Science and Technology (MSc)

Karim Bibi Triki (Arabic: كريم بيبي تريكي; born 16 August 1968) is the Algerian Minister of Post and Telecommunications. He was appointed as minister on 8 July 2021.

== Education ==
Triki holds a Bachelor of Mathematics (1986) from the Lycée Colonel Lotfi and a Master in Electronics (1991) from the University of Science and Technology.

== Career ==
From 1994 until 1996, Triki was a Reserve Second Lieutenant in the Algerian Air Force.

Between 1992 and 2009, he worked for ALFATRON Electronic Industries. He was the Development Engineer from 1992 until 1996. In 1997, he was appointed Director of Engineering and Development. In 1999, Triki became Deputy General Manager. From 2001 until 2009, he was the Chairman and CEO of ALFATRON.

From 2009 until 2020, Triki held several positions at Intel Corporation, including Business Development Manager, Country Manager for North Africa and Country Lead of Intel.

Between 2020 and 2021, he served as the Chairman and CEO at Groupe Télécom Algérie.

Since 7 July 2021, Triki has been the Minister of Post and Telecommunications.
