= Titanopteryx =

Titanopteryx may refer to:

- Titanopteryx Enderlein, 1934, a genus of flies, now a synonym of Simulium, subgenus Byssodon Enderlein, 1925
- †Titanopteryx Arambourg, 1959, a genus pterosaurs, now a synonym of Arambourgiania Nessov et al., 1987
