= Edward Wade (disambiguation) =

Edward Wade (1802–1866) was an American politician.

Edward Wade (or variants) may also refer to:

- Ed Wade (born 1956), baseball executive
- Eddie Wade (1948–2025), Irish politician
- Ned Wade (hurler) (1911–1992), Irish hurler
- Ted Wade (Australian footballer) (1884–1966), Australian rules footballer
- Ted Wade (footballer, born 1901) (1901–?), English football player
