= Robert Wade =

Robert Wade may refer to:

- Robert Wade (born 1962), half of the British screenwriting duo Neal Purvis and Robert Wade
- Robert Wade (chess player) (1921–2008), New Zealand and British chess player
- Robert Wade (cricketer) (born 1968), English cricketer
- Robert Wade (scholar) (born 1944), New Zealand development scholar
- Robert Wade (surgeon) (1798–1872), British surgeon
- Robert Wade (watercolour artist) (1930–2024), Australian artist
- Robert E. Wade (1933–2023), Canadian politician
- Robert F. Wade (20th century), Knights of Columbus executive

== See also ==
- Bob Wade (artist) (1943–2019), American artist; born Robert Schrope Wade
- Bob Wade (basketball) (born 1944), American football player and basketball coach; born Robert Pernell Wade
- Bobby Wade (born 1981), professional American football wide receiver; born Robert Louis Wade, Jr.
- Whit Masterson (1920–2012), American author/screenwriter; born Robert Allison Wade
- John Wade (American football) (born 1975), American NFL football player; Robert John Wade
