= Thomas Wade (Methodist) =

Thomas Wade (Methodist) (fl. 1749) was a native of Fairfield, Aughrim, and is notable as the person who invited John Wesley to preach at Eyrecourt in May 1749. Wesley spoke of the large handsome room in the Market House in which he preached.
