= Oulton Wade, Baron Wade of Chorlton =

The Right Honourable The Lord Wade of Chorlton JP
- Wade in 2014

Member of the House of Lords
- Lord Temporal
- Life peerage 16 May 1990 – 1 November 2016

Personal details
- Born: 24 December 1932
- Died: 7 June 2018 (aged 85)
- Party: Crossbencher
- Education: Queen's University of Belfast

William Oulton Wade, Baron Wade of Chorlton, JP (24 December 1932 – 7 June 2018) was a British politician, businessman and agriculturalist.

Wade was educated at Birkenhead School and the Queen's University of Belfast. He was an elected member of Cheshire County Council between 1973 and 1977, and then Joint Treasurer of the Conservative Party from 1982 to 1990.

Having been awarded a Knighthood in the 1982 Birthday Honours, which was conferred by The Queen on 14 December 1982, Wade was elevated to the House of Lords being created a life peer on 16 May 1990 with the title Baron Wade of Chorlton, of Chester in the County of Cheshire. He sat as a Conservative in the House until his retirement on 1 November 2016.

On 9 November 2007, he became an honorary graduand of the University of Chester, where he was presented for admission to the degree of Doctor of Letters, honoris causa.

In the Lords, he served as a member of the Science and Technology Select Committee, and later as chairman of the House of Lords Science and Technology Report ‘Chips for Everything’. He was chair of the English Cheese Export Council from 1982 to 1984, and was president of the Combined Heat and Power Association. He became a freeman of the City of London in 1980.

Wade died on 7 June 2018, at the age of 85.

== Arms ==
Coat of arms of Oulton Wade, Baron Wade of Chorlton
Crest In front of a garb Or a ploughshare Azure. Escutcheon Or on a fess between three cheese presses Azure three roundels Or. Supporters On either side a shire horse Azure each resting the interior hoof on a roundel Or. Motto E Labore Prosperitas
