= Nan Wade =

External image
- Nan Wade doll in the Manx Museum

Nan Wade was a Manx wise woman and herbalist. She became one of the island's best known practitioners of folk medicine in the 19th-century. Sources have attributed the alias to two women: Ann Wade (née Cannell; 1768–1844) and her daughter Ann Boyde (née Wade; 1796–1866). William Harrison described the "mantle" as having "descended to her daughter".

Originally from Kirk Michael, Nan's house was located by the Rhenass River ford in Poortown, a hamlet in German.

== Activity ==
There survive several contemporary anecdotes of Nan Wade being called upon by residents of the Isle of Man for charms "to avert misfortune or cure disease", as well as clairvoyance and good luck. Many of these anecdotes were collected by Sophia Morrison. The charms were incanted while herbs were "lifted" (not picked). It was common for people to seek folk remedies at the time, particularly if they could not afford to see a medical doctor, with one of Morrison's witnesses praising the "only sixpence she was asking". Examples of other kinds of charms included "giving away the luck" to fishermen for a good catch and clairvoyance.

== Legacy ==
In the decades after her death, it became a tradition in the Isle of Man to pick leaves from Nan Wade's grave for good luck or protection. This was referred to as picking "a bit of Nan Wade".

A 19th-century doll of Nan Wade is kept in the Manx Museum. The doll is 42 cm tall.
