= Ned Wade (hurler) =

Irish hurler

Personal information
- Native name: Éamonn Mac Uaid (Irish)
- Born: 25 April 1911 Boherlahan, County Tipperary, Ireland
- Died: 4 May 1992

Sport
- Sport: Hurling
- Position: Midfield
Clubs
- Years: Club
- Boherlahan–Dualla; Faughs
Inter-county
- Years: County
- 1931 1932-1937 1938 1940-1947: Tipperary; Dublin; Tipperary; Dublin
Inter-county titles
- Leinster titles: 3
- All-Irelands: 0
- NHL: 0

Ned Wade (1911-4 May 1992) was an Irish hurler who played as a midfielder and as a centre-forward for the Tipperary and Dublin senior teams.

Born in Boherlahan, County Tipperary, Wade first arrived on the inter-county scene at the age of seventeen when he first linked up with the Tipperary minor team before later joining the junior side. He joined the senior panel during the 1931 championship. Wade subsequently joined the Dublin senior team and won three Leinster medals. He was an All-Ireland runner-up on four occasions.

As a member of the Leinster inter-provincial team on a number of occasions, Wade won three Railway Cup medals. At club level he was a seven-time cham pionship medallist with Faughs. He began his club career with Boherlahan–Dualla.

Wade retired from inter-county hurling following the conclusion of the 1946 championship.

== Honours ==
=== Team ===
Faughs

- Dublin Senior Hurling Championship (7): 1936, 1939, 1940, 1941, 1944, 1945, 1946

Tipperary

- All-Ireland Junior Hurling Championship (1): 1930
- Munster Junior Hurling Championship (1): 1930
- All-Ireland Minor Hurling Championship (1): 1930
- Munster Minor Hurling Championship (1): 1930

Dublin

- Leinster Senior Hurling Championship (3): 1934, 1942, 1944

Leinster

- Railway Cup (3): 1933, 1936, 1941

Sporting positions
Preceded by	Dublin Senior Hurling Captain; 1940-1941	Succeeded by Frank White
