= 1930 All-Ireland Minor Hurling Championship =

All-Ireland Minor Hurling Championship 1930
All Ireland Champions
- Winners: Tipperary (1st win)
- Captain: Jack Russell

All Ireland Runners-up
- Runners-up: Kilkenny
- Captain: Milo Kennedy

Provincial Champions
- Munster: Tipperary
- Leinster: Kilkenny
- Ulster: Down
- Connacht: Not Played

The 1930 All-Ireland Minor Hurling Championship was the third staging of the All-Ireland Minor Hurling Championship since its establishment by the Gaelic Athletic Association in 1928.

Waterford entered the championship as the defending champions, however, they were beaten by Tipperary in the Munster semi-final.

On 28 September 1930 Tipperary won the championship following a 4-1 to 2-1 defeat of Kilkenny in the All-Ireland final. This was their first All-Ireland title.

== Results ==
=== Leinster Minor Hurling Championship ===
Final

3 August 1930 Final	Kilkenny	6-3 - 3-5	Laois	Nowlan Park, Kilkenny

=== Munster Minor Hurling Championship ===
Final

24 September 1930 Final	Cork	3-0 - 4-3	Tipperary	The Mardyke, Cork

=== All-Ireland Minor Hurling Championship ===
Semi-final

24 August 1930 Semi-final	Kilkenny	13-11 - 2-1	Down	Croke Park, Dublin

Final

28 September 1930 Final	Tipperary	4-1 - 3-1	Kilkenny	Croke Park, Dublin
				Referee: S Jordan (Galway)

== Statistics ==
=== Miscellaneous ===
- The Ulster Championship is contested for the first time.
- The All-Ireland final was played as a triple-header of games at Croke Park. The other two games were the All-Ireland junior hurling semi-final replay between Kilkenny and Tipperary and the All-Ireland football final between Kerry and Monaghan.
