= Willoughby Francis Wade =

Irish physician (1827–1906)

- Born: 31 August 1827; Bray, County Wicklow
- Died: 28 May 1906 (aged 78); Rome
- Education: Trinity College, Dublin
- Known for: proposal for endowment of research scholarships by the British Medical Association
- Medical career
- Institutions: Queen's Hospital, Birmingham; Birmingham General Hospital

Sir Willoughby Francis Wade FRCP (31 August 1827 – 28 May 1906) was a British physician, surgeon, and professor of medicine.

== Biography ==
After education at Brighton College and then from 1842 to 1845 at Rugby School, he matriculated in 1845 at Trinity College, Dublin. He graduated there B.A. in 1849 and M.B. in 1851, after being apprenticed in Derby to the surgeon Douglas Fox, brother of Sir Charles Douglas Fox. After graduating in 1851 and being admitted M.R.C.S. (England) in 1851, Wade held junior appointments at the Birmingham General Hospital and in 1855 set up his medical practice in the city of Birmingham. He was appointed in 1857 to the staff of the Birmingham General Dispensary and in 1860 to the Queen's Hospital, Birmingham. He qualified M.R.C.P. (London) in 1859 and was elected F.R.C.P. in 1872. He retired in 1898.

He was knighted in 1896 for professional skill and for his work in furthering the interests of medical men, especially as President of the British Medical Association during the Birmingham meeting of 1890.

In 1896 Wade was made Honorary M.D. of Dublin. He published many articles in medical journals and was the first to draw attention to the presence of albuminuria in diphtheria.

In 1880 in Wandsworth, London, Wade married his cousin Augusta Frances (1836–1916), daughter of Sir John Power, 2nd Baronet, of Kilfane; the marriage was without issue. In 1898 Willoughby and Augusta Wade retired to a villa near Florence and in 1905 moved to Rome. Sir Thomas Francis Wade was his cousin.

== Selected publications ==
- Wade, W. F. (1875). "An Address on the Use of Empiricism in the Art of Medicine: Delivered before the Birmingham and Midland Counties Branch". British Medical Journal. 2 (772): 481–485. doi:10.1136/bmj.2.772.481. PMC 2297727.
- Wade, W. F. (1890). "President's Address, Delivered at the Fifty-Eighth Annual Meeting of the British Medical Association". British Medical Journal. 2 (1544): 259–262. doi:10.1136/bmj.2.1544.259. PMC 2207634.
- On Gout: As a Peripheral Neurosis (1893)
