= Wadey =

Wadey is a surname. Notable people with the surname include:

- Alan Wadey (born 1950), English cricketer
- Ben Wadey (born 1993), English television producer
