= Justice Wade =

Justice Wade may refer to:

- Gary R. Wade (fl. 1970s–2010s), associate justice of the Tennessee Supreme Court
- Lester A. Wade (1889–1966), associate justice of the Utah Supreme Court
