= Robert F. Wade =

Knights of Columbus executive

Robert F. Wade was the Deputy Supreme Knight of the Knights of Columbus from 1997 to 2000. In this role, he was a speaker at the 25th annual March for Life. As Supreme Treasurer, Wade was the chief coordinator for Pope John Paul II's trip to the Aqueduct Racetrack.

Previously, he was state deputy of New Jersey from 1981 to 1983.
