= Pseudoegertonia =

Pseudoegertonia Temporal range: Danian

Scientific classification
- Kingdom: Animalia
- Phylum: Chordata
- Class: Actinopterygii
- Division: Teleostei
- Order: Anguilliformes
- Genus: †Pseudoegertonia; Dartevelle & Casier, 1949

Extinct genus of fishes

Pseudoegertonia is an extinct genus of prehistoric bony fish that lived during the Maastrichtian age of the Cretaceous period and Danian age of the Paleocene epoch.

== See also ==
- Prehistoric fish
- List of prehistoric bony fish
