= Bruce Wade =

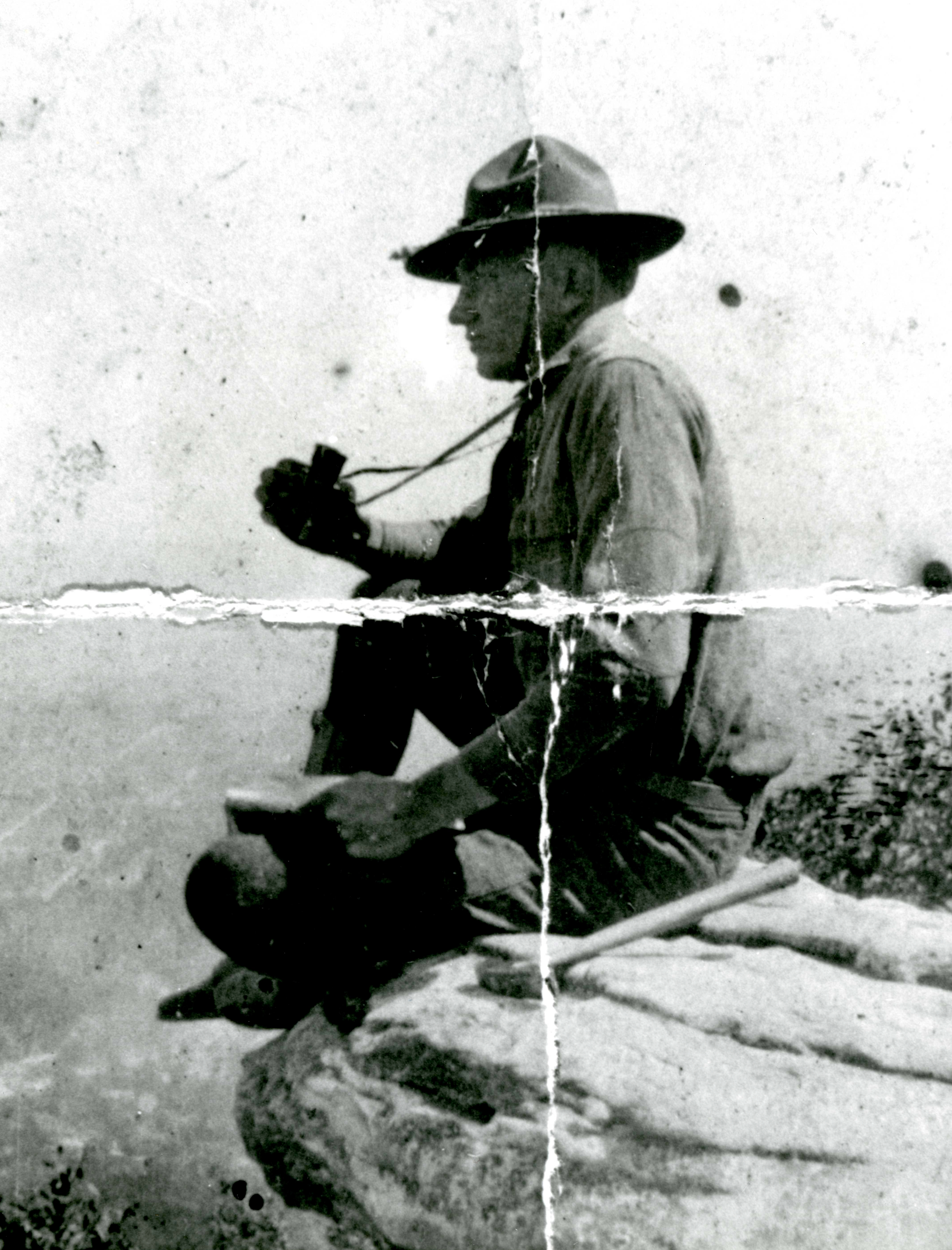
Wade in the field in 1914

Robert Bruce Wade (11 November 1889 – 25 June 1973) was an American geologist and paleontologist. He discovered the fossil site of Coon Creek, Tennessee, when he was 26, and described numerous fossils from the area.

Wade was born to Sara Mitchell and Robert Bruce in Trenton, Tennessee. He was educated at Trenton and Peabody High School before joining Fitzgerald and Clark School in 1907. A brother Wallace became a football coach at the University of Alabama. Bruce joined Vanderbilt University in 1909 and received a bachelor's degree in 1913 and a master's in 1914. He studied geology under L. C. Glenn who worked with the Tennessee Geological Survey and likely influenced Wade to go to Johns Hopkins for his doctorate in 1914. Here he worked under W. B Clarke and Edward W. Berry. He travelled widely examining geological formations around Decatur, Chester and McNairy counties by motorcycle. He discovered the first amber fossil of an insect in North America in Hardin county. In 1915 he found Coon Creek in Dave Weeks farm. He received his doctorate with a dissertation titled "the gastropoda of the Ripley Formation, Tennessee" in 1917. During World War I, Wade volunteered with the US Army and went to Europe with the 350th Field Artillery. He returned wounded to the Tennessee Geological Survey and continued his studies at Coon Creek in 1919-20. In 1921 he joined the Transcontinental Petroleum Company in Tampico, Mexico. In 1925 he suffered from an illness which included a loss of memory. He was in Veterans Hospitals and was not in contact with colleagues for nearly 48 years. He died at Alvin York hospital in Murfreesboro, Tennessee in 1973 and was buried with family members at Oakland Cemetery, Trenton.
