= Higher National Agronomic School =

Agricultural engineering school in Algiers, Algeria

- École Nationale Supérieure Agronomique
- Other name: المدرسة الوطنية العليا للفلاحة
- Former name: National Institute of Agronomic
- Type: Public
- Established: 1905
- Chairman: Pr. Lakhdar Khelifi
- Academic staff: 170
- Undergraduates: 1,080
- Postgraduates: 429
- Doctoral students: 150
- Location: El-Harrach, Algiers Province, Algeria; 36.720866°N 3.149733°E
- Language: French – English
- Colours: green and yellow
- Website: www.ensa.dz

Higher National Agronomic School (French: École Nationale Supérieure Agronomique, Acronym: ENSA) or (Arabic: المدرسة الوطنية العليا للفلاحة), previously known as the National Institute of Agronomic (I.N.A), is the only school that trains agricultural engineers in Algeria and offers training, research and expertise, based on the specialities of the research teams: Food, Sustainable Agriculture, Biotechnology, Environment and Territories. Students have the opportunity to prepare for an Engineer's degree in Agricultural Sciences (equivalent to a master's degree). ENSA is the oldest higher education institution founded in 1905 and is located in El Harrach, Algiers.

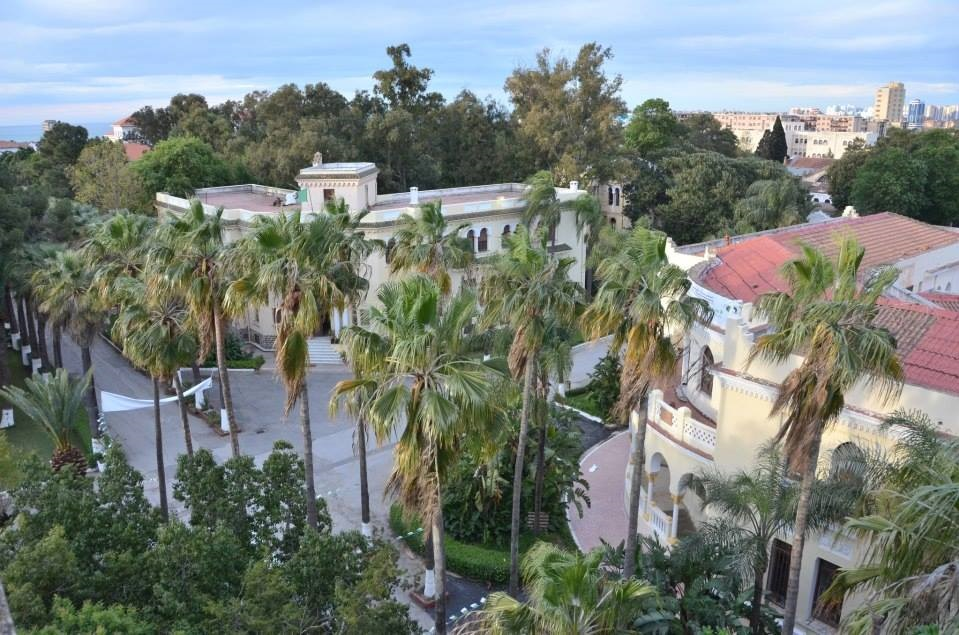
View of the Higher National Agronomic School from the top (2015)

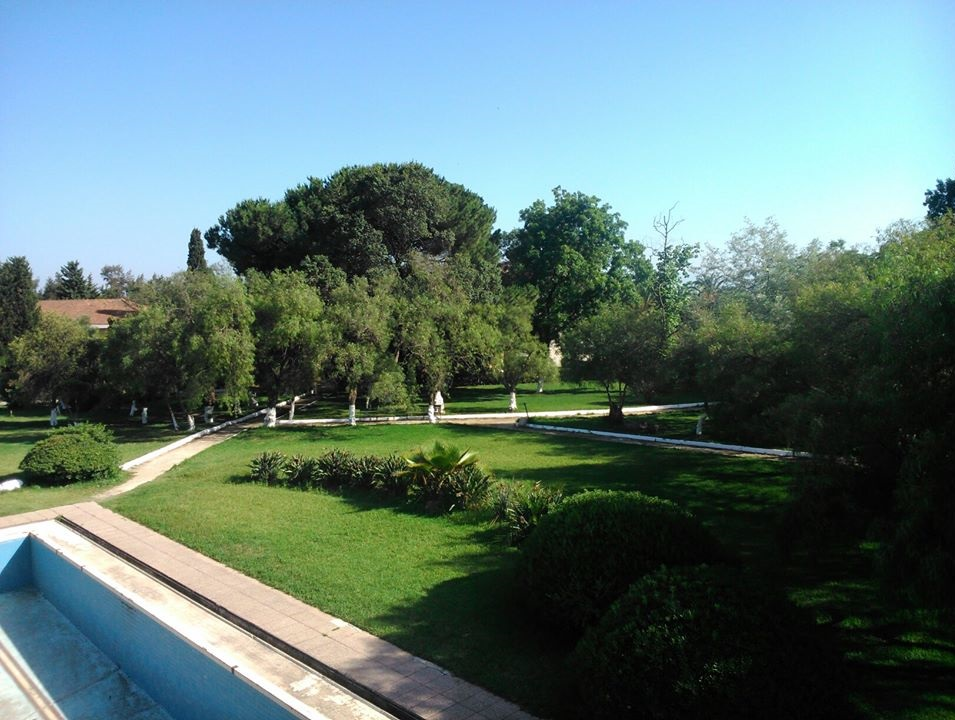
View of the Higher National Agronomic School (2015)

ENSA is officially accredited/recognized by the Ministry of Higher Education and Scientific Research in Algeria (French: Ministère de l'Enseignement Supérieur et de la Recherche Scientifique). The Higher National Agronomic School (ENSA) offers courses and programs leading to officially recognized higher education degrees such as State Engineer's degrees (French: Diplome d'Ingénieur d'État), master's degrees, doctorate degrees.

== History ==
In October 1905, under the command of M. de Peyerimhof, the school opened for the first time under the name of the Agricultural Algerian School. On 28 February 1921, the school changed its name to the Agricultural Institute in Algeria.

According to the law of 22 May 1946 establishing "Maison Carree" (currently Five houses in El Harrach) was assimilated to other metropolitan foreign operations; such as agricultural school of Montpellier, Rennes or Grignon. "The National Agriculture School of Algiers" is the new name assigned to the establishment 15 March 1947. At that stage, the selection of North African students has become increasingly severe due to common contest for schools (the same as is done in the school of Montpellier, Rennes and Grignon). The competition was quite difficult and required a wealth of knowledge of the holder of a scientific Baccalaureate degree.

In 1968, the establishment of El Harrach took a new name; that of the National Institute of Agronomic (I.N.A). Thus, the Institute had an aim to train agricultural engineers, after four years of study, to become executives in the field of agriculture and rural development. From 1977, the duration of the course of studies for obtaining the engineering degree was increased to five years. The institute became under the Ministry of Higher Education and Scientific Research (M.E.S.R.S). In 2005, the establishment saw an extension of its territory with the opening of the annex to the I.N.A.

In accordance with Executive Order 2005, the I.N.A took the current name; that of the Ecole Nationale Supérieure Agronomique (English: Higher National Agronomic School (E.N.S.A) in 2008.

== Admission ==
Students admitted in the Higher National Agronomic School must hold a Baccalaureate degree (diploma required to pursue university studies) in the following fields:

- Baccalaureate: Experimental Sciences
- Baccalaureate: Mathematics
- Baccalaureate: Mathematical and engineering

The average to access the school (E.N.S.A) is determined by the Ministry of Higher Education and Scientific Research (MESRS). The average of access is defined, later, by the MESRS, as the success rate in the national baccalaureate exam, the average of the student in Baccalaureate exam, the number of applicants and the number of vacancies in the School (E.N.S.A).

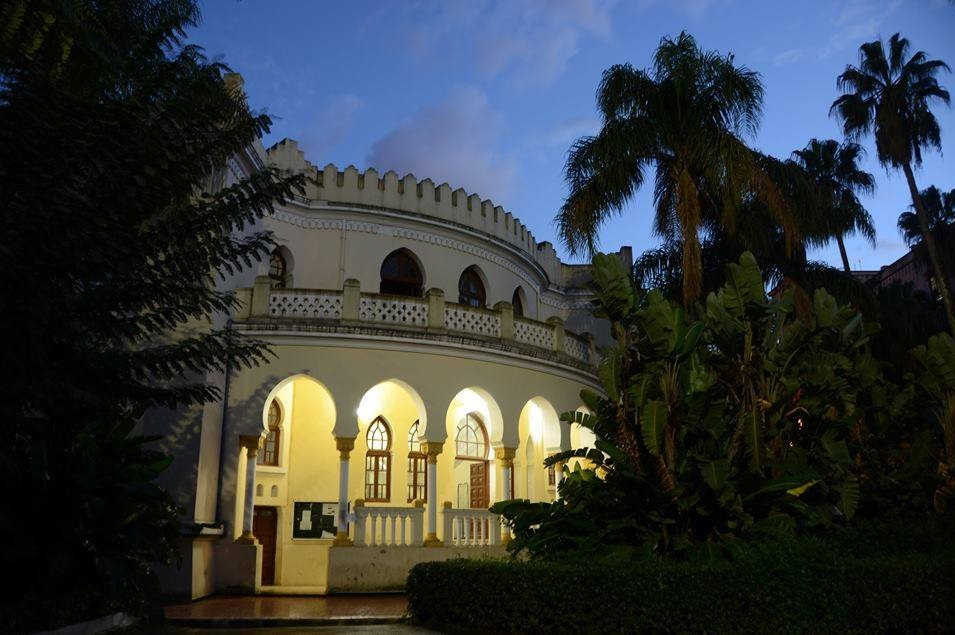
Plant Sciences Department(2015)

== Academics ==
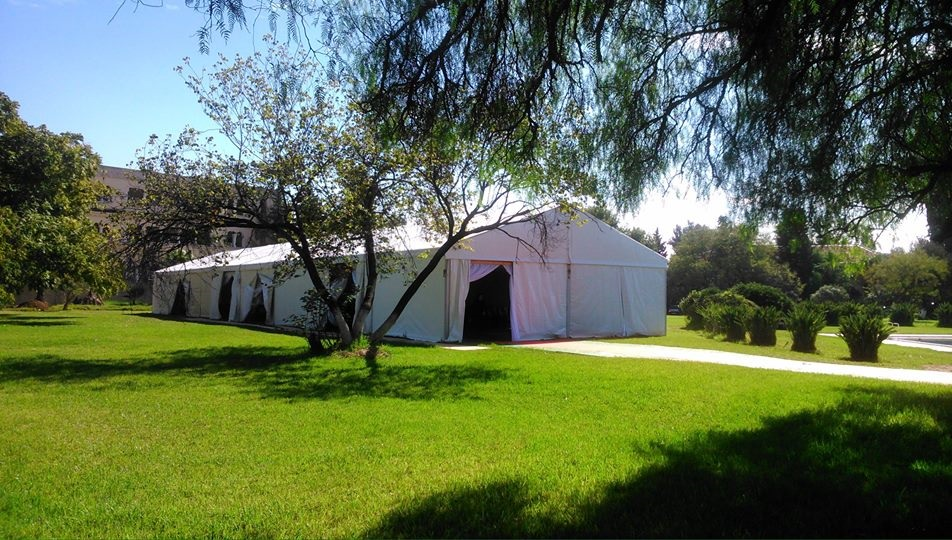
World Food Day in the Higher National Agronomic School (2015)

The Higher National Agronomic School Have an academic staff of 170 teachers and researchers (in 2012), the school aims to train State engineers' and master's degree holders specialized in different area of Agriculture after five years of study. The School includes nine departments with over fifteen specialties:

1. Department of Plant Sciences: Plant Pathology
2. Department of Rural Economics: Agribusiness Management + Agricultural economics and Rural economics
3. Department of Forestry: Forestry + Nature Protection
4. Department of Agricultural Engineering: Agricultural water + agricultural technology and agricultural machinery
5. Department of Soil Science: Soil Sciences
6. Department of Food Technology: food industries + Technology and Human Nutrition
7. Department of Animal Science: Animal Production
8. Department of Plant Production Science: Plant Production
9. Department of Agricultural and Forest Zoology: Plant Protection + Agricultural and Forest Entomology

== Curriculum ==
Five years of study are required for the State engineering degree, three years of common core studies related to different agricultural sciences, and two years of specialized studies ("majors"). Students can follow their studies accordingly to their desired departments.

First to third year

The curriculum begins with multidisciplinary courses which are all required courses, there is no elective courses.

Students are expected to do various kinds of work for a course:

- Attending course sessions.
- Reading and studying course readings assigned in the course syllabus.
- Discussing material they have read.
- Writing short and long papers based on assigned reading and their own library research.
- Completing homework or problem sets.
- Completing laboratory exercises.
- Taking quizzes and examinations.

Fourth and fifth year

In the fourth Year, students have to choose one of the specialized departments in the school (major), which focuses on a discipline or sometimes an interdisciplinary subject. The Fifth year is ended by a research internship (6 to 10 Months).

In Algeria State Engineering Degree "French: diplôme d'Ingénieur d'Etat" is also the equivalent of a master's degree, the diploma is recognized by a committee of evaluation and accreditation of higher education institutions in the field of engineering in order to authorize Algerian écoles Nationale Supérieure (English: Higher National Schools) to deliver the State Engineering Degree "French: diplôme d'Ingénieur d'Etat", for the development of quality in engineering education, and the promotion of engineering curricula and careers in Algeria and abroad.

The Holders of the State Engineering's Degree (5 years) have a possibility to obtain a master's degree beside the State Engineering degree as they are equivalent degrees after taking the additional in-depth program which is proceed in duration of 200 hours minimum. The lessons are organized in courses. Each course is associated to a coefficient or credits.

The Holders of the master's degree of the Higher National Agronomic School can apply to pursue their studies in Doctoral degree (Licence Master Doctorat).

== Grading system ==
The school's grading scale typically ranges from 0 (worst) to 20 (best).

The grade of 10/20 is sufficient for validation of the courses.

The overall annual average of 10/20 is sufficient for passing to the next year even conceding grades below 10/20. Unless, conceding grades below 5/20 which means that the student have to re-take courses below 5/20 in order to validate and get acceptance in the School years' curriculum, even if the overall annual average is 10/20.

Scale	Grade Description	US Grade	Notes
15.00 – 20.00	(Very Good)	A+	
13.00 – 14.99	(Good)	A	
12.00 – 12.99	(Fairly Good)	B+	
11.00 – 11.99	(Satisfactory)	B	
10.00 – 10.99	(Sufficient)	C	
0.00 – 9.99	(Insufficient)	F	A conceded pass may be awarded for grades below 10.0 when the overall average for the year is 10.0 or above

== Ranking ==
In 2016, according to ranking web of universities, the Higher National Agronomic School (Ecole Nationale supeieure Agronomique) is on the 38th national rank. It is in the 2nd place as an agricultural specialized school in north Africa region and 119th in all north Africa region universities. ENSA has a rank of 265 among universities in Arabic countries.

Country Rank	North Africa Rank	Arabic Countries Rank
38	119	265

== See also ==
- List of colleges and universities
- List of universities in Algeria
