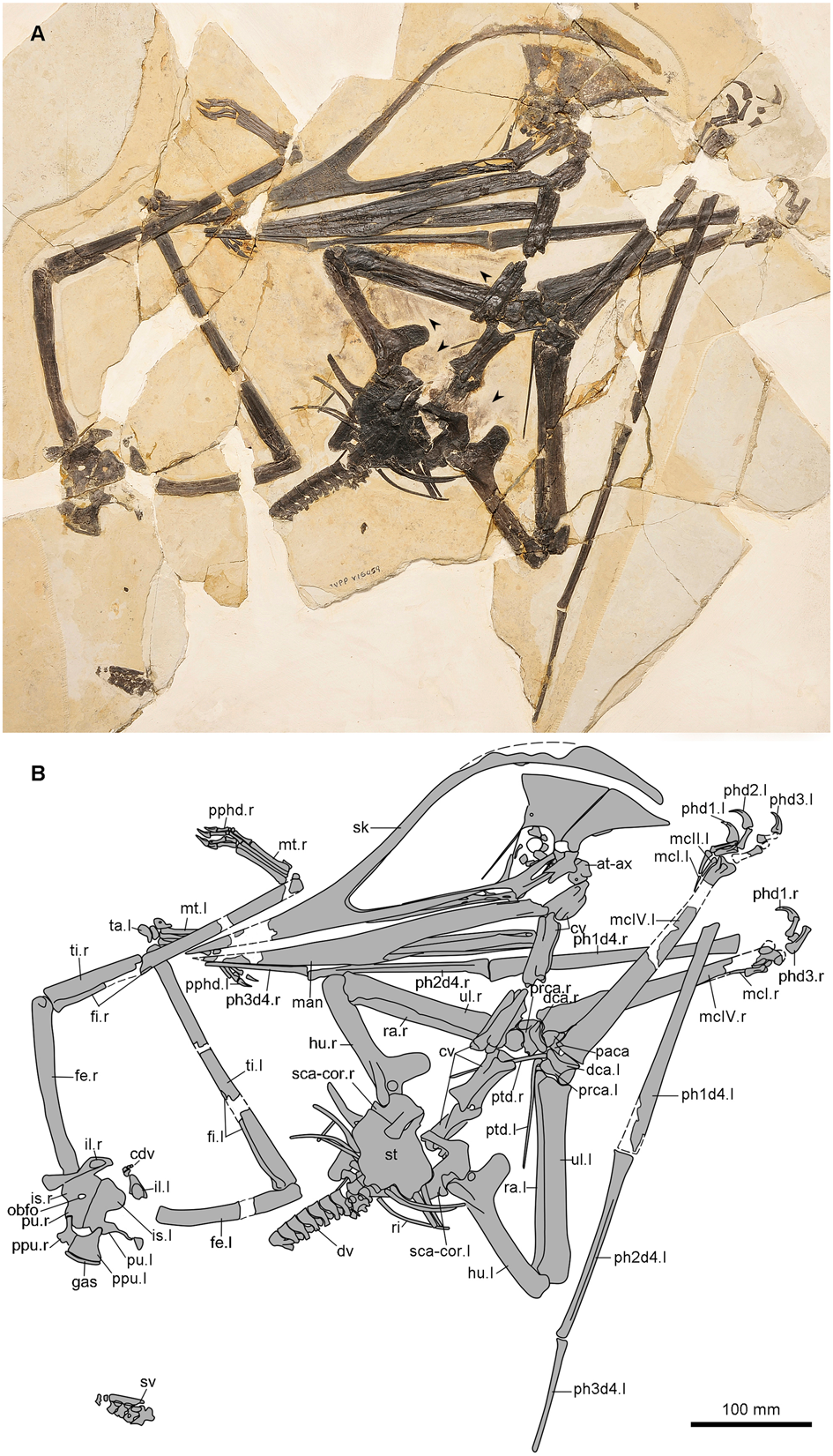
- Photograph (top) and line drawing (bottom) of the M. youhao holotype

Scientific classification
- Kingdom: Animalia
- Phylum: Chordata
- Class: Reptilia
- Order: †Pterosauria
- Suborder: †Pterodactyloidea
- Clade: †Azhdarchoidea
- Family: †Chaoyangopteridae
- Subfamily: †Shenzhoupterinae
- Genus: †Meilifeilong; Wang et al., 2023

Type species
- †Meilifeilong youhao Wang et al., 2023

Other species
- †Meilifeilong sanyainus (Ji et al., 2023)

= Meilifeilong =

Meilifeilong Temporal range: Early Cretaceous, Barremian–Aptian

Genus of chaoyangopterid pterosaurs

Meilifeilong (lit. 'beautiful flying dragon') is an extinct genus of chaoyangopterid pterosaurs from the Early Cretaceous Jiufotang Formation of China. The genus contains two species. The type species, M. youhao, was described in 2023 based on an almost complete skeleton and a partial isolated skull. The second species, M. sanyainus, was described earlier in 2023 as a species of Shenzhoupterus, based on a complete skull and skeleton. Meilifeilong is the best-preserved and most complete chaoyangopterid currently known.

== Discovery and naming ==
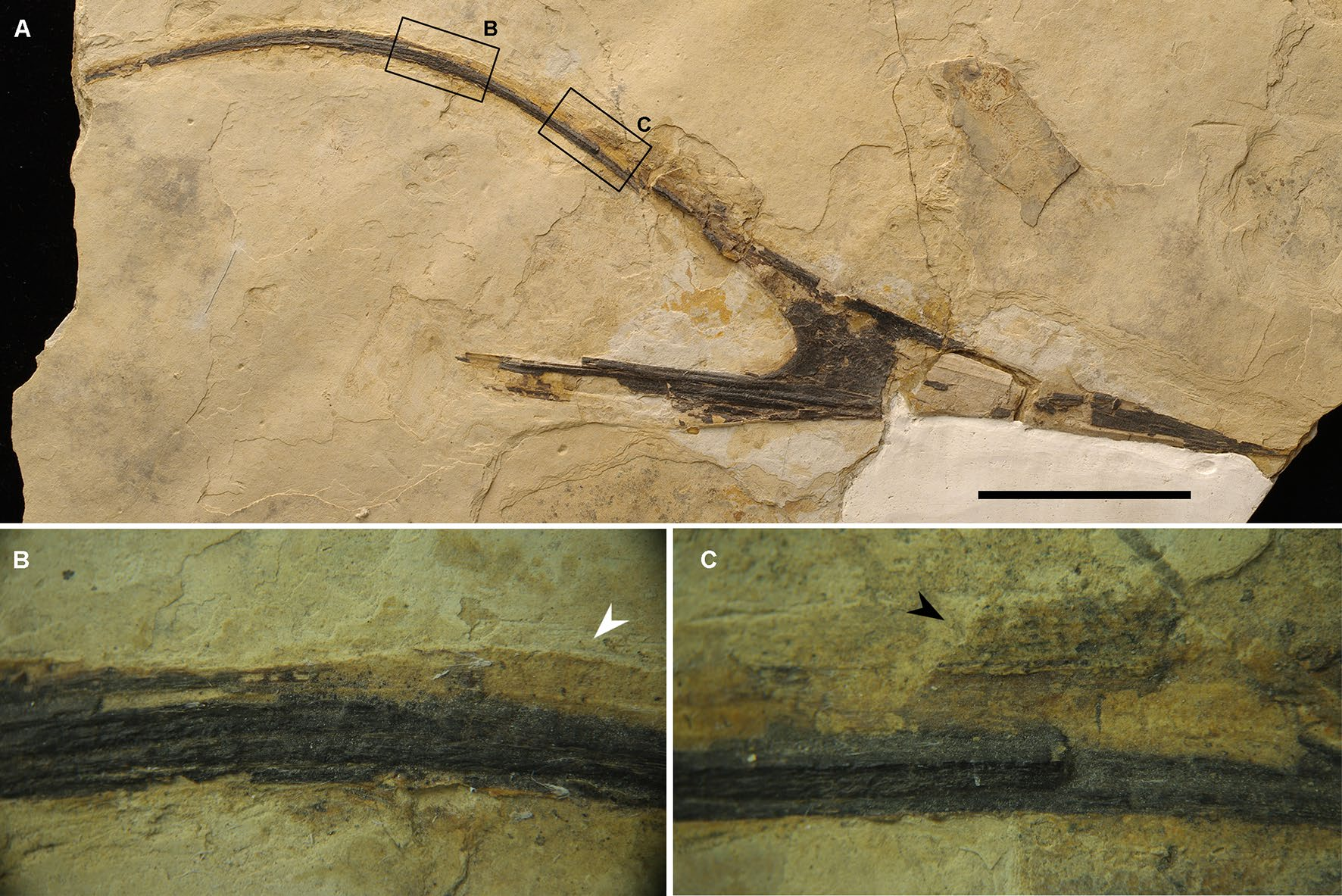
IVPP V 17955, a partial skull referred to M. youhao

All described fossil remains of Meilifeilong were discovered in the Xiaotaizi fossil layer, part of the Jiufotang Formation (Jianchang Basin) in Jianchang County of Liaoning Province, China.

In December 2023, Xiaolin Wang and colleagues described Meilifeilong youhao as a new genus and species of chaoyangopterid pterosaur based on two specimens from the Jiufotang Formation. IVPP V 16059, a nearly complete skeleton and the skull, missing the tail, was established as the holotype specimen. IVPP V 17955, a partial skull comprising the premaxillae, maxillae, and partial palatines of a smaller individual, was also referred to this species. The generic name, Meilifeilong, combines the Chinese words meili, meaning 'beautiful', fei, meaning 'fly', and long, meaning 'dragon', referencing the incredible preservational quality of the holotype. The specific name youhao means 'friendship' in Mandarin, referencing the two decades up to that point of collaboration between Chinese and Brazilian scientists on pterosaur research.

In May 2023, while the work of Wang and colleagues was in review for publication in a scientific journal, Ji and colleagues described specimen DB0233, a nearly complete chaoyangopterid skull and skeleton from the Jiufotang Formation. The authors interpreted the remains as belonging to a new species of Shenzhoupterus, which they named Shenzhoupterus sanyainus. The specific name, sanyainus, references the Sanya Dinosaur Fossil Museum, where DB0233 is accessioned.

Based on shared characters between the M. youhao and S. sanyainus holotypes, including a low, posteriorly-extending premaxillary crest and a humerus ~20% longer than wing phalanx III, Wang and colleagues transferred S. sanyainus to their new genus Meilifeilong, creating the new combination M. sanyainus.

== Description ==
The holotype specimens of both Meilifeilong species are nearly the same size; the M. youhao holotype has a wingspan of approximately 2.16 metres (7.1 ft), while the M. sanyainus holotype has a wingspan between 2.05 and 2.18 m (6.7 and 7.2 ft). Notably, several elements in the M. sanyainus holotype are unfused, indicating it was not as skeletally mature as the M. youhao holotype and could have grown larger.

Several anatomical features distinguish the two Meilifeilong species. In M. youhao, the posterior process of the premaxilla (portion forming the back of the crest) is more arched, the angle of the lacrimal and postorbital processes of the jugal is more narrow, at about 45°, the mandibular symphysis is deeper, the fifth cervical (neck) vertebra is longer than the fourth, the sternum is rectangular, the scapula is longer than the coracoid, and metatarsals III and IV are markedly shorter than I and II. In comparison, in M. sanyainus, the posterior process of the premaxilla is shallower, the angle of the lacrimal and postorbital processes of the jugal is wider, at about 55°, the mandibular symphysis is shallower, the fourth cervical is longer than the fifth, the sternum is square, the coracoid is longer than the scapula, and there is a smaller difference in size between the metatarsals.

== Classification ==
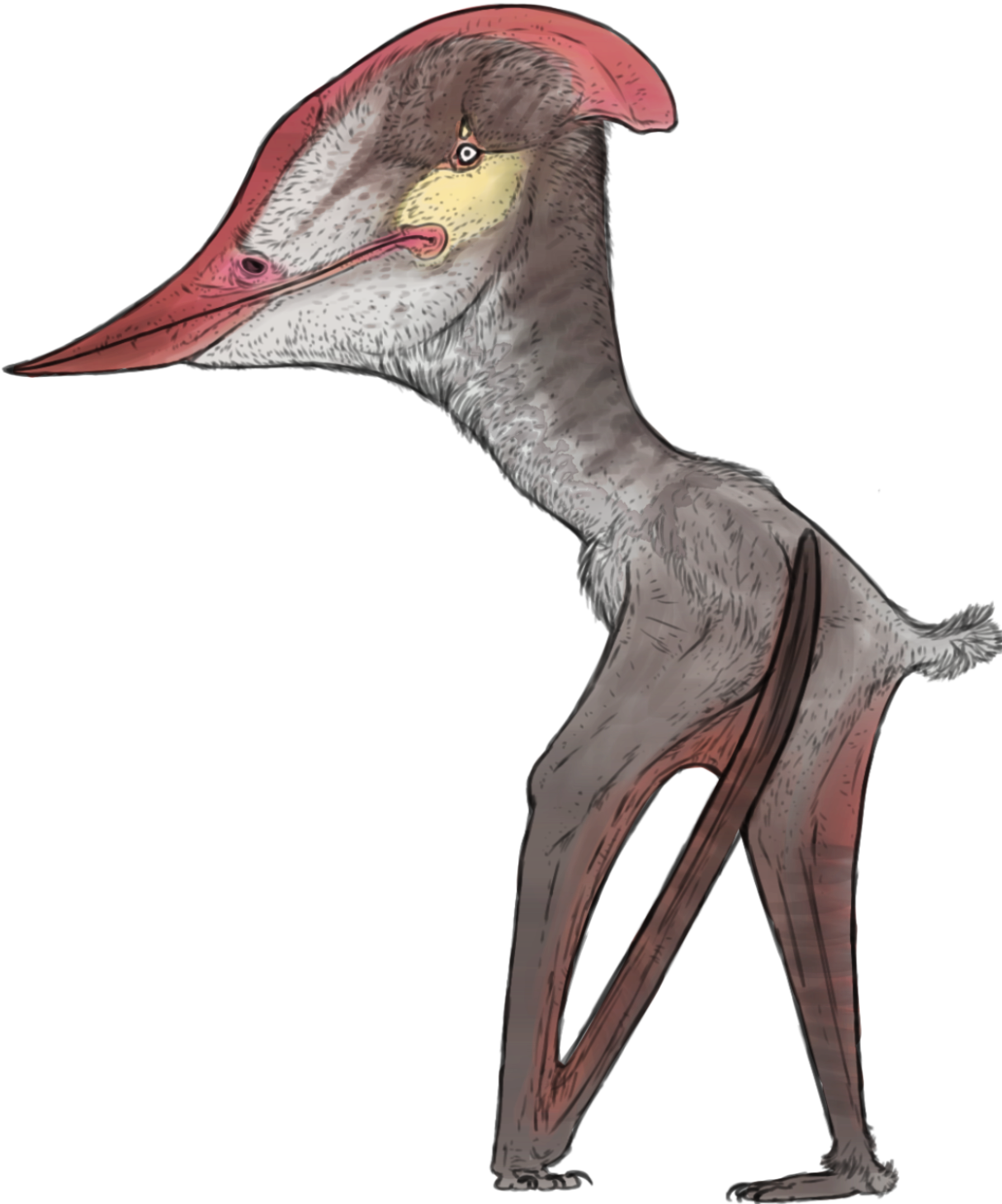
Life restoration of M. youhao

While neither Wang et al. nor Ji et al. performed phylogenetic analyses to test the relationships of the species described in their 2023 publications, both placed the specimens within the azhdarchoid family Chaoyangopteridae based on observed synapomorphies (shared traits). These include the comparatively large skull without teeth, the presence of a narrow, pointed snout, a slender premaxillary dorsal process that extends to the posterior end of the skull, a long and straight ventral margin of the skull and dorsal margin of the mandible, a particularly large nasoantorbital fenestra, and pear-shaped orbits.

In 2025, Thomas and McDavid published the results of a comprehensive, azhdarchoid-focused phylogenetic analysis of pterosaurs. They included both Meilifeilong species, which were recovered in a clade sister to Shenzhoupterus, also including Eoazhdarcho. This clade was given the new name Shenzhoupterinae. The sister group to Shenzhoupterinae contains Apatorhamphus, Ornithostoma, and the newly-named Chaoyangopterinae. These results are displayed in the cladogram below:

- Azhdarchoidea
  - Tapejaromorpha
  - Azhdarchomorpha
    - Inabtanin alarabia
    - Microtuban altivolans
    - - RGM.631745
      - Concilazhia
        - Chaoyangopteridae
          - Shenzhoupterinae
            - Eoazhdarcho liaoxiensis
            - - Shenzhoupterus chaoyangensis
              - - Meilifeilong sanyainus
                - Meilifeilong youhao
          - - - Apatorhamphus gyrostega
              - Ornithostoma sedgwicki
            - Chaoyangopterinae
              - - Chaoyangopterus zhangi
                - UFC 721
              - - Jidapterus edentus
                - Lacusovagus magnificens
        - Azhdarchiformes
          - Alanqidae
          - - - Montanazhdarcho minor
              - Radiodactylus langstoni
            - - Azhdarchidae

== Paleoenvironment ==
The fossils of both Meilifeilong species were discovered in layers of the Jiufotang Formation, which dates to the Barremian–Aptian ages of the Early Cretaceous. Many other pterosaurs, including additional chaoyangopterids, are also known from this formation. Well-preserved fossils of many other animals, including non-avian dinosaurs, early birds, mammals, turtles, lizards, and fish, have also been found here.
