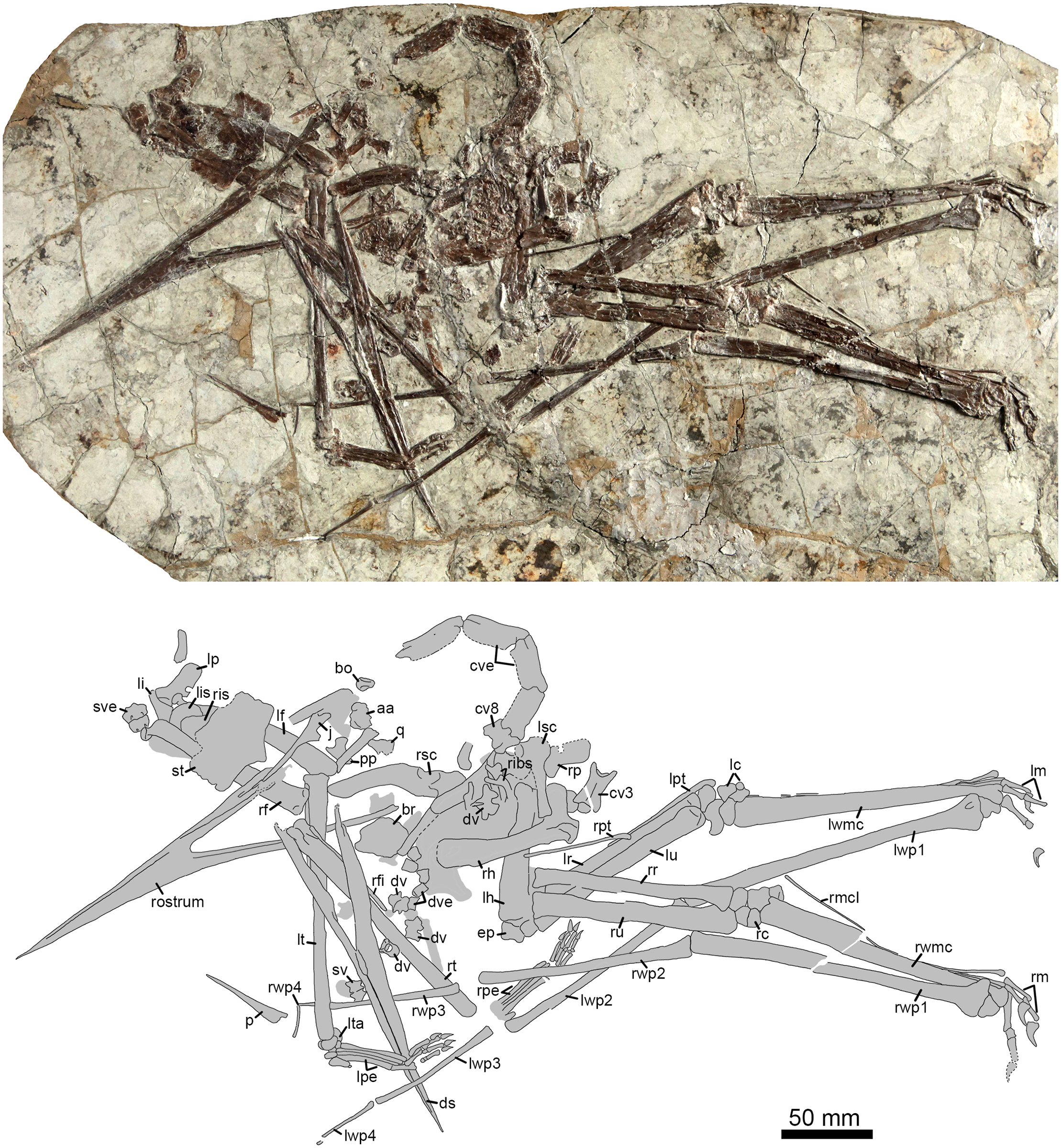
- Holotype specimen of Jidapterus

Scientific classification
- Kingdom: Animalia
- Phylum: Chordata
- Class: Reptilia
- Order: †Pterosauria
- Suborder: †Pterodactyloidea
- Clade: †Azhdarchoidea
- Clade: †Concilazhia
- Family: †Chaoyangopteridae; Lü et al., 2008

Type species
- †Chaoyangopterus zhangi Wang & Zhou, 2003

Genera
- †Apatorhamphus?; †Argentinadraco?; †Lacusovagus?; †Microtuban?; †Ornithostoma?; †Xericeps?; †Chaoyangopterinae; †Chaoyangopterus; †Jidapterus; †Shenzhoupterinae; †Shenzhoupterus; †Eoazhdarcho?; †Meilifeilong

= Chaoyangopteridae =

Chaoyangopterids Temporal range: Early Cretaceous, 125–120 Ma Possible Late Cretaceous record

Family of azhdarchoid pterosaurs

Chaoyangopteridae (or chaoyangopterids) is a family of pterosaurs within the larger group Azhdarchoidea. Chaoyangopterids lived mostly during the Early Cretaceous period, though possible members, Microtuban, Xericeps and Argentinadraco, may extend the fossil range to the Late Cretaceous.

== History ==
The clade Chaoyangopteridae was first defined in 2008 by Lü Junchang and David Unwin as: "Chaoyangopterus, Shenzhoupterus, their most recent common ancestor and all taxa more closely related to this clade than to Tapejara, Tupuxuara or Quetzalcoatlus". Based on neck and limb proportions, it has been suggested they occupied a similar ecological niche to that of azhdarchid pterosaurs, though it is possible they were more specialized as several genera occur in Liaoning, while azhdarchids usually occur by one genus in a specific location.

== Description ==
Chaoyangopterids are distinguished from other pterosaurs by several traits of the nasoantorbital fenestra, a large hole on the side of the snout formed by the assimilation of the nares (nostril holes) into the antorbital fenestra. In members of this family, the nasoantorbital fenestra is massive, with the rear edge extending as far back as the braincase and jaw joint. The front edge is formed by a rod of bone known as the premaxillary bar, which is unusually slender in members of this family.

== Classification ==
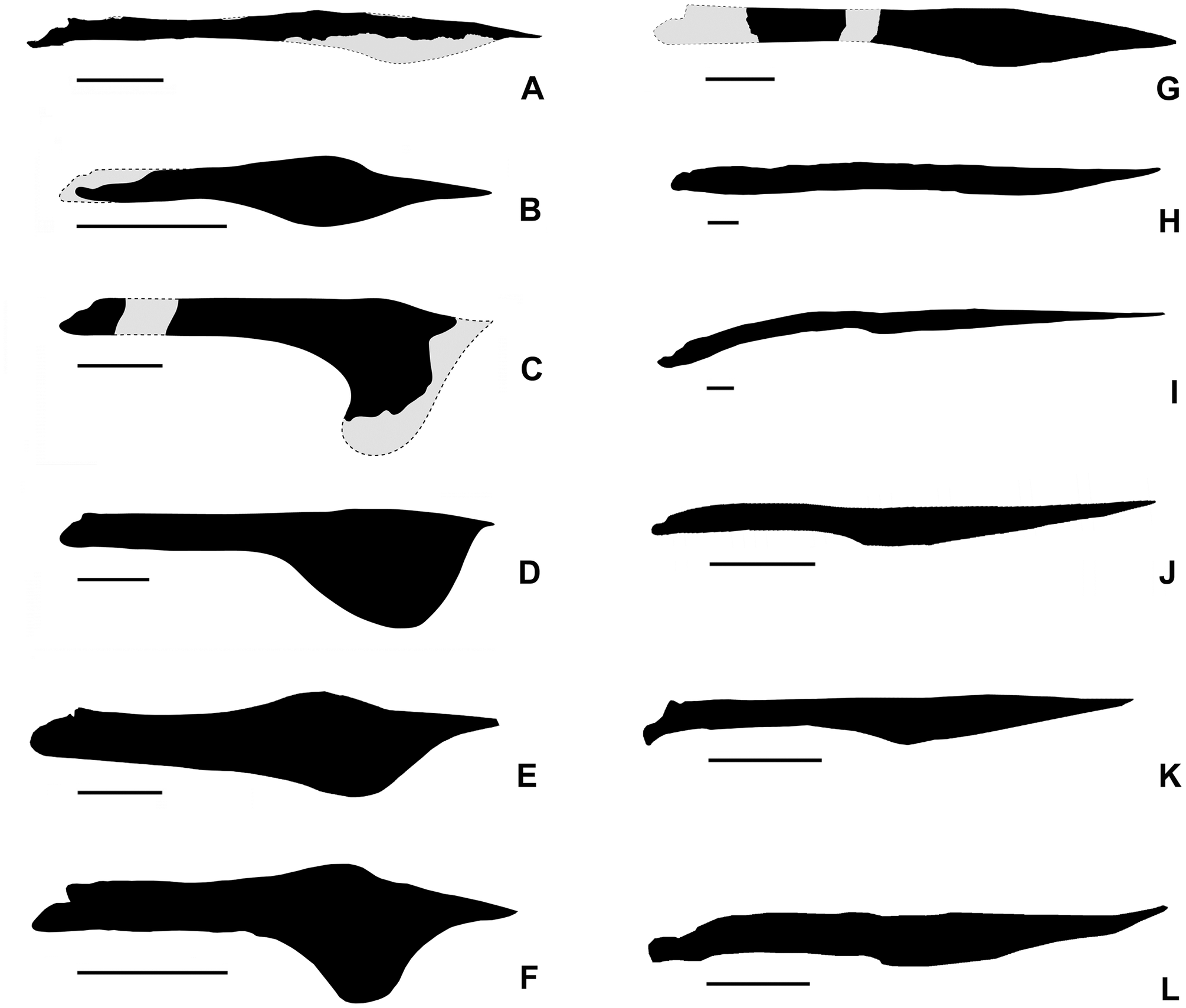
Comparison of azhdarchoid mandibles, notice the chaoyangopterids Shenzhoupterus (K) and Chaoyangopterus (L)

Below is a cladogram showing the phylogenetic analysis conducted by paleontologist Brian Andres and colleagues in 2014. In the analysis, Chaoyangopteridae was found to consist of the genus Eoazhdarcho and the subfamily Chaoyangopterinae. The subfamily Chaoyangopterinae was initially used by paleontologist Felipe Pinheiro and colleagues in 2011, which they assigned to the family Tapejaridae, however, Andres and colleagues redefined the subfamily as the least inclusive clade containing Chaoyangopterus zhangi and Shenzhoupterus chaoyangensis. In the analysis by Andres and colleagues, Chaoyangopterinae consisted of the pterosaurs Chaoyangopterus, Shenzhoupterus, and Jidapterus.

- Neoazhdarchia
  - Chaoyangopteridae
    - - - Chaoyangopterus zhangi
        - Jidapterus edentus
      - Shenzhoupterus chaoyangensis
    - Eoazhdarcho liaoxiensis
  - Azhdarchidae
    - Azhdarcho lancicollis
    - - Zhejiangopterus linhaiensis
      - - Arambourgiania philadelphiae
        - Quetzalcoatlus northropi

A 2021 study focused on Aerotitan recovers Xericeps and Argentinadraco as sister taxa within Chaoyangopteridae.

- Chaoyangopteridae
  - Shenzhoupterus chaoyangensis
  - - - Xericeps curvirostris
      - Argentinadraco barrealensis
    - - Chaoyangopterus zhangi
      - Jidapterus edentus
      - Lacusovagus magnificens

== Paleobiology ==
=== Diet ===
Like their azhdarchid relatives, pterosaurs that belong to the Chaoyangopteridae were terrestrial predators.

== Paleoecology ==
The members of the family Chaoyangopteridae are mostly known from Asia, though the possible member Lacusovagus occurs in South America and there are possible fossil remains from Africa, including the possible member Apatorhamphus. Microtuban may extend the clade's existence into the early Late Cretaceous.
