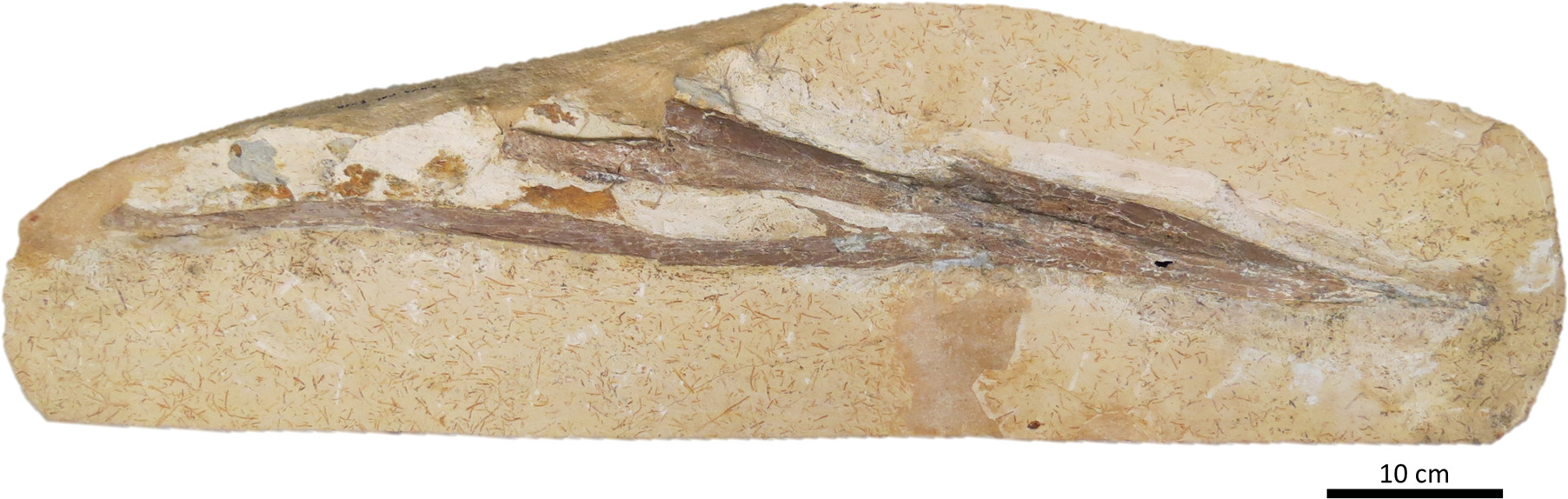
- Holotype specimen

Scientific classification
- Kingdom: Animalia
- Phylum: Chordata
- Class: Reptilia
- Order: †Pterosauria
- Suborder: †Pterodactyloidea
- Clade: †Azhdarchoidea
- Clade: †Concilazhia
- Family: †Chaoyangopteridae (?)
- Genus: †Lacusovagus; Witton, 2008
- Species: †L. magnificens

Binomial name
- †Lacusovagus magnificens Witton, 2008

= Lacusovagus =

Lacusovagus Temporal range: Early Cretaceous, 120 Ma

Genus of azhdarchoid pterosaur from the Early Cretaceous

Lacusovagus (meaning "lake wanderer") is a genus of azhdarchoid pterodactyloid pterosaur from the Lower Cretaceous of Brazil.

== Discovery and naming ==
It is based on SMNK PAL 4325, a partial upper jaw comprising sections of the skull in front of the eyes. This specimen was found in rocks of the Early Cretaceous-age (probably Aptian stage, about 120 to 93 million years ago) Nova Olinda Member of the Crato Formation.

== Description ==
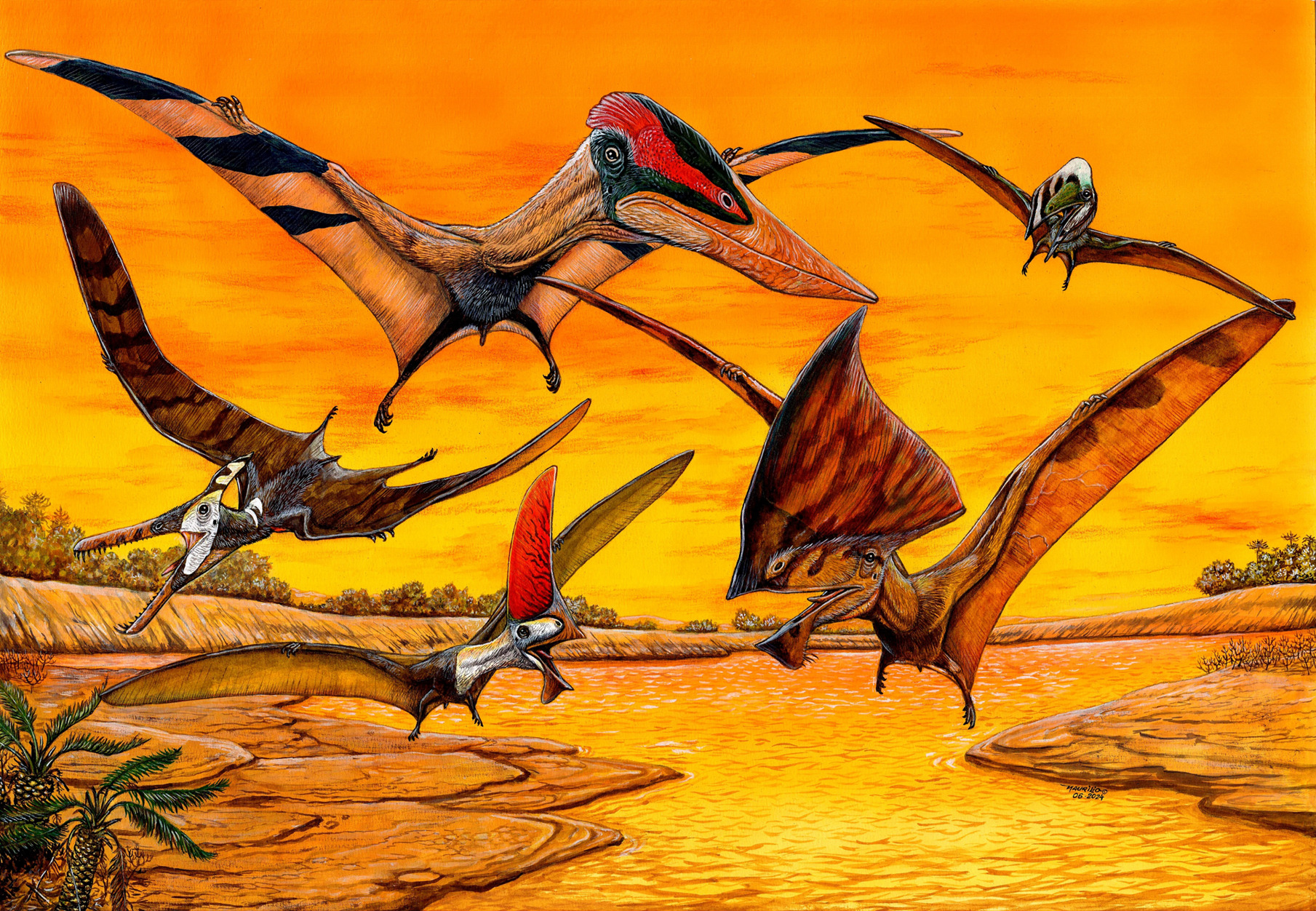
Life restorations of Lacusovagus (upper left) and other pterosaurs known from the Crato Formation

The skull was long, and unusually wide. The section in front of the combined nasal-antorbital fenestra was relatively short. Also unusual was the combination of its toothless jaws and no bony head crest. Lacusovagus was described in 2008 by Mark Witton. The type species is L. magnificens, meaning "grand lake wanderer", in reference to its large size—it is currently the largest pterosaur known from the Crato Formation with an estimated wingspan of approximately 4 metres (13 ft) and a body mass of 30 kg (66 lb).

== Classification ==
Lacusovagus shares many characteristics with the basal azhdarchoid family Chaoyangopteridae. Preliminary studies suggested it was a member of that clade, and a position within Chaoyangopteridae has been supported by numerous subsequent studies. However, alternative phylogenetic analyses have recovered it within the genus Tupuxuara, a member of the Thalassodromidae, or within Tapejaridae.

== See also ==
- List of pterosaur genera
- Timeline of pterosaur research
- Pterosaur size
