= Chaoyangopterus =

Chaoyangopterus Temporal range: Early Cretaceous, 120 Ma
- C. zhangi, Chaoyang Paleontological Museum

Scientific classification
- Kingdom: Animalia
- Phylum: Chordata
- Class: Reptilia
- Order: †Pterosauria
- Suborder: †Pterodactyloidea
- Clade: †Azhdarchoidea
- Family: †Chaoyangopteridae
- Subfamily: †Chaoyangopterinae
- Genus: †Chaoyangopterus; Wang & Zhou, 2003
- Species: †C. zhangi

Binomial name
- †Chaoyangopterus zhangi Wang & Zhou, 2003

Genus of chaoyangopterid pterosaur from the Early Cretaceous

Chaoyangopterus is a genus of chaoyangopterid pterosaur known from a partial skeleton found in Liaoning, China. Chaoyangopterus was found in rocks dating back to the Aptian-age Lower Cretaceous Jiufotang Formation of Dapingfang, Chaoyang.

== Etymology ==
Chaoyangopterus was named and described in 2003 by Wang Xiaolin and Zhou Zhonghe. The type species is Chaoyangopterus zhangi. The genus name is derived from Chaoyang and a Latinized Greek pteron, "wing". The specific name honors journalist Zhang Wanlian for his efforts in protecting fossil sites.

== Description ==
Chaoyangopterus is based on holotype IVPP V13397, which includes the front of the skull, the lower jaws, the neck vertebrae, the shoulder and pelvic girdles, and the limbs. The skull is about 270 millimetres (11 inches) long and toothless, and its wingspan is estimated to have been around 1.85 meters (6.1 feet). Wang and Zhou concluded that it compared most closely to Nyctosaurus and classified it as a nyctosaurid, although they found that its shin was proportionally longer compared to the femur and humerus in Chaoyangopterus, that their animal had relatively shorter wings and longer legs than Nyctosaurus, and that it still had four fingers.

== Classification ==
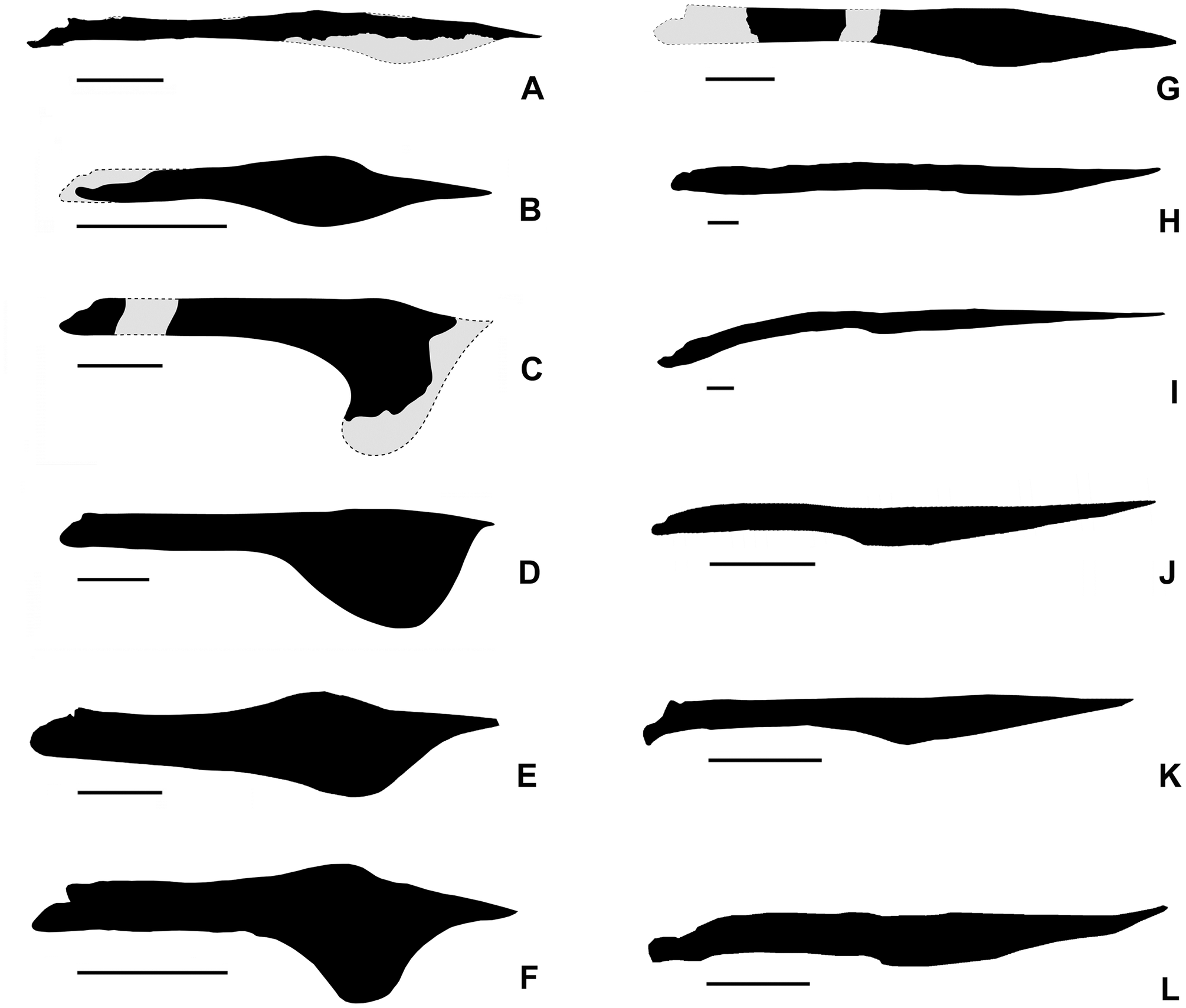
Comparison of azhdarchoid mandibles, notice Chaoyangopterus (L)

The classification of Chaoyangopterus has since become unsettled, with subsequent reviewers disagreeing with the nyctosaurid assessment. David Unwin, in a popular work, included it without comment with the tapejarid family of azhdarchoid pterosaurs, known for their large head crests. A detailed phylogenetic analysis of Liaoning pterosaurs published by Lü Junchang and Ji Qiang in 2006 found it instead to be a basal azhdarchoid of no particular familial affiliation. However, subsequent analysis by Lü and Unwin found that within the Azhdarchoidea it formed a clade with several other forms such as Jidapterus and Shenzhoupterus, which they named Chaoyangopteridae.

Wang and Zhou, however, stated in 2006 that Chaoyangopterus was a member of the Pteranodontidae and that Jidapterus, Eoazhdarcho and Eopteranodon are subjective junior synonyms of the former. This interpretation was not supported by a 2017 redescription of Jidapterus, which was able to reliably distinguish all of these genera.

Below are two cladograms showing the phylogenetic placement of Chaoyangopterus within the Azhdarchoidea. The one on the left is a topology by Felipe Pinheiro and colleagues in 2011, they recovered Chaoyangopterus within the family Tapejaridae, more specifically within a subfamily called Chaoyangopterinae, sister taxon to both Jidapterus and Shenzhoupterus. The cladogram on the right is a different topology, recovered by Alexander Kellner and colleagues in 2019. Unlike the analysis by Pinheiro and colleagues, the analysis by Kellner and colleagues did not recover Chaoyangopterus as a tapejarid, but instead recovered it within the family Chaoyangopteridae, still the sister taxon to both Jidapterus and Shenzhoupterus, though. Chaoyangopteridae in turn was found as the sister taxon of the family Azhdarchidae, both within the clade Azhdarchoidea.

Topology 1: Pinheiro and colleagues (2011).

- Tapejaridae
  - Thalassodrominae
    - Thalassodromeus
    - Tupuxuara
  - - Chaoyangopterinae
      - Jidapterus
      - Shenzhoupterus
      - Chaoyangopterus
    - Tapejarinae
      - Sinopterus
      - - Huaxiapterus
        - - Tapejara
          - Tupandactylus

Topology 2: Kellner and colleagues (2019).

- Azhdarchoidea
  - - Azhdarchidae
      - Azhdarcho
      - Quetzalcoatlus
      - Zhejiangopterus
    - Chaoyangopteridae
      - Chaoyangopterus
      - Jidapterus
      - Shenzhoupterus
  - Tapejaromorpha
    - Keresdrakon
    - Tapejaridae
      - Thalassodrominae
      - Tapejarinae

== Paleobiology ==
Chaoyangopterus is known to have been a toothless pterosaur and was assumed by Wang to have been a piscivore or fish-eater, but other relevant details of its paleobiology will have to await a more detailed description. Chaoyangopterids in general are now thought to have been similar to azhdarchid pterosaurs, implying that they were probably crane-like terrestrial omnivores and opportunistic carnivores.

== See also ==
- List of pterosaur genera
- Timeline of pterosaur research
