= Antorbital fenestra =

Opening in the skull in front of the eye sockets, largely associated with archosauriforms

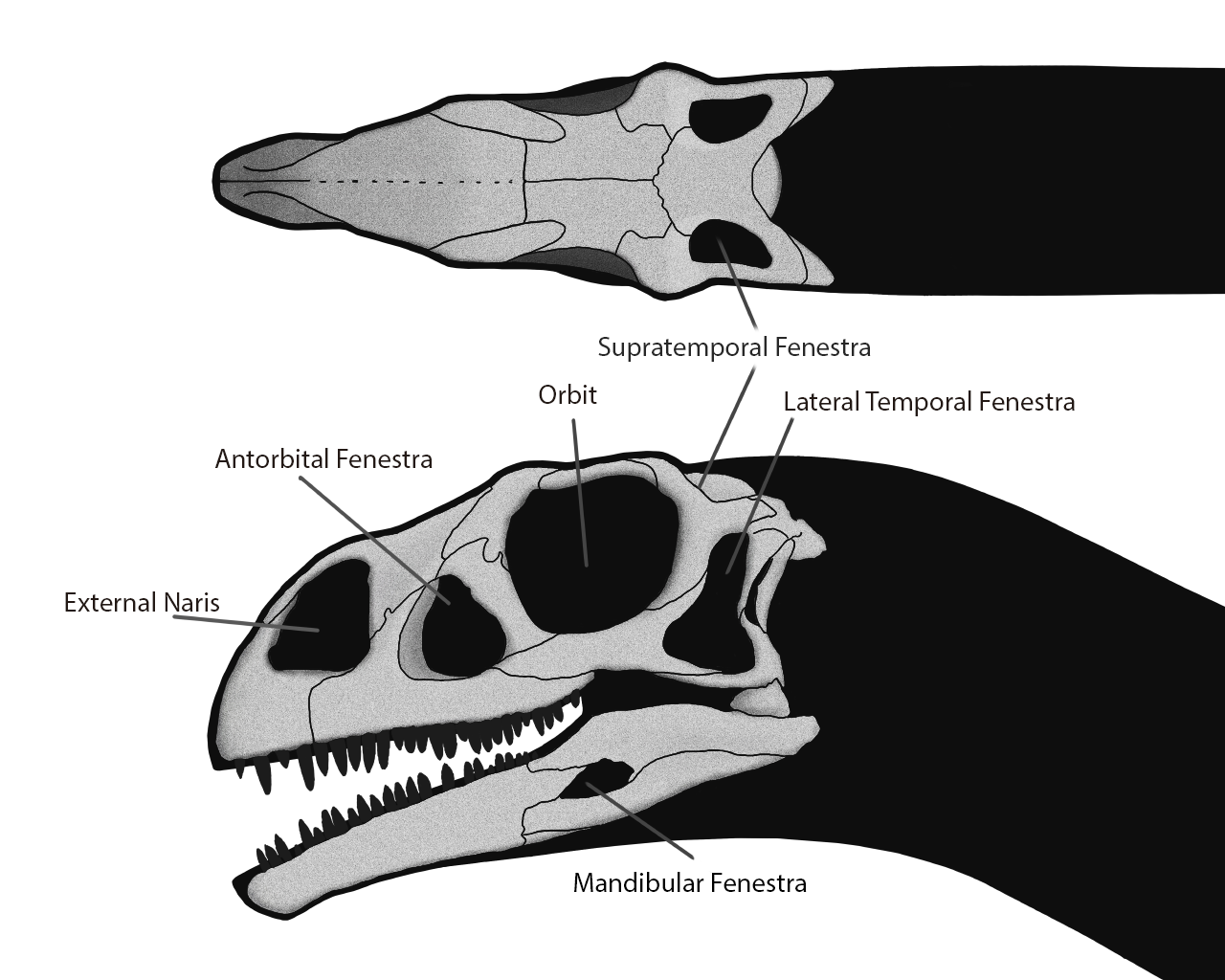
The antorbital fenestra in relation to the other skull openings in the dinosaur Massospondylus.

Side view of Common raven cranium showing the antorbital fenestra between the orbit and the nasal opening

An antorbital fenestra (plural: fenestrae) is an opening in the skull that is in front of the eye sockets. This skull character is largely associated with archosauriforms, first appearing during the Triassic Period. Among extant archosaurs, birds still possess antorbital fenestrae, whereas crocodylians have lost them. The loss in crocodylians is believed to be related to the structural needs of their skulls for the bite force and feeding behaviours that they employ. In some archosaur species, the opening has closed but its location is still marked by a depression, or fossa, on the surface of the skull called the antorbital fossa.

The antorbital fenestra houses a paranasal sinus that is confluent with the adjacent nasal capsule. Although crocodylians walled over their antorbital fenestra, they still retain an antorbital sinus.

In theropod dinosaurs, the antorbital fenestra is the largest opening in the skull. Systematically, the presence of the antorbital fenestra is considered a synapomorphy that unites tetanuran theropods as a clade. In contrast, most ornithischian dinosaurs reduce and even close their antorbital fenestrae such as in hadrosaurs and the dinosaur genus Protoceratops. This closure distinguishes Protoceratops from other ceratopsian dinosaurs.

== See also ==
- Fenestra (anatomy)
