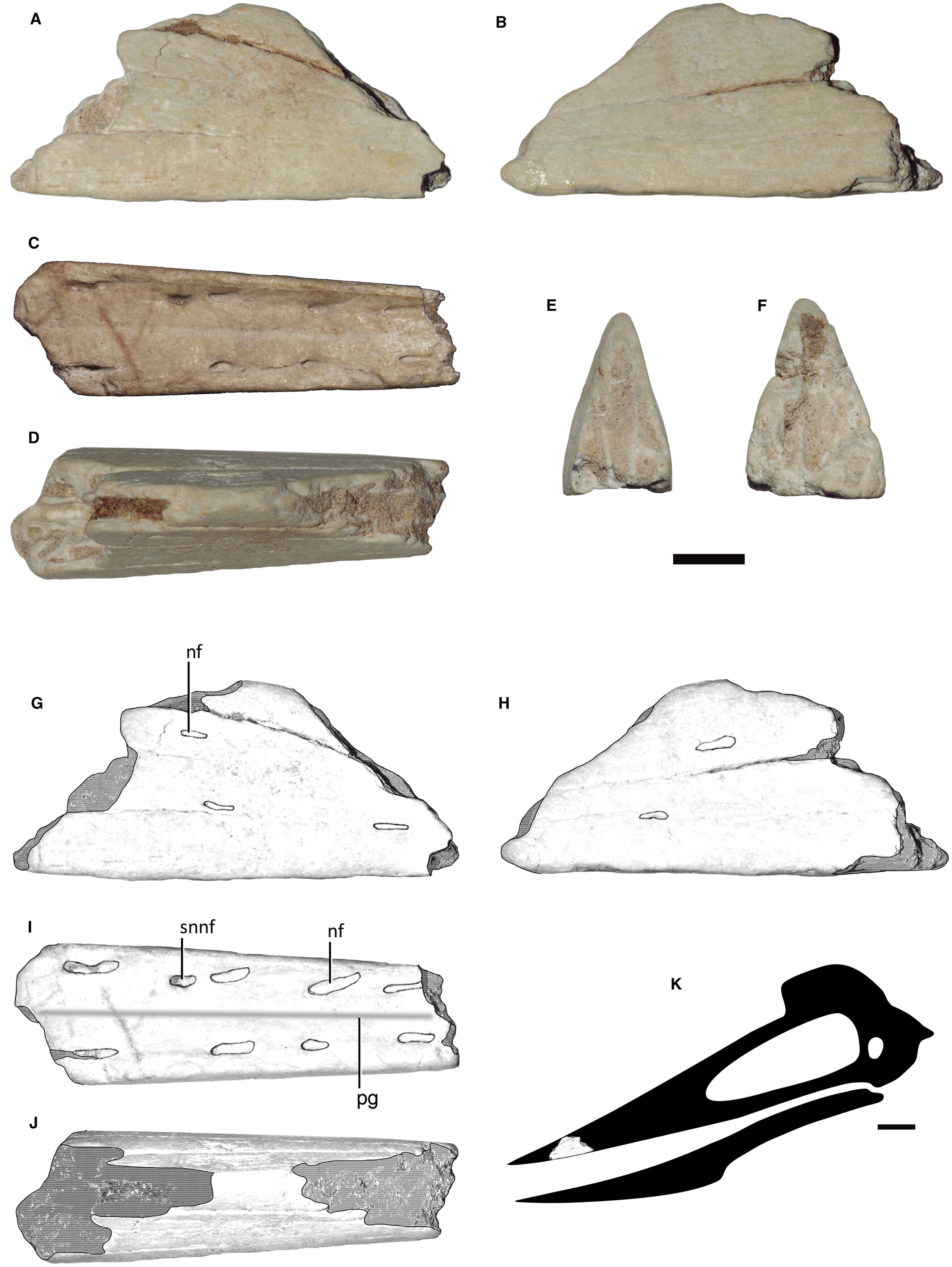
- Holotype specimen and illustration of its placement (white) in a generalized azhdarchid skull

Scientific classification
- Kingdom: Animalia
- Phylum: Chordata
- Order: †Pterosauria
- Suborder: †Pterodactyloidea
- Clade: †Azhdarchoidea
- Family: †Azhdarchidae
- Genus: †Galgadraco; Giaretta et al., 2025
- Species: †G. zephyrius

Binomial name
- †Galgadraco zephyrius Giaretta et al., 2025

= Galgadraco =

Galgadraco Temporal range: Late Cretaceous, late Maastrichtian

Genus of azhdarchid pterosaurs

Galgadraco is an extinct genus of azhdarchid pterosaurs known from the Late Cretaceous (Maastrichtian age) Serra da Galga Formation of Brazil. The genus contains a single species, Galgadraco zephyrius, known from a fragment of the upper beak. It represents the first pterosaur described from the Bauru Group.

== Discovery and naming ==
The Galgadraco holotype specimen, CPPLIP 1853, was discovered in outcrops of the Serra da Galga Formation, about 25 kilometres (16 mi) north of Uberaba, Brazil. The specimen comprises an isolated fragment of the rostrum, deriving from near the tip of the upper jaw.

In 2025, Giaretta and colleagues described Galgadraco zephyrius as a new genus and species of azhdarchid pterosaur based on these fossil remains. The generic name, Galgadraco, combines a reference to both the Serra da Galga Formation and Galga Hill, with the Latin word draco, meaning "dragon". The specific name, zephyrius, is derived from Zéphuros (Ζέφυρος), the Ancient Greek embodiment of the west wind.

== Description ==
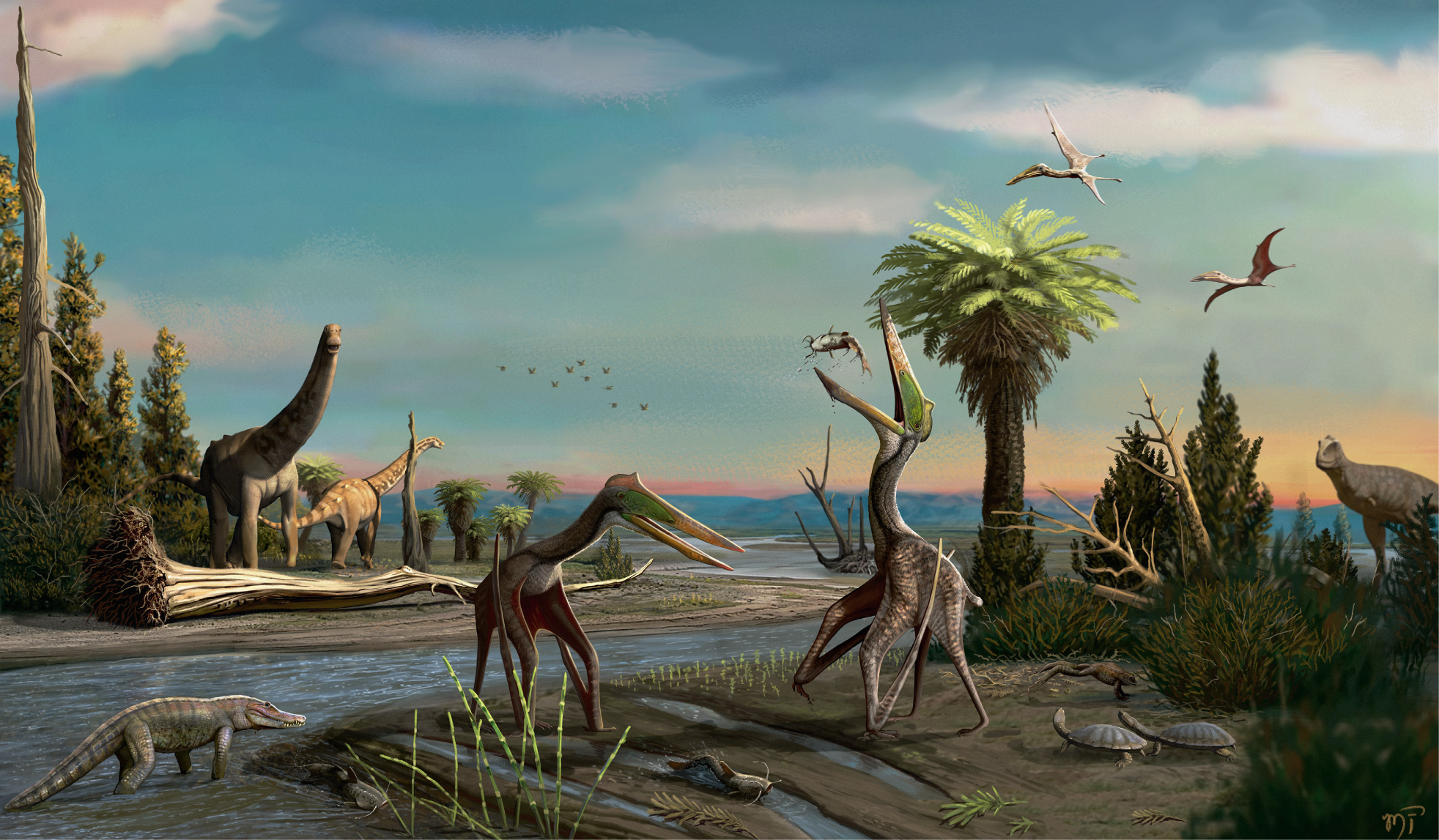
Speculative paleoenvironmental restoration of the Serra da Galga Formation with Galgadraco individuals in the foreground

Based on the proposed close relationships with Albadraco and similarities of the proportions and size of the overlapping rostral elements, Giaretta and colleagues determined that the holotypes of these two pterosaurs would have come from individuals of comparable body sizes. The fourth cervical (neck) vertebra of Albadraco has a maximum width of 7 centimetres (2.8 in) at the prezygapophyses, similar to the corresponding element in Quetzalcoatlus lawsoni. From this, they concluded that a wingspan of around 4–5 m (13–16 ft) was fitting, making Galgadraco a medium-to-large-sized pterosaur, not a giant one like Quetzalcoatlus northropi or a small taxon like Tsogtopteryx.

== Classification ==
To determine the relationships and affinities of Galgadraco, Giaretta and colleagues scored it in a comprehensive pterosaur-focused phylogenetic matrix modified from Zhou et al. (2025), deriving from Pêgas (2024). Their analyses recovered Galgadraco as the sister taxon to the Romanian Albadraco, in a clade also containing Hatzegopteryx, Cryodrakon, and Tsogtopteryx. The results are displayed in the cladogram below, with clade names following Pêgas et al. (2025):

- Azhdarchidae
  - Phosphatodraconia
    ⊞
    - Aralazhdarcho bostobensis
    - - Eurazhdarcho langendorfensis
      - - Phosphatodraco mauritanicus
        - Wellnhopterus brevirostris
    ⊟
  - - - Zhejiangopterus linhaiensis
      - - Mistralazhdarcho maggii
        - Aerotitan sudamericanus
    - - Azhdarcho lancicollis
      - Quetzalcoatlida
        - Hatzegopterygia
          - Tsogtopteryx mongoliensis
          - - Cryodrakon boreas
            - - - Albadraco tharmisensis
                - Galgadraco zephyrius
              - - Pui azhdarchid (LPB (FGGUB) R.2395)
                - Hatzegopteryx thambema
        - Quetzalcoatlini
          - - Nipponopterus mifunensis
            - Gobiazhdarcho tsogtbaatari
          - - Arambourgiania philadelphiae
            - - Thanatosdrakon amaru
              - Quetzalcoatlus lawsoni
              - Quetzalcoatlus northropi
              - aff. Quetzalcoatlus sp. (FSAC-OB 14)
