= Nipponopterus =

Nipponopterus Temporal range: Late Cretaceous, ~Turonian–Coniacian
- Skeletal reconstruction indicating the placement of the holotype (white)

Scientific classification
- Kingdom: Animalia
- Phylum: Chordata
- Class: Reptilia
- Order: †Pterosauria
- Suborder: †Pterodactyloidea
- Clade: †Azhdarchoidea
- Family: †Azhdarchidae
- Clade: †Quetzalcoatlini
- Genus: †Nipponopterus; Zhou et al., 2025
- Species: †N. mifunensis

Binomial name
- †Nipponopterus mifunensis Zhou et al., 2025

Genus of azhdarchid pterosaur from the Late Cretaceous

Nipponopterus (meaning "Nippon wing") is an extinct genus of azhdarchid pterosaur that lived during the Late Cretaceous (Turonian to Coniacian ages) in what is now Japan. It is known from a partial cervical (neck) vertebra found in the 'Upper Formation' of the Mifune Group, located in the Kumamoto Prefecture in Kyūshū. The genus contains a single species, Nipponopterus mifunensis, named and described in 2025. It is the first pterosaur to be named from Japan.

Morphologically, Nipponopterus is similar to the Mongolian genus Gobiazhdarcho. Both are estimated to have had a wingspan measuring around 3 to 3.5 m (9 ft 10 in to 11 ft 6 in) when fully grown. Nipponopterus is a member of the clade Quetzalcoatlinae within the family Azhdarchidae.

== Discovery and naming ==
Nipponopterus type locality in the Mifune Group of Japan.

The holotype specimen of Nipponopterus, MDM 349, was discovered in sediments of the "Upper Formation" of the Mifune Group ('Locality 1018') in rock outcrops near Amagimi Dam in Mifune Town, Kumamoto Prefecture in Kyūshū, Japan. The specimen consists of the posterior end of the sixth cervical (neck) vertebra. The specimen was first described in 2000 as belonging to an indeterminate member of the family Azhdarchidae. The limited understanding of the clade at that time precluded more detailed analyses. While early reviews interpreted the cervical vertebra as the fourth or fifth, the most recent analysis suggests it can confidently be regarded as the sixth.

In 2025, Chinese paleontologist Xuanyu Zhou and colleagues named and described Nipponopterus mifunensis as a new genus and species of azhdarchid pterosaur based on these fossil remains. The generic name Nipponopterus combines "Nippon"—the Japanese name for the country—with "pterus", derived from the Ancient Greek word πτερόν (ptéron), meaning "wing". The specific name mifunensis refers to the type locality in the Mifune Group in Mifune Town. Nipponopterus is the first pterosaur named from Japan.

A wing phalanx and metacarpal belonging to indeterminate azhdarchid pterosaurs are also known from this formation, but have not been referred to Nipponopterus.

== Description ==
Estimated size of an adult individual compared to a human

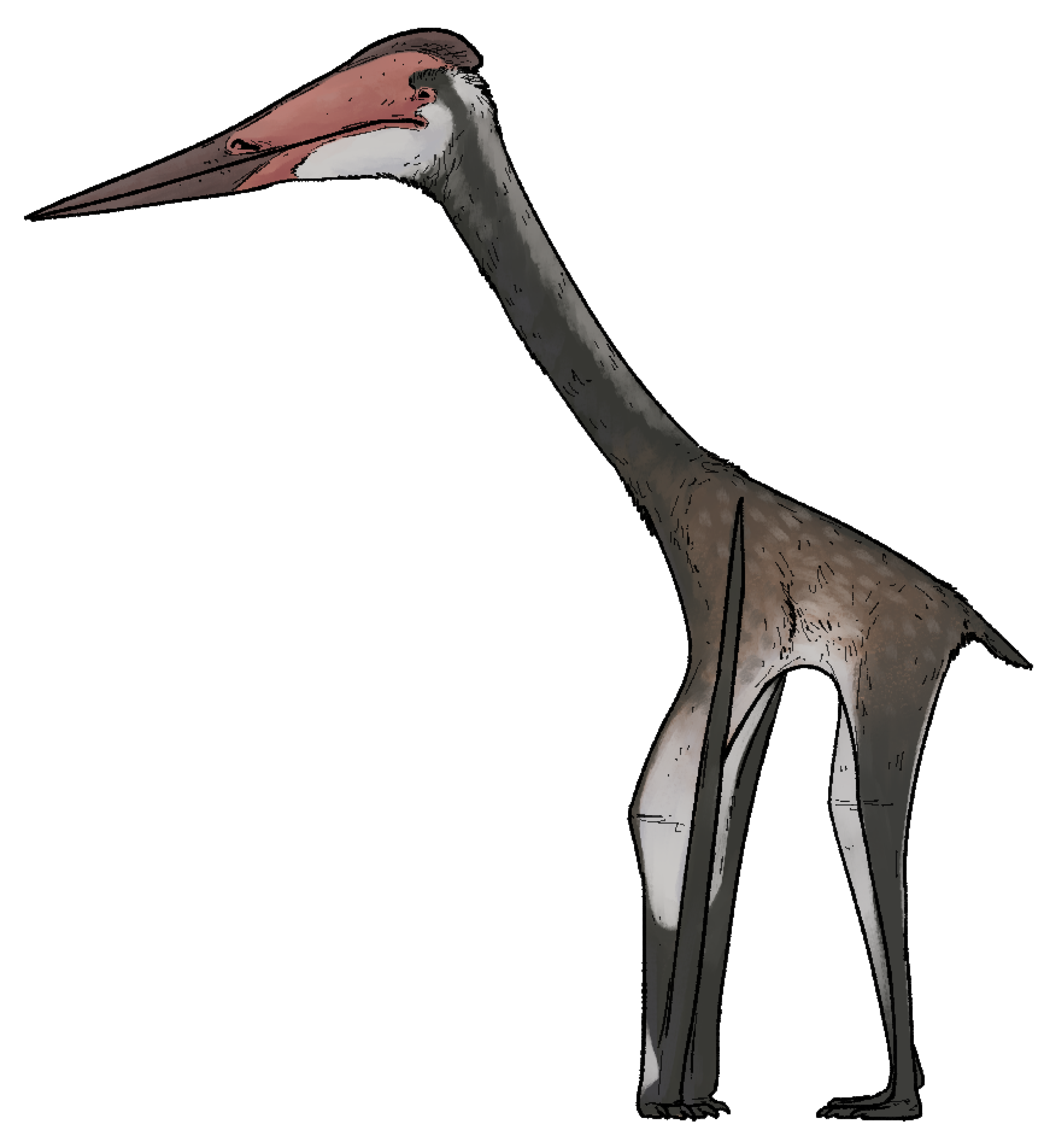
Speculative life restoration

The holotype specimen of Nipponopterus is morphologically comparable to the holotype specimen of Gobiazhdarcho, a similarly fragmentary pterosaur specimen from Mongolia. Measurements of the material of Nipponopterus indicate that it is 82% the size of the Burkhant specimen. However, the former likely belongs to a subadult individual, meaning it was not fully grown. As such, Zhou and colleagues estimated that both pterosaurs would have had similar wingspans, at around 3 to 3.5 m (9 ft 10 in to 11 ft 6 in).

== Classification ==
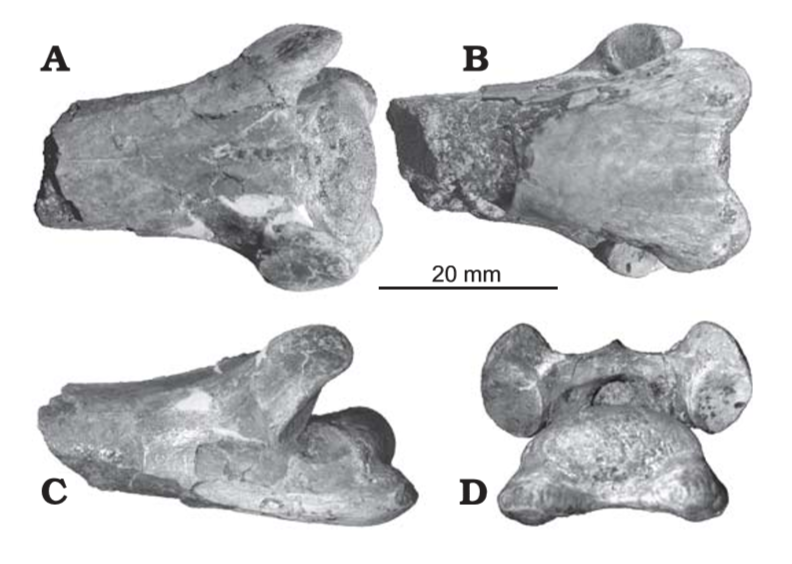
Partial sixth cervical vertebra of the closely related Gobiazhdarcho

In their phylogenetic analysis using the dataset of paleontologist Rubi Pêgas in 2024, Zhou and colleagues recovered Nipponopterus as a member of the clade Quetzalcoatlinae within Azhdarchidae. It was placed as the sister taxon to the "Burkhant azhdarchid", which corroborates their close relationship in terms of similar features and geography. Later that year, Pêgas, Zhou & Kobayashi formally named the "Burkhant azhdarchid" as Gobiazhdarcho tsogtbaatari, in addition to the "Bayshin Tsav azhdarchid" (named Tsogtopteryx mongoliensis). They also provided an updated nomenclatural scheme for azhdarchids. Herein, the authors proposed the new clade Quetzalcoatlini for azhdarchids more closely related to Quetzalcoatlus than to Hatzegopteryx. The topology of their phylogenetic analysis was similar to that of Zhou et al. (2025), but under this scheme, the clade formed by Nipponopterus and Gobiazhdarcho is the first quetzalcoatlin branch. The results of their study are displayed in the cladogram below: ⊞ buttons can be clicked to expand nodes.

- Azhdarchidae
  - Phosphatodraconia
    ⊞
    - Aralazhdarcho bostobensis
    - - Eurazhdarcho langendorfensis
      - - Phosphatodraco mauritanicus
        - Wellnhopterus brevirostris
    ⊟
  - - - Zhejiangopterus linhaiensis
      - - Mistralazhdarcho maggii
        - Aerotitan sudamericanus
    - - Azhdarcho lancicollis
      - Quetzalcoatlida
        - Hatzegopterygia
          ⊞
          - Tsogtopteryx mongoliensis
          - - Cryodrakon boreas
            - - Albadraco tharmisensis
              - - Pui azhdarchid (LPB (FGGUB) R.2395)
                - Hatzegopteryx thambema
          ⊟
        - Quetzalcoatlini
          - - Nipponopterus mifunensis
            - Gobiazhdarcho tsogtbaatari
          - - - Arambourgiania philadelphiae
              - Infernodrakon hastacollis
            - - Thanatosdrakon amaru
              - Quetzalcoatlus lawsoni
              - Quetzalcoatlus northropi
              - aff. Quetzalcoatlus sp. (FSAC-OB 14)
