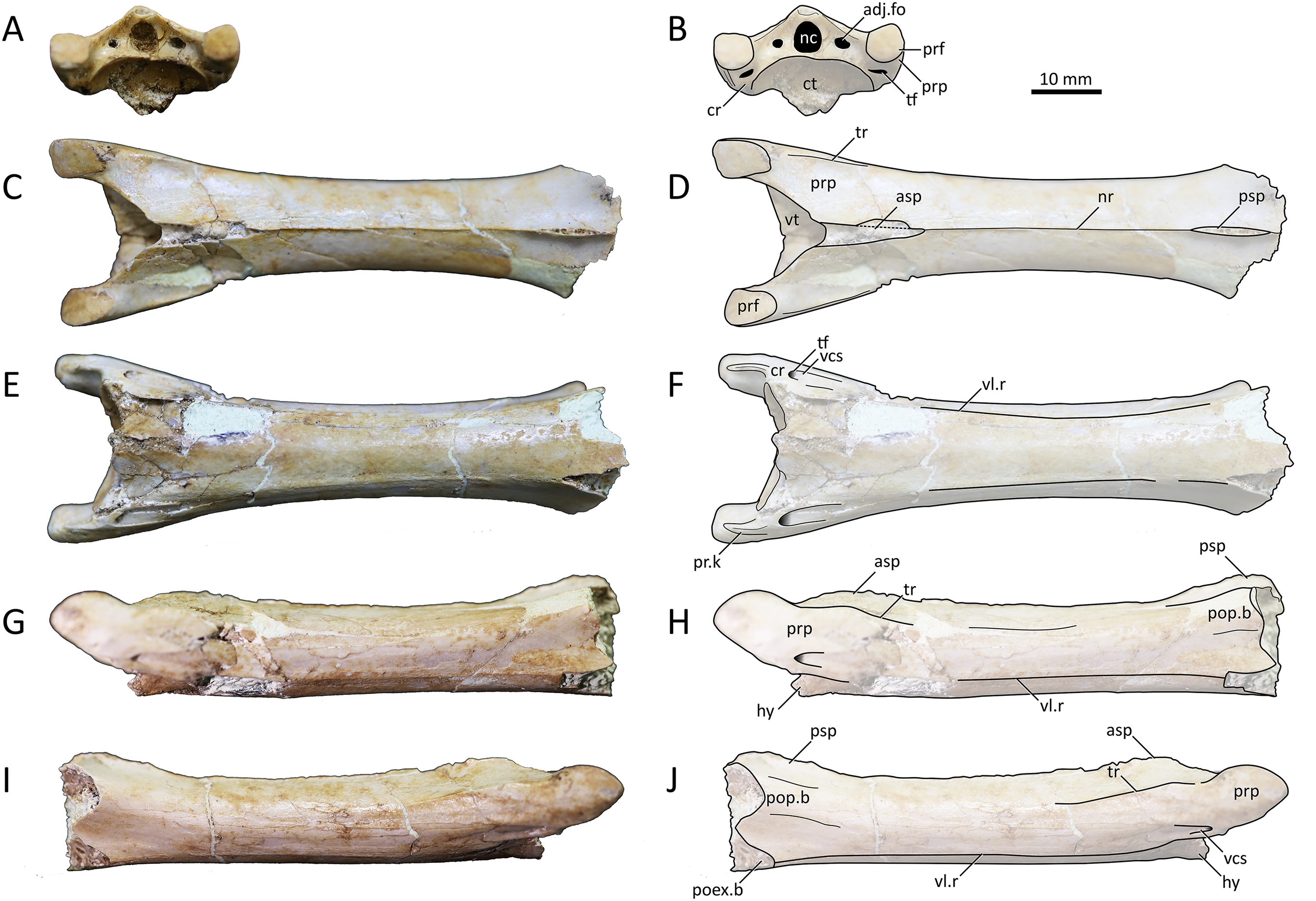
- Holotype cervical vertebra VI

Scientific classification
- Kingdom: Animalia
- Phylum: Chordata
- Class: Reptilia
- Order: †Pterosauria
- Suborder: †Pterodactyloidea
- Clade: †Azhdarchoidea
- Family: †Azhdarchidae
- Clade: †Hatzegopterygia
- Genus: †Tsogtopteryx; Pêgas, Zhou & Kobayashi, 2025
- Species: †T. mongoliensis

Binomial name
- †Tsogtopteryx mongoliensis Pêgas, Zhou & Kobayashi, 2025

= Tsogtopteryx =

Tsogtopteryx Temporal range: Late Cretaceous, Turonian–Santonian

Genus of azhdarchid pterosaurs

Tsogtopteryx (lit. 'mighty hero wing') is an extinct genus of azhdarchid pterosaurs known from the Late Cretaceous Bayanshiree Formation of Mongolia. The genus contains a single species, Tsogtopteryx mongoliensis, known from most of a cervical (neck) vertebra. It was closely related to Hatzegopteryx, and coexisted with Gobiazhdarcho, another azhdarchid more closely related to Quetzalcoatlus.

== Discovery and naming ==
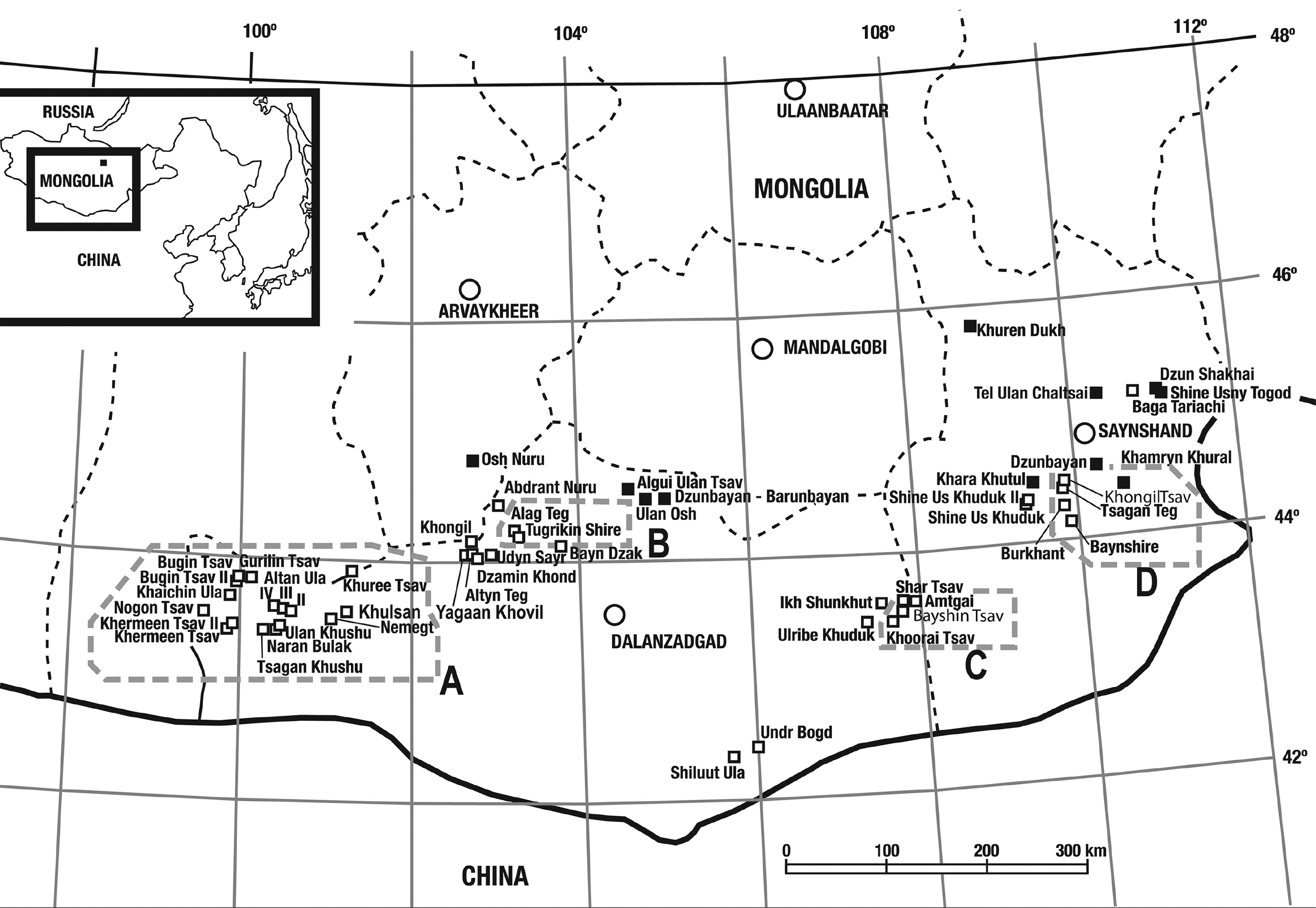
Mongolian Cretaceous fossil localities; Tsogtopteryx is known from the Bayshin Tsav locality in Area C (Bayanshiree Formation)

In 1993, a joint paleontological expedition between the Hayashibara Museum of Natural Sciences and the Mongolian Paleontological Center conducted fieldwork in the Gobi Desert of Mongolia. At the 'Bayshin Tsav' locality of the Bayanshiree Formation in Dornogovi Province, workers collected an isolated cervical (neck) vertebral element. This specimen, accessioned as MPC−Nd 100/303, comprises almost all of the sixth cervical vertebra, missing the posteriormost (furthest back) region. In 2009, Mahito Watabe and colleagues described this specimen, in addition to another isolated pterosaur cervical vertebra from the 'Burkhant' locality of the same formation. The authors refrained from naming either specimen, but discussed their anatomy and likely phylogenetic affinities in depth.

In 2025, R. V. Pêgas, Xuanyu Zhou, and Yoshitsugu Kobayashi described Tsogtopteryx mongoliensis as a new genus and species of pterosaurs based on the 'Bayshin Tsav azhdarchid' fossil remains. The generic name, Tsogtopteryx, combines the Mongolian tsogt, meaning "mighty hero", with the Ancient Greek pteryx, meaning 'wing'. The specific name, mongoliensis, references the discovery of the specimen in Mongolia. In the same publication, the authors also named the Burkhant specimen as another new azhdarchid, Gobiazhdarcho.

Prior to the naming of Tsogtopteryx and Gobiazhdarcho, the only pterosaur named from Mongolia was the dsungaripterid Noripterus parvus, known from the Tsagan-Tsab Formation. Several fragmentary indeterminate pterosaur remains are also known from the country, including a possible anurognathid, anhanguerid, and tapejaroid, in addition to a possible azhdarchid long bone found in the stomach of a dromaeosaurid dinosaur and the very fragmentary remains of a giant azhdarchid.

== Description ==
Based on the size of the holotype vertebra (more than 7.7 centimetres (3.0 in) long), the wingspan of Tsogtopteryx was estimated at 1.6–1.9 metres (5.2–6.2 ft), which is remarkably small for an azhdarchid. This would make it the smallest named azhdarchid, only smaller than an unnamed possible member of the clade from the Northumberland Formation of Canada, which has an estimated wingspan of 1.6 m (5.2 ft) or less. Despite this diminutive size, the specimen likely belongs to a skeletally mature (fully grown) individual. This was determined based on the lack of a grained texture often seen in immature pterosaur bones and the full fusion of the cervical ribs to the vertebra, which does not happen until maturity. In comparison, the coeval Gobiazhdarcho was not yet fully grown but was notably larger with a 3–3.5 metres (9.8–11.5 ft) wingspan.

== Classification ==
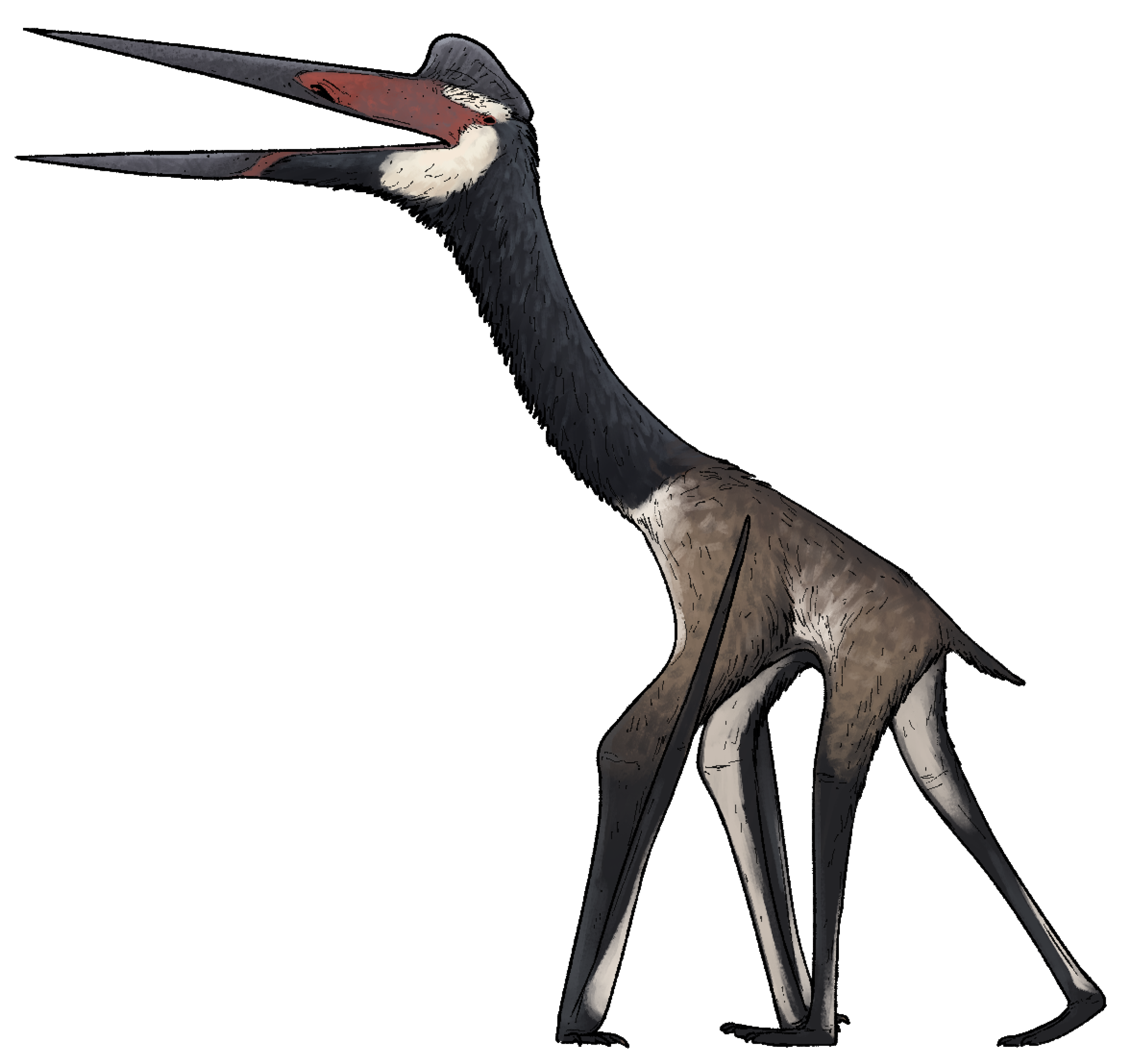
Life restoration of the related Cryodrakon

To determine the relationships and affinities of Tsogtopteryx, Pêgas and colleagues scored it in a comprehensive pterosaur-focused phylogenetic matrix modified from Zhou et al. (2025), deriving from Pêgas (2024) and other earlier publications, with modifications based on newer literature. Their analyses recovered Tsogtopteryx as the basalmost member of the clade Hatzegopterygia, which includes azhdarchids more closely related to Hatzegopteryx than Quetzalcoatlus. The results are displayed in the cladogram below:

- Azhdarchidae
  - Phosphatodraconia
    ⊞
    - Aralazhdarcho bostobensis
    - - Eurazhdarcho langendorfensis
      - - Phosphatodraco mauritanicus
        - Wellnhopterus brevirostris
    ⊟
  - - - Zhejiangopterus linhaiensis
      - - Mistralazhdarcho maggii
        - Aerotitan sudamericanus
    - - Azhdarcho lancicollis
      - Quetzalcoatlida
        - Hatzegopterygia
          - Tsogtopteryx mongoliensis
          - - Cryodrakon boreas
            - - Albadraco tharmisensis
              - - Pui azhdarchid (LPB (FGGUB) R.2395)
                - Hatzegopteryx thambema
        - Quetzalcoatlini
          - - Nipponopterus mifunensis
            - Gobiazhdarcho tsogtbaatari
          - - - Arambourgiania philadelphiae
              - Infernodrakon hastacollis
            - - Thanatosdrakon amaru
              - Quetzalcoatlus lawsoni
              - Quetzalcoatlus northropi
              - aff. Quetzalcoatlus sp. (FSAC-OB 14)

== Paleoenvironment ==
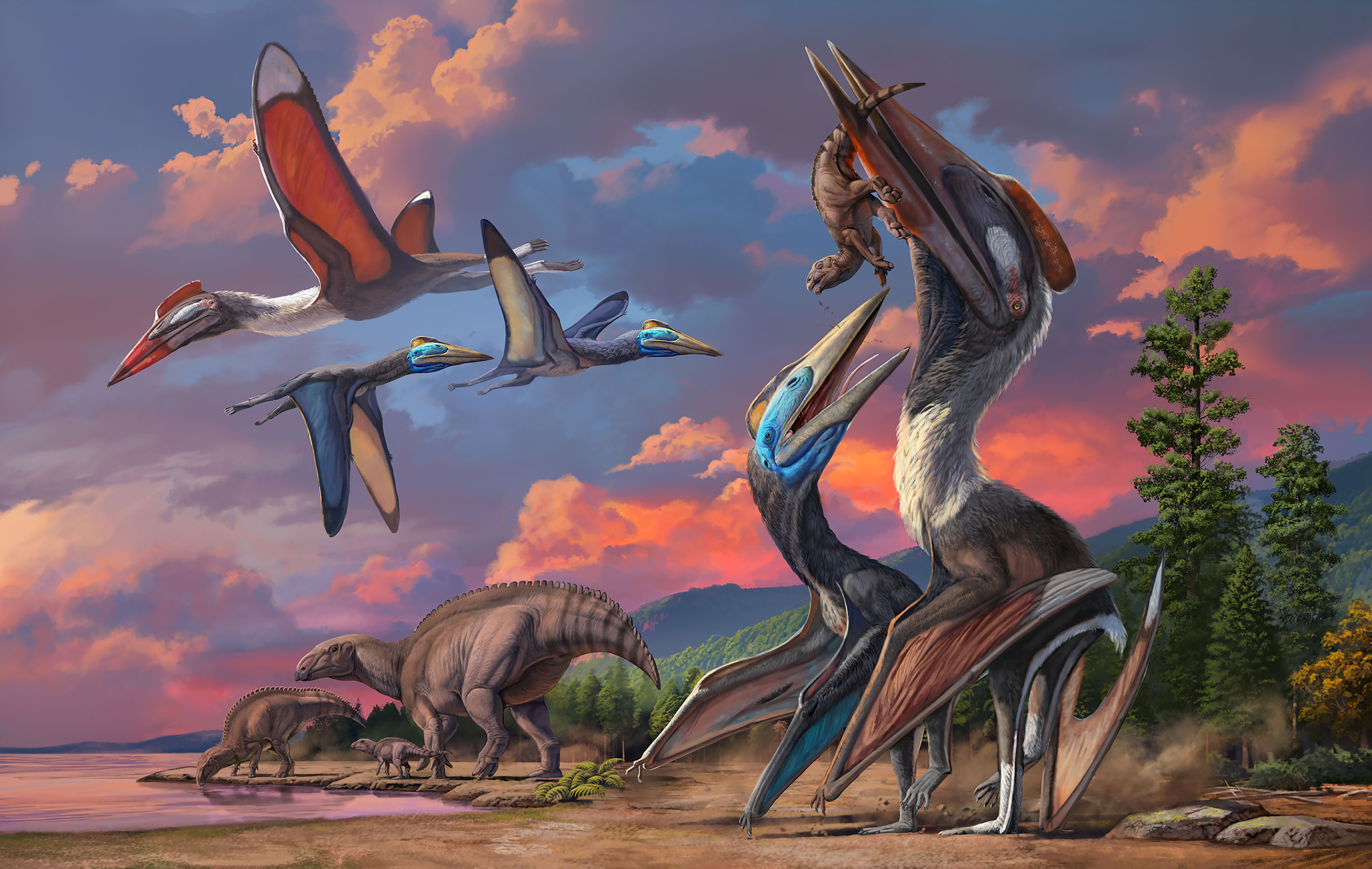
Speculative life restoration of Tsogtopteryx (smaller; blue) and Gobiazhdarcho (larger; red) in a Bayanshiree environment with the ornithopod dinosaur Gobihadros

Tsogtopteryx is known from the 'Bayshin Tsav' locality of the Bayanshiree Formation. Examinations of the magnetostratigraphy of the formation confirm that it lies entirely within the Cretaceous Long Normal, which lasted only until the end of the Santonian stage. Calcite U–Pb measurements estimate the age of the Bayanshiree Formation from 95.9 ± 6.0 million to 89.6 ± 4.0 million years ago, in the Albian through Santonian ages. Considering all available evidence, there are likely two distinct levels of the formation—an 'upper' and 'lower'—partially based on faunal differences: a lower part lasting from the Cenomanian to late Turonian ages and an upper part lasting the late Turonian to Santonian ages in the late Cretaceous period. The Bayshin Tsav locality is part of the upper Bayanshiree.

Fluvial, lacustrine and caliche-based sedimentation indicates a lesser semi-arid climate, with the presence of wet environments composed of large meanders and lakes. Large-scale cross-stratification in many of the sandstone layers at the Baynshire and Burkhant localities seems to indicate large meandering rivers, and these large water bodies may have drained the eastern part of the Gobi Desert.

A vast faunal diversity is known in the formation, comprising dinosaur and non-dinosaur genera. Dinosaurs definitively recognized from the Bayshin Tsav locality include the tyrannosauroid Khankhuuluu, the ornithomimosaur Garudimimus, the therizinosaurs Erlikosaurus and Segnosaurus, the ankylosaur Talarurus, and the hadrosauroid Gobihadros. Other theropod dinosaurs from other localities include the additional therizinosaurs Duonychus and Enigmosaurus, and the large dromaeosaurid Achillobator. Herbivorous dinosaurs from other localities are represented by the ankylosaur Tsagantegia, the small marginocephalians Amtocephale (a pachycephalosaur) and Graciliceratops (a ceratopsian), and the sauropod Erketu. Other fauna include semiaquatic reptiles like crocodylomorphs and nanhsiungchelyid turtles, and various fish. Numerous fossilized fruits have been recovered from the Bor Guvé and Khara Khutul localities.
