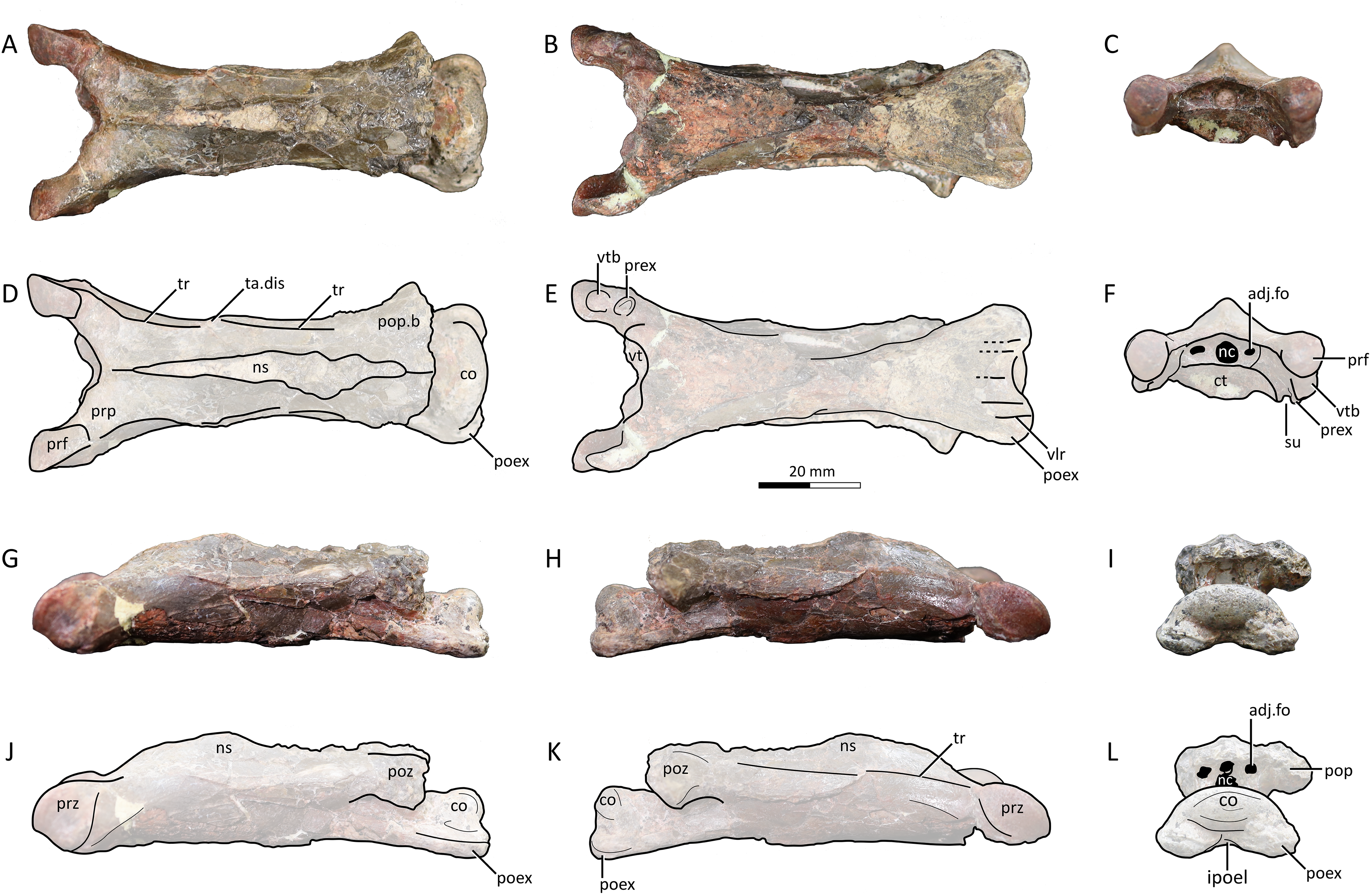
- Third cervical vertebra of the holotype

Scientific classification
- Kingdom: Animalia
- Phylum: Chordata
- Class: Reptilia
- Order: †Pterosauria
- Suborder: †Pterodactyloidea
- Clade: †Azhdarchoidea
- Family: †Azhdarchidae
- Clade: †Quetzalcoatlini
- Genus: †Gobiazhdarcho; Pêgas, Zhou & Kobayashi, 2025
- Species: †G. tsogtbaatari

Binomial name
- †Gobiazhdarcho tsogtbaatari Pêgas, Zhou & Kobayashi, 2025

= Gobiazhdarcho =

Gobiazhdarcho Temporal range: Late Cretaceous, Turonian–Santonian

Genus of azhdarchid pterosaurs

Gobiazhdarcho (lit. 'Gobi Desert azhdar') is an extinct genus of azhdarchid pterosaurs known from the Late Cretaceous Bayanshiree Formation of Mongolia. The genus contains a single species, Gobiazhdarcho tsogtbaatari, known from three cervical (neck) vertebrae. It was closely related to Quetzalcoatlus and coexisted with Tsogtopteryx, another azhdarchid more closely related to Hatzegopteryx.

== Discovery and naming ==
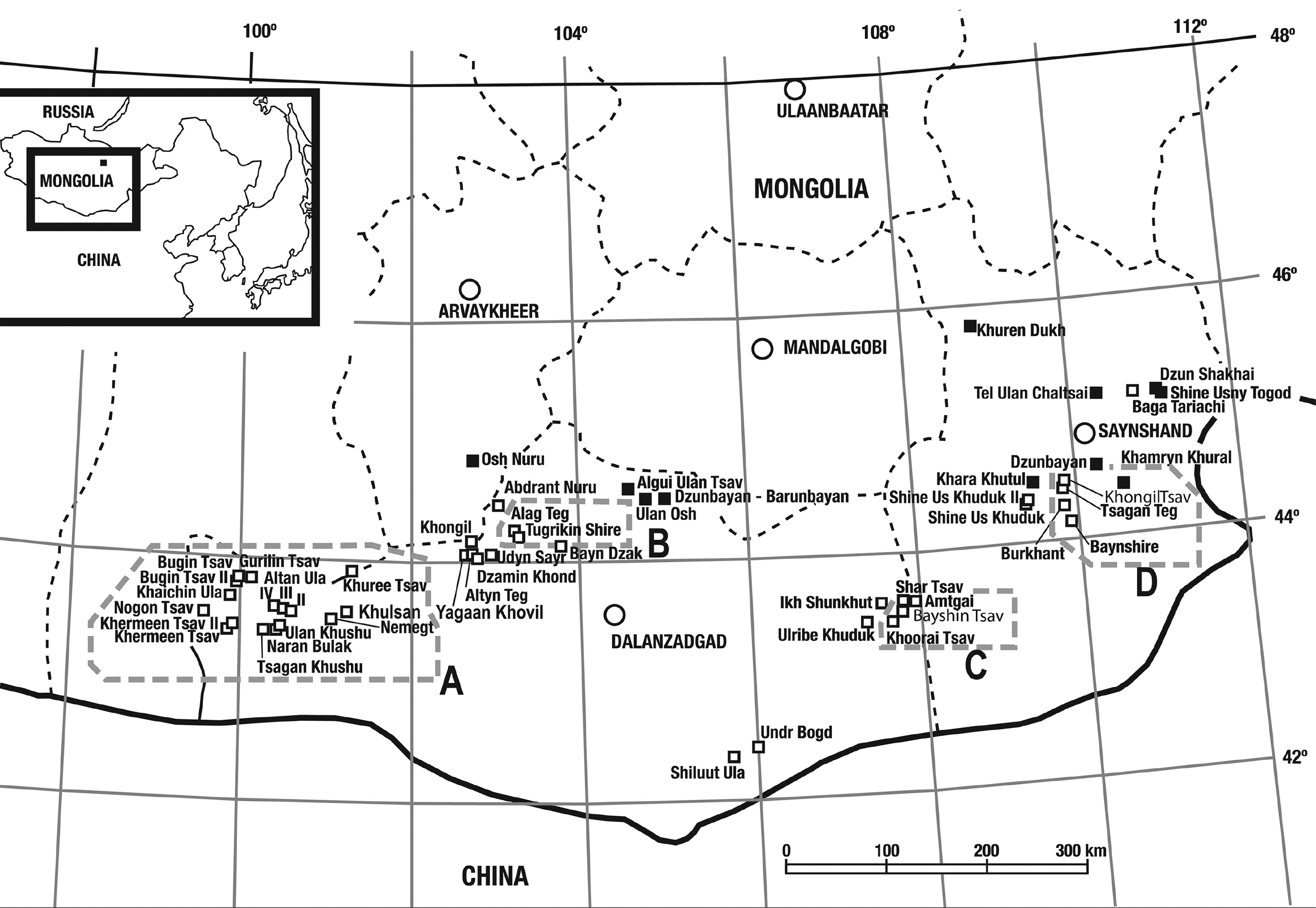
Mongolian Cretaceous fossil localities; Gobiazhdarcho is known from the Burkhant locality in Area D (Bayanshiree Formation)

In 1995, a joint paleontological expedition between the Hayashibara Museum of Natural Sciences and the Mongolian Paleontological Center conducted fieldwork in the Gobi Desert of Mongolia. At the 'Burkhant' locality of the Bayanshiree Formation in Dornogovi Province, workers collected three associated cervical (neck) vertebral elements. These specimens, accessioned as MPC−Nd 100/302, include the atlantoaxis (fused first and second cervicals), the third cervical, and the posterior (back) part of the sixth cervical (identified as the fourth by Averianov in 2014). In 2009, Mahito Watabe and colleagues described this specimen, in addition to another isolated pterosaur cervical vertebra from the 'Bayshin Tsav' locality of the same formation. The authors refrained from naming either specimen, but discussed their anatomy and likely phylogenetic affinities in depth.

In 2025, R. V. Pêgas, Xuanyu Zhou, and Yoshitsugu Kobayashi described Gobiazhdarcho tsogtbaatari as a new genus and species of pterosaurs based on the 'Burkhant azhdarchid' fossil remains. The generic name, Gobiazhdarcho, combines "Gobi", a reference to the discovery of the specimen in the Gobi Desert, with "azhdarcho", derived from azhdar, a dragonlike creature in Persian myth. The specific name, tsogtbaatari, honors Mongolian paleontologist Khishigjav Tsogtbaatar. In the same publication, the authors also named the Bayshin Tsav specimen as another new azhdarchid, Tsogtopteryx.

Prior to the naming of Gobiazhdarcho and Tsogtopteryx, the only pterosaur named from Mongolia was the dsungaripterid Noripterus parvus, known from the Tsagan-Tsab Formation. Several fragmentary indeterminate pterosaur remains are also known from the country, including a possible anurognathid, anhanguerid, and tapejaroid, in addition to a possible azhdarchid long bone found in the stomach of a dromaeosaurid dinosaur and the very fragmentary remains of a giant azhdarchid.

== Description ==
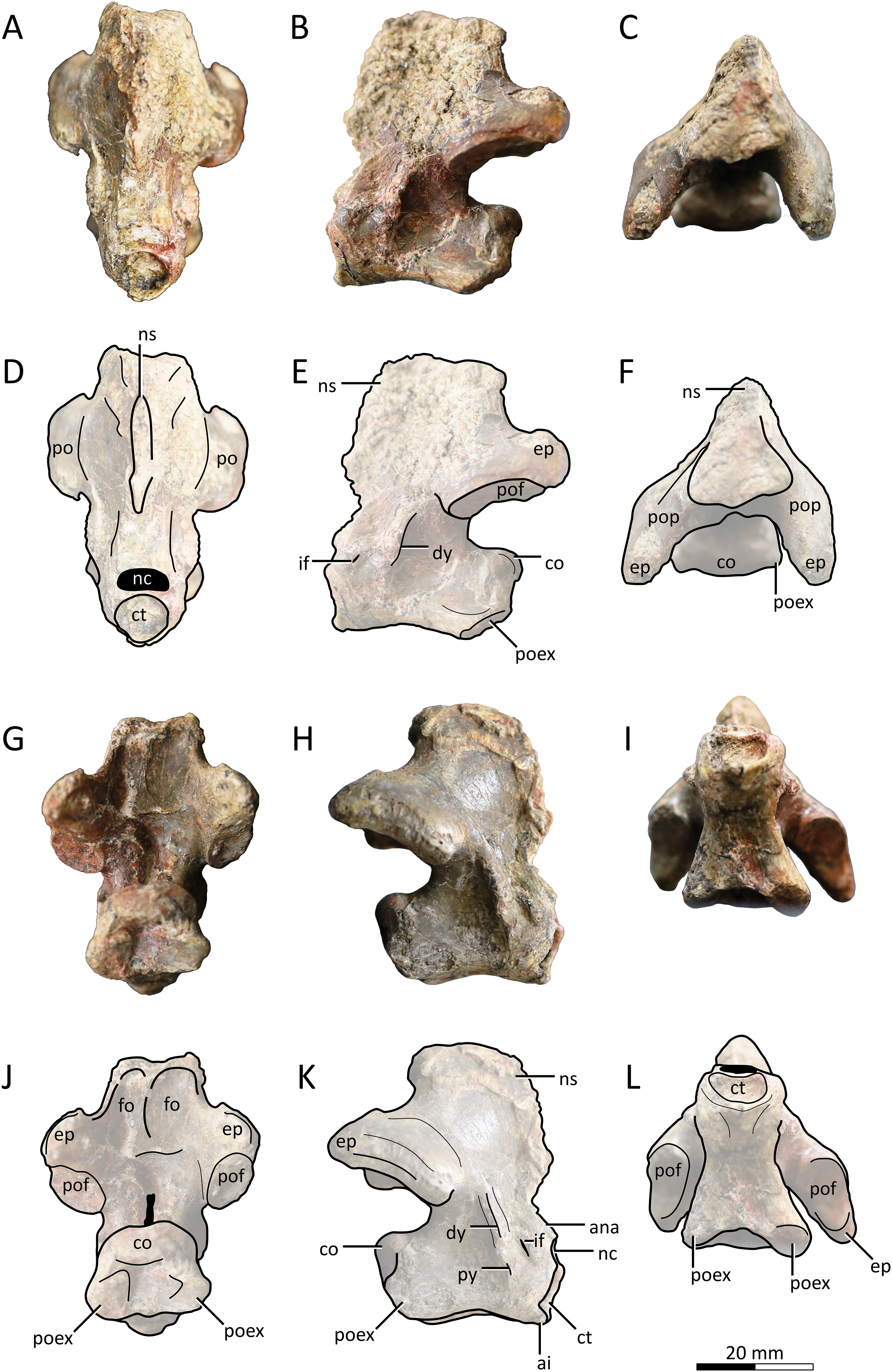
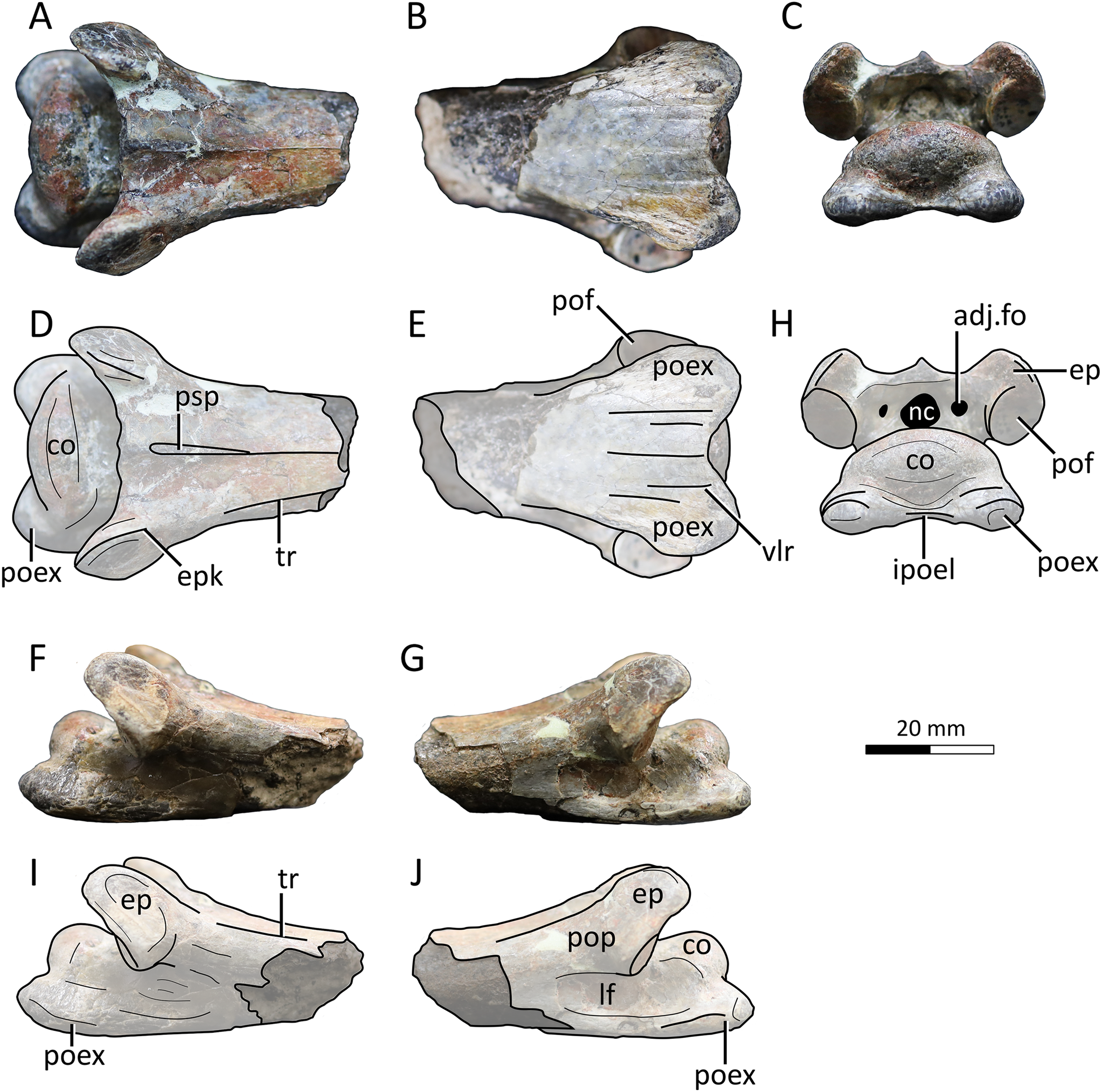
Atlantoaxis (left) and fourth cervical vertebra (right) of the holotype

Based on the size of the holotype vertebrae (third cervical 9.06 centimetres (3.57 in) long), the wingspan of Gobiazhdarcho was estimated at 3–3.5 metres (9.8–11.5 ft), which is comparable in size to Eurazhdarcho, Wellnhopterus, and Zhejiangopterus. The specimen likely belongs to a late subadult individual that was nearly skeletally mature (fully grown). This was determined based on the lack of a grained texture often seen in immature pterosaur bones and the full fusion of the atlas and axis—both characteristics of mature pterosaurs—combined with the lack of ribs fused to the vertebra, an indication of immaturity. In comparison, the coeval Tsogtopteryx was fully grown but much smaller, with a 1.6–1.9 metres (5.2–6.2 ft) wingspan.

== Classification ==
To determine the relationships and affinities of Gobiazhdarcho, Pêgas and colleagues scored it in a comprehensive pterosaur-focused phylogenetic matrix modified from Zhou et al. (2025), deriving from Pêgas (2024) and other earlier publications, with modifications based on newer literature. Their analyses recovered Gobiazhdarcho as the sister taxon to Nipponopterus in an early-branching clade within the clade Quetzalcoatlini, which includes azhdarchids more closely related to Quetzalcoatlus than Hatzegopteryx. The results are displayed in the cladogram below:

- Azhdarchidae
  - Phosphatodraconia
    ⊞
    - Aralazhdarcho bostobensis
    - - Eurazhdarcho langendorfensis
      - - Phosphatodraco mauritanicus
        - Wellnhopterus brevirostris
    ⊟
  - - - Zhejiangopterus linhaiensis
      - - Mistralazhdarcho maggii
        - Aerotitan sudamericanus
    - - Azhdarcho lancicollis
      - Quetzalcoatlida
        - Hatzegopterygia
          - Tsogtopteryx mongoliensis
          - - Cryodrakon boreas
            - - Albadraco tharmisensis
              - - Pui azhdarchid (LPB (FGGUB) R.2395)
                - Hatzegopteryx thambema
        - Quetzalcoatlini
          - - Nipponopterus mifunensis
            - Gobiazhdarcho tsogtbaatari
          - - - Arambourgiania philadelphiae
              - Infernodrakon hastacollis
            - - Thanatosdrakon amaru
              - Quetzalcoatlus lawsoni
              - Quetzalcoatlus northropi
              - aff. Quetzalcoatlus sp. (FSAC-OB 14)

== Paleoenvironment ==
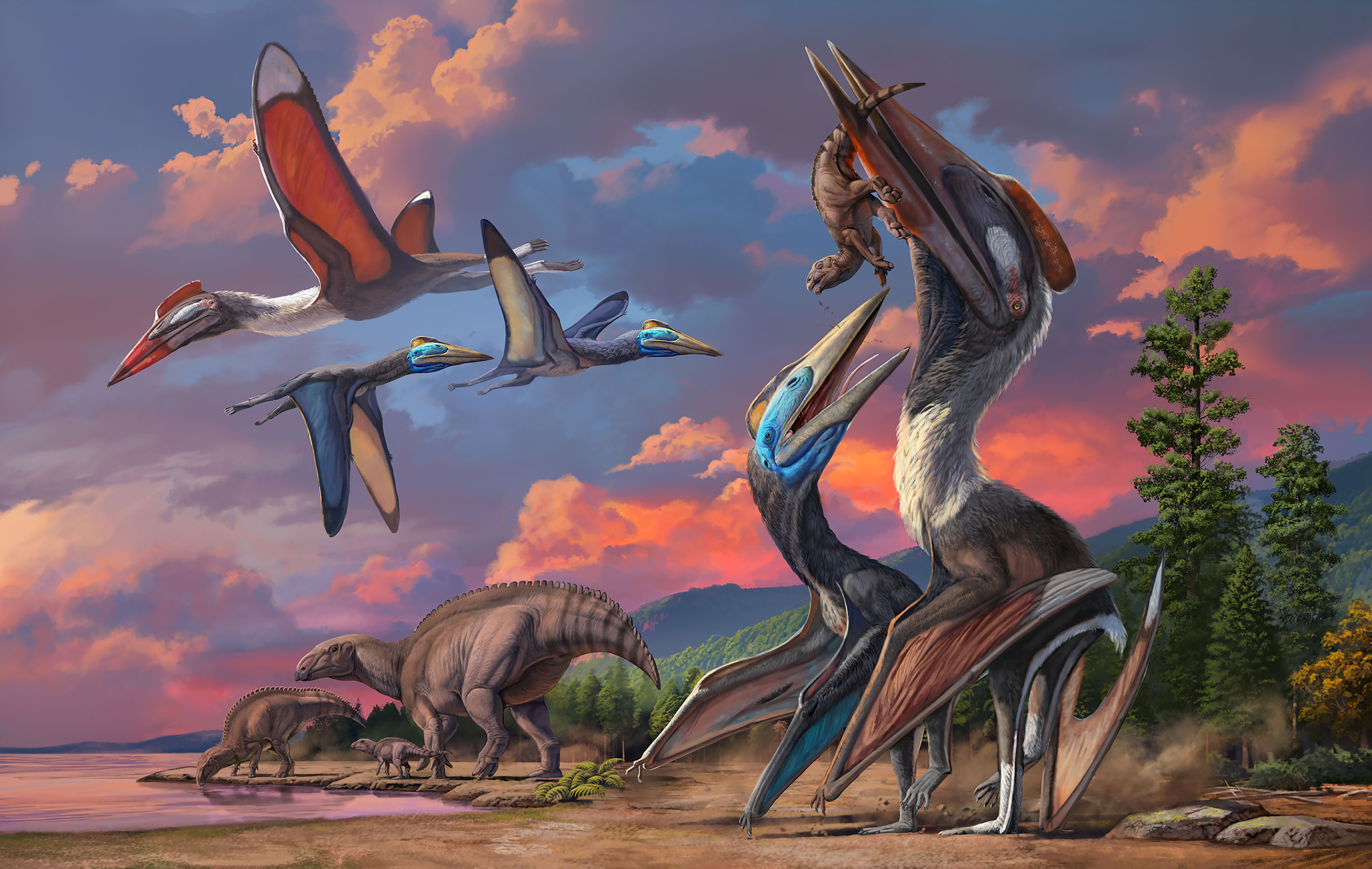
Speculative life restoration of Gobiazhdarcho (larger; red) and Tsogtopteryx (smaller; blue) in a Bayanshiree environment with the ornithopod dinosaur Gobihadros

Gobiazhdarcho is known from the 'Burkhant' locality of the Bayanshiree Formation. Examinations of the magnetostratigraphy of the formation confirm that it lies entirely within the Cretaceous Long Normal, which lasted only until the end of the Santonian stage. Calcite U–Pb measurements estimate the age of the Bayanshiree Formation from 95.9 ± 6.0 million to 89.6 ± 4.0 million years ago, in the Albian through Santonian ages. Considering all available evidence, there are likely two distinct levels of the formation—an 'upper' and 'lower'—partially based on faunal differences: a lower part lasting from the Cenomanian to late Turonian ages and an upper part lasting the late Turonian to Santonian ages in the late Cretaceous period. The Burkhant is part of the upper Bayanshiree.

Fluvial, lacustrine and caliche-based sedimentation indicates a lesser semi-arid climate, with the presence of wet environments composed of large meanders and lakes. Large-scale cross-stratification in many of the sandstone layers at the Baynshire and Burkhant localities seems to indicate large meandering rivers, and these large water bodies may have drained the eastern part of the Gobi Desert.

A vast faunal diversity is known in the formation, comprising dinosaur and non-dinosaur genera. The large dromaeosaurid Achillobator is also recognized from the Burkhant locality. Theropod dinosaurs from other localities include the therizinosaurs Duonychus, Erlikosaurus, Enigmosaurus, and Segnosaurus, the tyrannosauroid Khankhuuluu, and the ornithomimosaur Garudimimus. Herbivorous dinosaurs are represented by the ankylosaurs Talarurus and Tsagantegia, the small marginocephalians Amtocephale (a pachycephalosaur) and Graciliceratops (a ceratopsian), the hadrosauroid Gobihadros, and the sauropod Erketu. Other fauna include semiaquatic reptiles like crocodylomorphs and nanhsiungchelyid turtles, and various fish. Numerous fossilized fruits have been recovered from the Bor Guvé and Khara Khutul localities.
