= Kabu Formation =

- Stratigraphic range: Cenomanian, ~96 Ma
- Type: Geological formation
- Unit of: Mifune Group
- Underlies: Jobu Formation
- Overlies: Unconformity with metamorphic rocks and Permian Mizukoshi Formation
- Thickness: probably up to 1,500 metres (4,900 ft) deep

Lithology
- Primary: Mudstone

Location
- Coordinates: 32.7°N 130.9°E
- Approximate paleocoordinates: 45.1°N 124.2°E
- Region: Fukui Prefecture
- Country: Japan

Type section
- Named by: Y. Hasegwa, M. Manabe, and Y. Azuma
- Kabu Formation (Japan)

The Kabu Formation is a Late Cretaceous geologic formation of Middle Cenomanian age and is part of the Mifune Group. Dinosaur remains are among the fossils that have been recovered from the formation, although none have yet been referred to a specific genus. The formation was named by N. & K. Wasada in 1979.

== Vertebrate paleofauna ==
Genus	Species	Location	Stratigraphic position	Material	Notes	Images
Megalosauridae? (nicknamed Mifune-ryu)	Indeterminate	Mifune-ryu, Kami-Umeki		"Tooth (discovered in 1979)"	Could have been the same animal as Mifunesaurus	
Mifunesaurus	No species given	Mifune-ryu, Kami-Umeki		"Tibia, a phalanx, a metatarsus and a single tooth (tooth catalogued as YNUGI 10003; rest of the skeleton catalogued as MDM 341)"	Informal species. Often referred to Tetanurae indet.	
