= Mifune Group =

Geologic formation in Japan

- Stratigraphic range: Late Cretaceous, Cenomanian
- Type: Geological formation
- Sub-units: Jobu Formation, Kabu Formation, Mihune Formation
- Overlies: Unconformity with metamorphic rocks and Permian Mizukoshi Formation
- Thickness: Over 1500 metres

Location
- Country: Japan

The Mifune Group or Mihune Formation is a Mesozoic geologic formation in Japan. It contains dinosaur fossils.

== Fossils ==
Fossils found in the unit include indeterminate dinosaur remains, the turtles Adocus, Shachemys, and Tienfucheloides, and the pterosaur Nipponopterus.

== See also ==
- List of dinosaur-bearing rock formations
  - List of stratigraphic units with indeterminate dinosaur fossils
