= Jobu Formation =

Geologic formation in Japan

- Stratigraphic range: late Cenomanian; ~96–94 Ma
- Type: Geological formation
- Unit of: Mifune Group

Lithology
- Primary: Mudstone

Location
- Coordinates: 32.7°N 130.9°E
- Approximate paleocoordinates: 44.4°N 123.5°E
- Region: Fukui, Kumamoto
- Country: Japan
- Jobu Formation (Japan)

The Jobu Formation is a Cretaceous geologic formation of Late Cenomanian age. Dinosaur remains are among the fossils that have been recovered from the formation, although none have yet been referred to a specific genus. The oldest confirmed tyrannosaurid premaxillary tooth was recovered from the Jobu Formation. The mammal Sorlestes is also known from the formation.

== Fossil content ==
The following fossils were reported from the formation:

- Mammals
  - Sorlestes mifunensis
- Dinosaurs
  - Segnosaurus sp.
  - Ceratopsia indet.
  - Tetanurae indet.
  - Theropoda indet.
  - Tyrannosauridae indet.
- Pterosaurs
  - Azhdarchidae indet.
- Turtles
  - Adocus sp.
  - Shachemys sp.
  - Nanhsiungchelyidae indet.

== See also ==
- List of dinosaur-bearing rock formations
  - List of stratigraphic units with indeterminate dinosaur fossils
