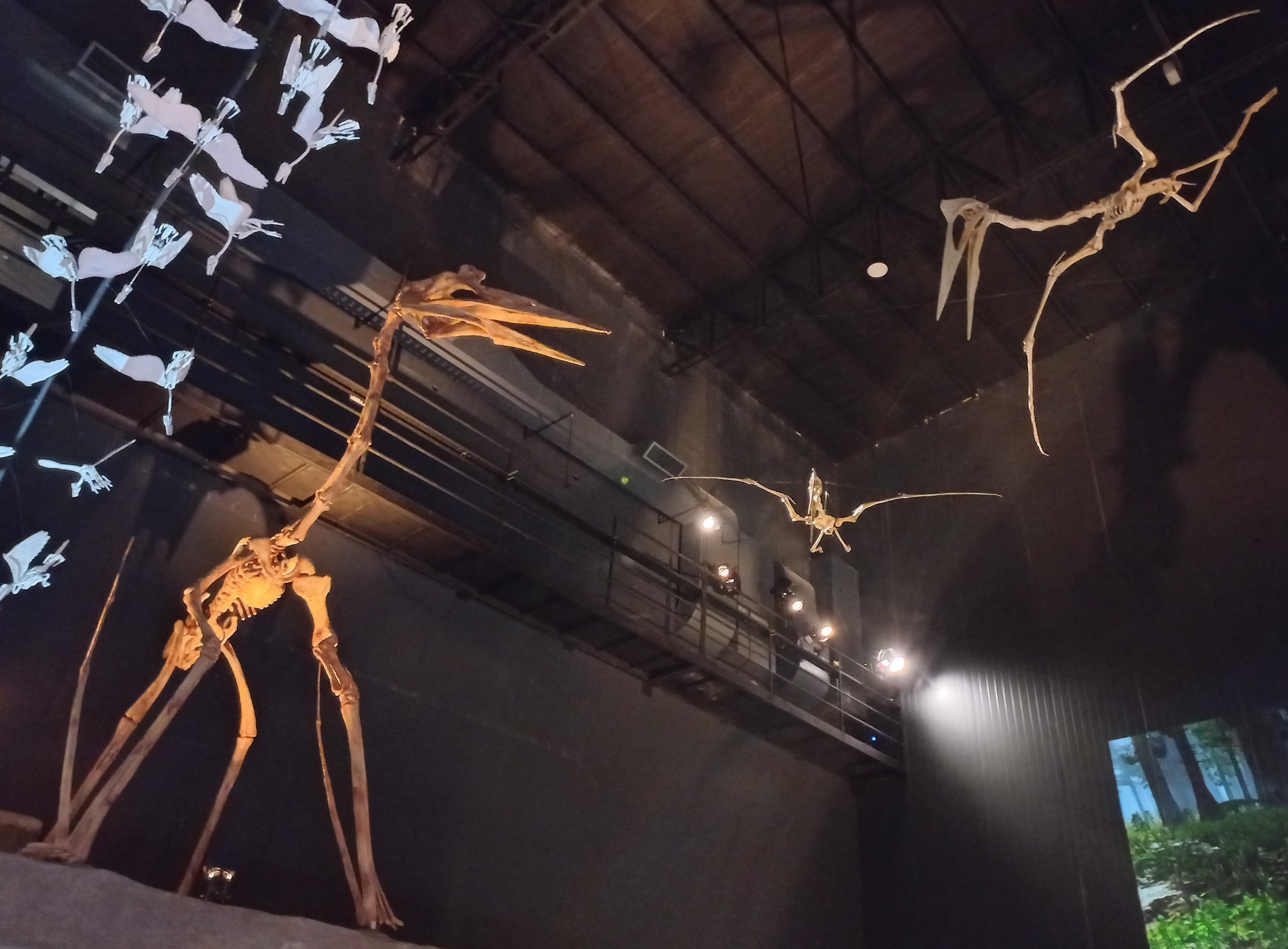
- Reconstructed skeleton (left) in standing posture

Scientific classification
- Kingdom: Animalia
- Phylum: Chordata
- Class: Reptilia
- Order: †Pterosauria
- Suborder: †Pterodactyloidea
- Clade: †Azhdarchoidea
- Family: †Azhdarchidae
- Clade: †Quetzalcoatlini
- Genus: †Thanatosdrakon; Ortiz David et al., 2022
- Species: †T. amaru

Binomial name
- †Thanatosdrakon amaru Ortiz David et al., 2022

= Thanatosdrakon =

Thanatosdrakon Temporal range: Coniacian to Santonian, ~89.6–86.3 Ma

Genus of azhdarchid pterosaur

Thanatosdrakon is an extinct genus of azhdarchid pterosaur that lived during the Coniacian and Santonian ages of the Late Cretaceous period in what is now Argentina, around 89.6 and 86.3 million years ago. Its remains were found in the Plottier Formation of the Neuquén Basin in the Mendoza Province. The genus only consists of the type species, Thanatosdrakon amaru, named and described by paleontologists Leonardo Ortiz David, Bernardo González Riga, and Alexander Kellner. Its generic name means "dragon of death" in Greek, while its specific name is a Quechuan word meaning "flying serpent" and refers to the Incan deity Amaru. Thanatosdrakon is known from two specimens, the holotype, consisting of a partial postcranial skeleton, and the paratype, consisting of a left humerus. The holotype includes material that is previously undescribed in giant azhdarchid pterosaurs.

Thanatosdrakon was a giant pterosaur. The holotype specimen is estimated to have had a wingspan of around 7 m (23 ft), while the paratype has been given an even larger wingspan estimate at around 9 m (30 ft), making Thanatosdrakon the largest known pterosaur from South America. In its description, Thanatosdrakon was assigned to the subfamily Quetzalcoatlinae within the family Azhdarchidae, closely related to both Quetzalcoatlus and Cryodrakon. Thanatosdrakon coexisted with a wide range of dinosaur and non-dinosaur taxa, as demonstrated by the diverse and abundant fossil remains found in the Plottier Formation.

== Discovery and naming ==
The fossil remains of Thanatosdrakon were uncovered in the uppermost Plottier Formation of the Neuquén Basin, located in the province of Mendoza, Argentina, within the Andean Mountain Range. The rock formation dates to the upper Coniacian and lower Santonian of the Late Cretaceous period, around 89.6 to 86.3 million years ago. The remains include two well-preserved specimens that were first described back in 2018. In 2022, these fossil remains were given a new genus and type species, Thanatosdrakon amaru, named and described by Brazilian paleontologists Leonardo Ortiz David, Bernardo González Riga, and Alexander Kellner. The generic name Thanatosdrakon is derived from the Greek words θάνατος (thanatos, meaning "death") and δράκων (drakon, meaning "dragon"), and is translated as "dragon of death". The specific name amaru is a Quechuan word that means "flying serpent" and refers to the Incan deity Amaru.

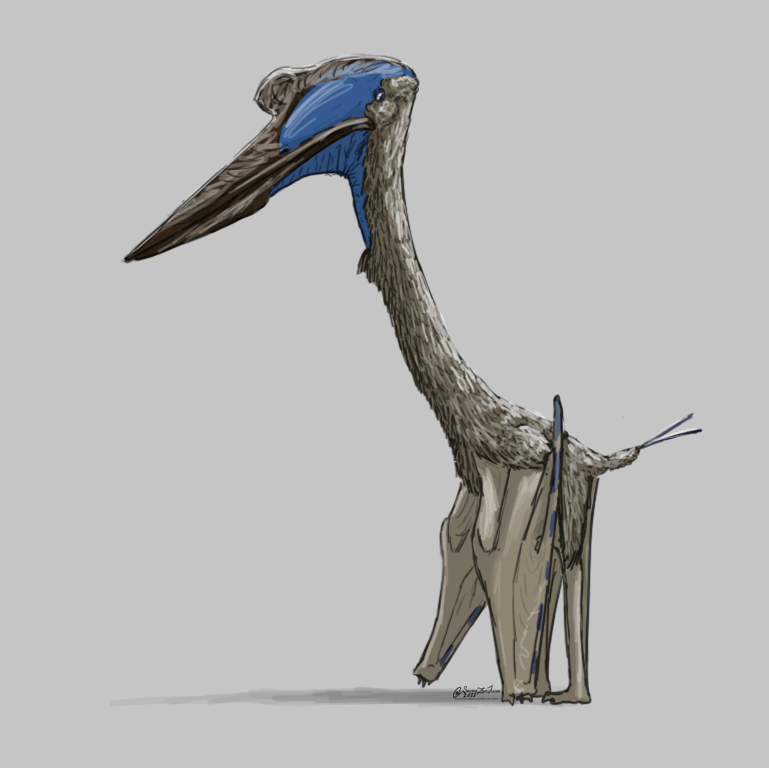
Speculative life restoration

The two known specimens of Thanatosdrakon are the holotype and the paratype, which consist of several well-preserved axial and appendicular bones. The holotype of Thanatosdrakon, specimen UNCUYO-LD 307, consists of a partial postcranial skeleton with around thirty bones, while the paratype, specimen UNCUYO-LD 350, is a complete left humerus. The holotype includes material that has never been previously described in giant azhdarchid pterosaurs, such as a complete notarium, dorsosacral vertebrae and a caudal vertebra. Due to the age of its fossils, Thanatosdrakon is so far the oldest known member of its clade, Quetzalcoatlinae, a subgroup within the larger Azhdarchidae. The discovery of Thanatosdrakon has led to a better understanding of the anatomy and phylogeny of azhdarchids due to its more complete and well-preserved remains, in contrast to the fragmentary and scarce fossils that are usually found in azhdarchid taxa.

== Description ==
Thanatosdrakon was an enormous pterosaur, with its humerus alone, paratype specimen UNCUYO-LD 350, measuring 45 cm (1 ft 6 in). The holotype of Thanatosdrakon, specimen UNCUYO-LD 307, belongs to either a juvenile or a subadult individual. In its description, Ortiz David and colleagues estimated a wingspan of approximately 7 m (23 ft) for the holotype, while a wingspan of approximately 9 m (30 ft) has been estimated for the paratype. These measurements would make Thanatosdrakon the largest known pterosaur from South America. Its axial and appendicular bones are represented and preserved in three dimensions.

== Classification ==
In its description in 2022, Ortiz David and colleagues performed a phylogenetic analysis in which they recovered Thanatosdrakon in the subfamily Quetzalcoatlinae within the family Azhdarchidae. Within Quetzalcoatlinae, they recovered two well-defined clades. The first one consists of the pterosaurs Arambourgiania, Mistralazhdarcho, Aerotitan, Hatzegopteryx, and Albadraco, while the second one consists of Cryodrakon, Quetzalcoatlus, and Thanatosdrakon itself. In this second quetzalcoatline clade, Thanatosdrakon is more specifically recovered as the sister taxon of Quetzalcoatlus. The cladogram below shows the results of the analysis by Ortiz David and colleagues.

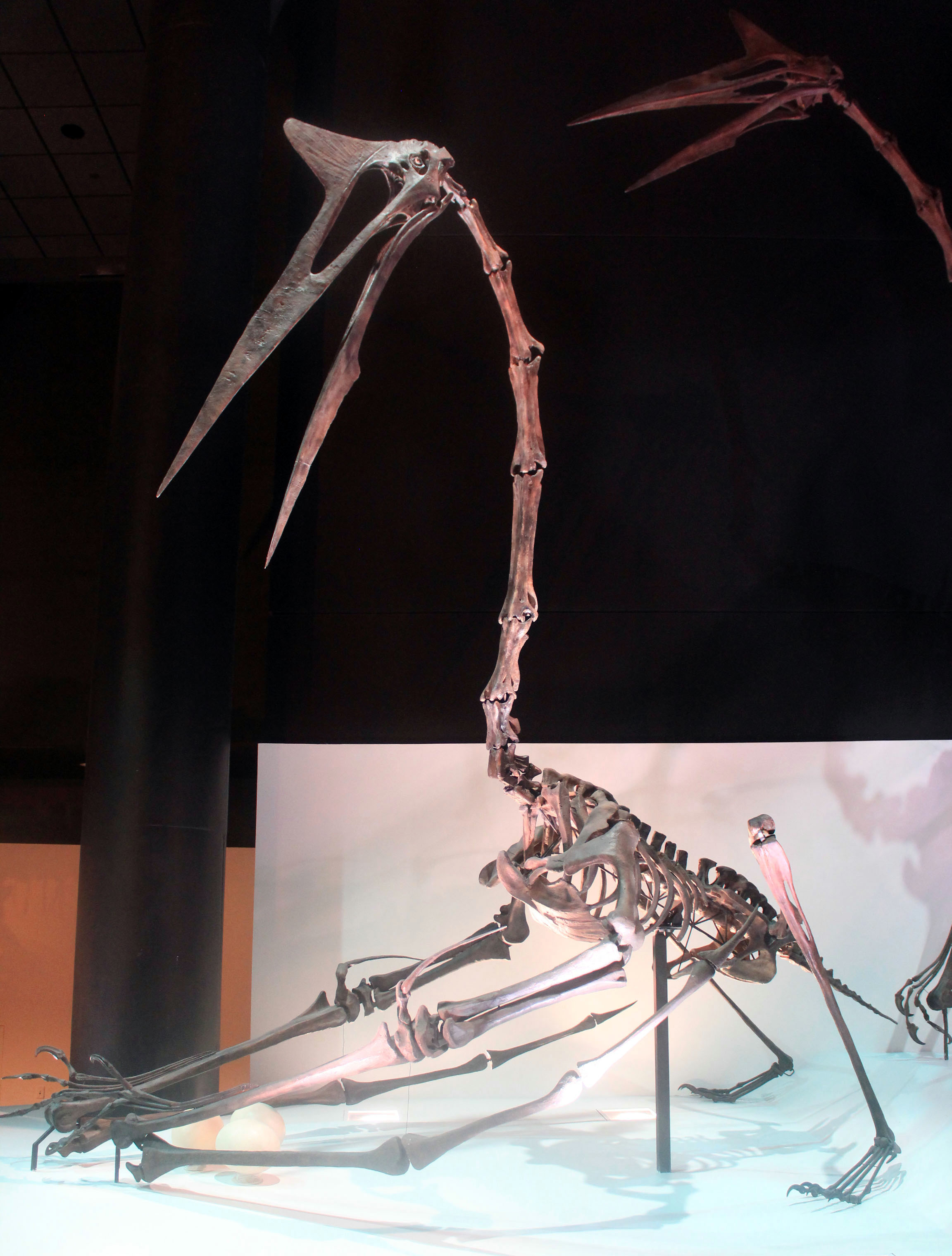
Reconstructed skeleton of the related Quetzalcoatlus from North America

- Azhdarchidae
  - - Eurazhdarcho langendorfensis
    - - Phosphatodraco mauritanicus
      - Aralazhdarcho bostobensis
  - - Zhejiangopterus linhaiensis
    - - Azhdarcho lancicollis
      - Quetzalcoatlinae
        - - - Arambourgiania philadelphiae
            - - Aerotitan sudamericanus
              - Mistralazhdarcho maggii
          - - - Hatzegopteryx thambema
              - Albadraco tharmisensis
        - - Cryodrakon boreas
          - - Thanatosdrakon amaru
            - - Quetzalcoatlus lawsoni
              - - aff. Quetzalcoatlus (FSAC-OB 14)
                - Quetzalcoatlus northropi

== Paleoecology ==
Thanatosdrakon is known from the uppermost levels of the Plottier Formation, which represents a floodplain with ephemeral rivers and consists of mudstone, siltstone, claystone and sandstone, suggesting it lived in a continental environment created by the low-gradient wandering rivers that laid down alluvial deposits across the formation.

In the Plottier Formation, Thanatosdrakon was contemporaneous with an indeterminate abelisaurid, basal coelurosaurian, unenlagiine, aeolosaurin, saltasaurid, and ornithopod, as well as the lithostrotian titanosaurs Antarctosaurus giganteus, Notocolossus, and Petrobrasaurus. Non-dinosaur taxa from the formation include freshwater bivalves, an indeterminate crocodyliforme and mesoeucrocodylian, the chelid turtles Linderochelys and Rionegrochelys, and at least one indeterminate mammal. Ichnotaxa consist of the burrow ichnogenus Scoyenia sp., and insect ichnogenus Taenidium sp.
