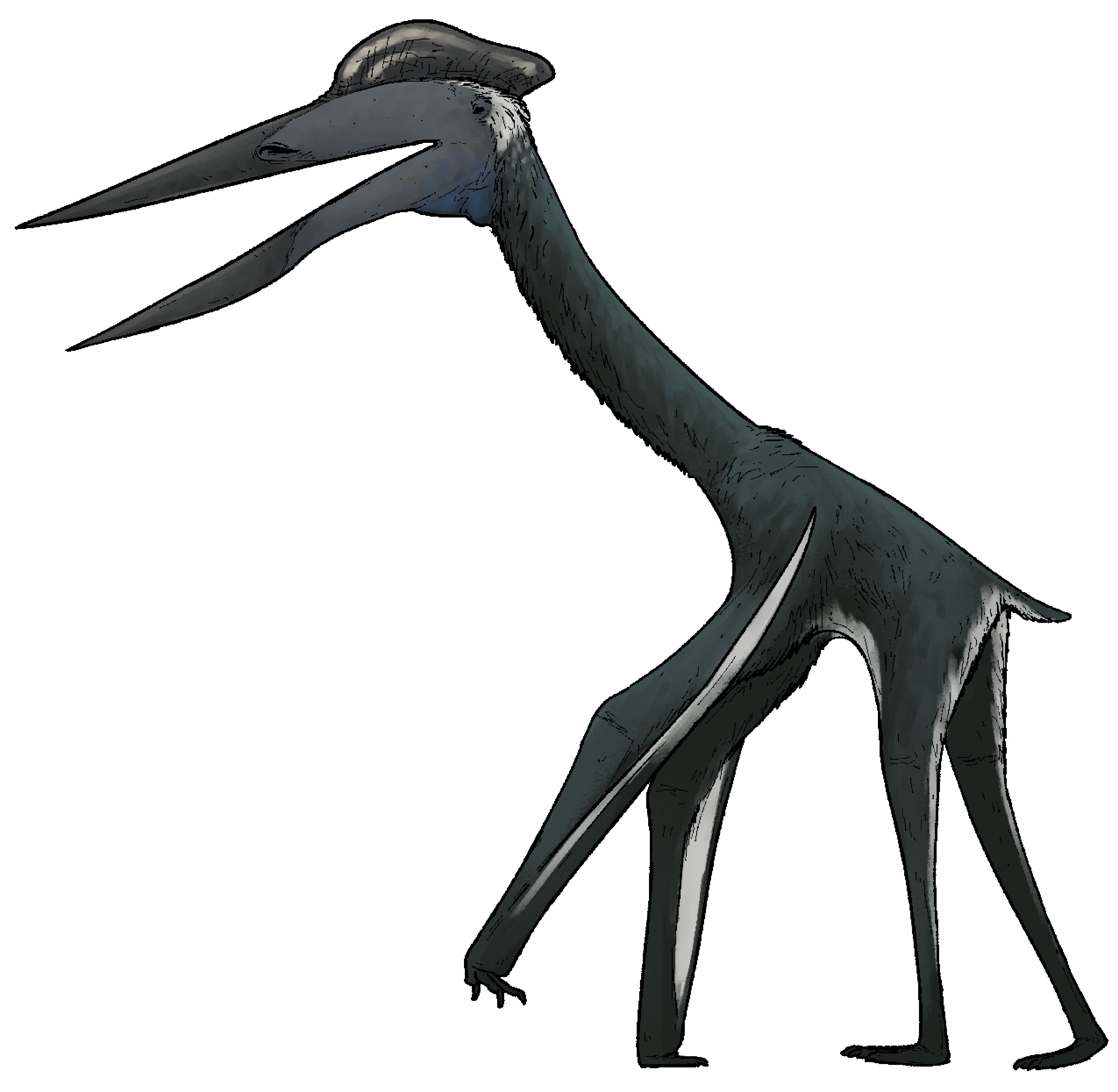
- Speculative life restoration

Scientific classification
- Kingdom: Animalia
- Phylum: Chordata
- Class: Reptilia
- Order: †Pterosauria
- Suborder: †Pterodactyloidea
- Clade: †Azhdarchoidea
- Family: †Azhdarchidae
- Genus: †Albadraco; Solomon et al., 2020

Type species
- †Albadraco tharmisensis Solomon et al., 2020

= Albadraco =

Albadraco Temporal range: Maastrichtian, 66 Ma

Genus of azhdarchid pterosaur from the Late Cretaceous

Albadraco is a genus of azhdarchid pterosaur that lived during the Maastrichtian age of the Late Cretaceous period in what is now Romania. The type species is Albadraco tharmisensis. Its remains, consisting of parts of the snout and a neck vertebra, were found in the Șard Formation, near the city of Alba Iulia in Transylvania. The species was named and described in 2020 by paleontologist Alexandru Solomon and colleagues.

Albadraco is estimated to have had a wingspan ranging from 5 to 6 m (16 to 20 ft) based on its holotype specimen, though adults are speculated to have reached 7 m (23 ft). Albadraco shared its habitat with the much larger pterosaur Hatzegopteryx, both of them belonging to the Azhdarchidae.

== Discovery and naming ==
At the site of Oarda de Jos, near the city of Alba Iulia in Alba County in Transylvania, Romania, two jaw pieces were found of a large pterosaur. The discovery was reported and illustrated in a dissertation by paleontologist Cătălin Jipa-Murzea in 2012.

In 2020, the type species Albadraco tharmisensis was named and described by paleontologists Alexandru Solomon, Vlad Codrea, Márton Venczel and Gerald Grellet-Tinner. The generic name combines a reference to Alba with the Latin draco, "dragon". The specific name refers to a provenance near Tharmis, the ancient Dacian name of Alba Iulia.

The holotype specimen, PSMUBB V651a, b, was found in a layer of the Șard Formation, which dates back to the latest Maastrichtian, about 66 million years ago. It consists of two fused premaxillae of the snout (PSMUBB V651a) and a piece of the symphysis of the lower jaws (PSMUBB V651b). Both parts were assumed to have belonged to a single individual, perhaps a subadult animal. It is the first example from the Cretaceous of Europe of a pterosaur preserving both upper jaw and lower jaw elements.

A second specimen, PSMUBB V652, a fourth cervical (neck) vertebra from the same site, was referred to the species. It too is from a subadult animal and the describing authors considered it possible that it represented the same individual as the holotype.

== Description ==
Based on its holotype, Albadraco is estimated to have had a wingspan of around 5 to 6 m (16 to 20 ft), by extrapolation from the jaw pieces. The adult size was estimated at 6 to 7 m (20 to 23 ft). Albadraco shared its habitat with the much larger Hatzegopteryx, and the possibility was considered that its holotype was only a juvenile exemplar of that pterosaur. This was deemed improbable, however, because the holotype bone structure resembled that of subadult animals, not of fast growing young individuals.

The describers of Albadraco, Solomon and colleagues, indicated five distinguishing traits. They were autapomorphies, unique derived characters. They differ from all other known members of Azhdarchidae, the group to which Albadraco belongs. The cutting edges and sides of the beak show a high foramina density. The premaxilla has split-like foramina on the lower and side surfaces but also two rows of foramina on the side. The snout has a triangular cross-section but its top edge is more rounded than with other azhdarchids. The symphysis of the lower jaws has a U-shaped cross-section in front but a V-shaped one at the rear. The fourth neck vertebra has an elongation ratio (horizontal length divided by transverse width) that is shorter than usual, being more comparable to the elongation ratio of the third neck vertebra in other azhdarchids.

== Classification ==
In its description in 2020, Albadraco was placed in the Azhdarchidae, based on the method of comparative anatomy. A more specific placement was made in a 2021 phylogenetic analysis by American paleontologist Brian Andres, where he found Albadraco in the smaller clade Azhdarchinae, close to the azhdarchids Aerotitan and Mistralazhdarcho. In 2022, a phylogenetic analysis by Argentinian paleontologist Leonardo Ortiz David and colleagues found a different placement for Albadraco. They recovered it within the Quetzalcoatlinae as the sister taxon of Hatzegopteryx, corroborating their relationship as pterosaurs originating from Transylvania.

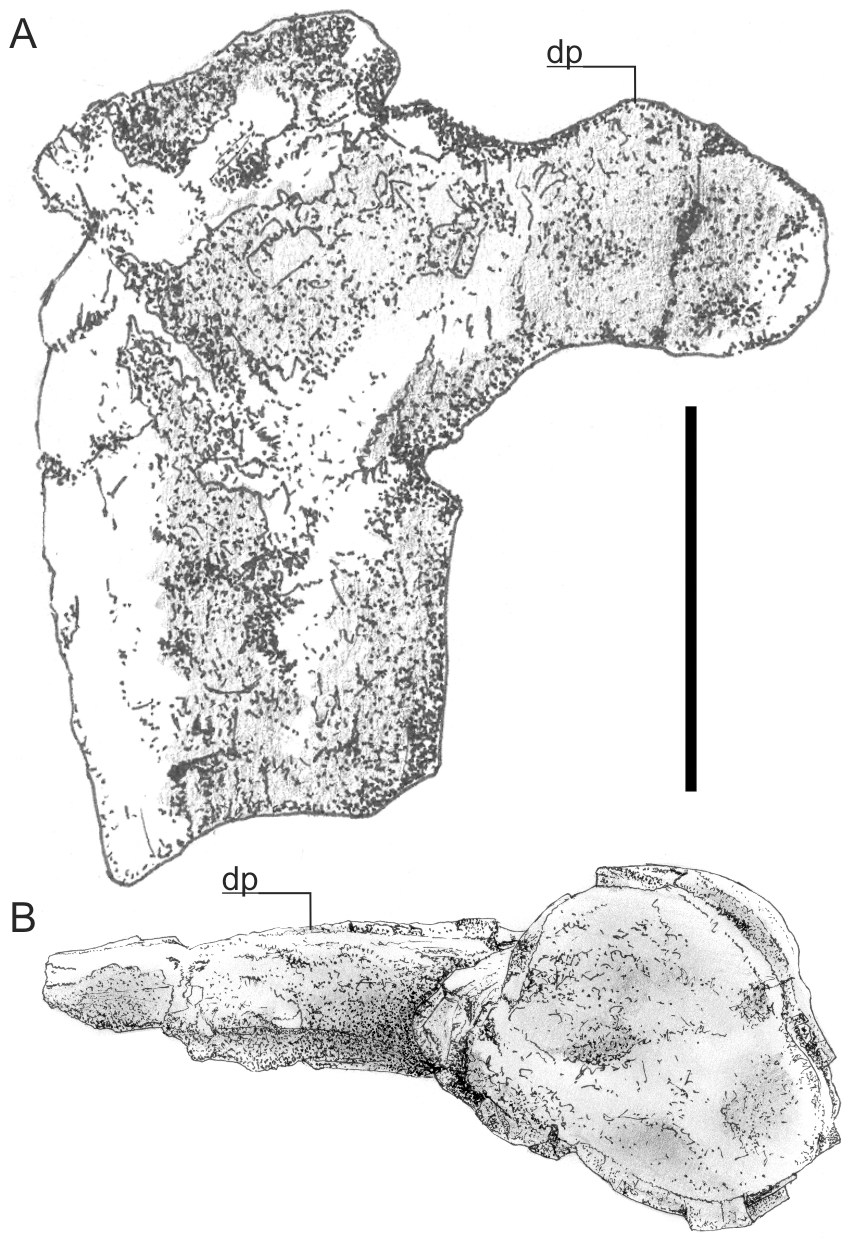
Holotype left humerus of Hatzegopteryx, a fellow Romanian pterosaur and a close relative of Albadraco

Cladogram by Andres (2021).

- Azhdarchidae
  - Azhdarchinae
    - Azhdarcho lancicollis
    - - Albadraco tharmisensis
      - - Aerotitan sudamericanus
        - Mistralazhdarcho maggii
  - Quetzalcoatlinae
    - - Aralazhdarcho bostobensis
      - Phosphatodraco mauritanicus
    - - Eurazhdarcho langendorfensis
      - - Zhejiangopterus linhaiensis
        - - Wellnhopterus brevirostris
          - Cryodrakon boreas
          - - Hatzegopteryx thambema
            - - Arambourgiania philadelphiae
              - - Quetzalcoatlus lawsoni
                - Quetzalcoatlus northropi

Cladogram by Ortiz David and colleagues (2022).

- Azhdarchidae
  - - Eurazhdarcho langendorfensis
    - - Phosphatodraco mauritanicus
      - Aralazhdarcho bostobensis
  - - Zhejiangopterus linhaiensis
    - - Azhdarcho lancicollis
      - Quetzalcoatlinae
        - - - Arambourgiania philadelphiae
            - - Aerotitan sudamericanus
              - Mistralazhdarcho maggii
          - - - Hatzegopteryx thambema
              - Albadraco tharmisensis
        - - Cryodrakon boreas
          - - Thanatosdrakon amaru
            - - Quetzalcoatlus lawsoni
              - - aff. Quetzalcoatlus (FSAC-OB 14)
                - Quetzalcoatlus northropi

== See also ==
- Timeline of pterosaur research
