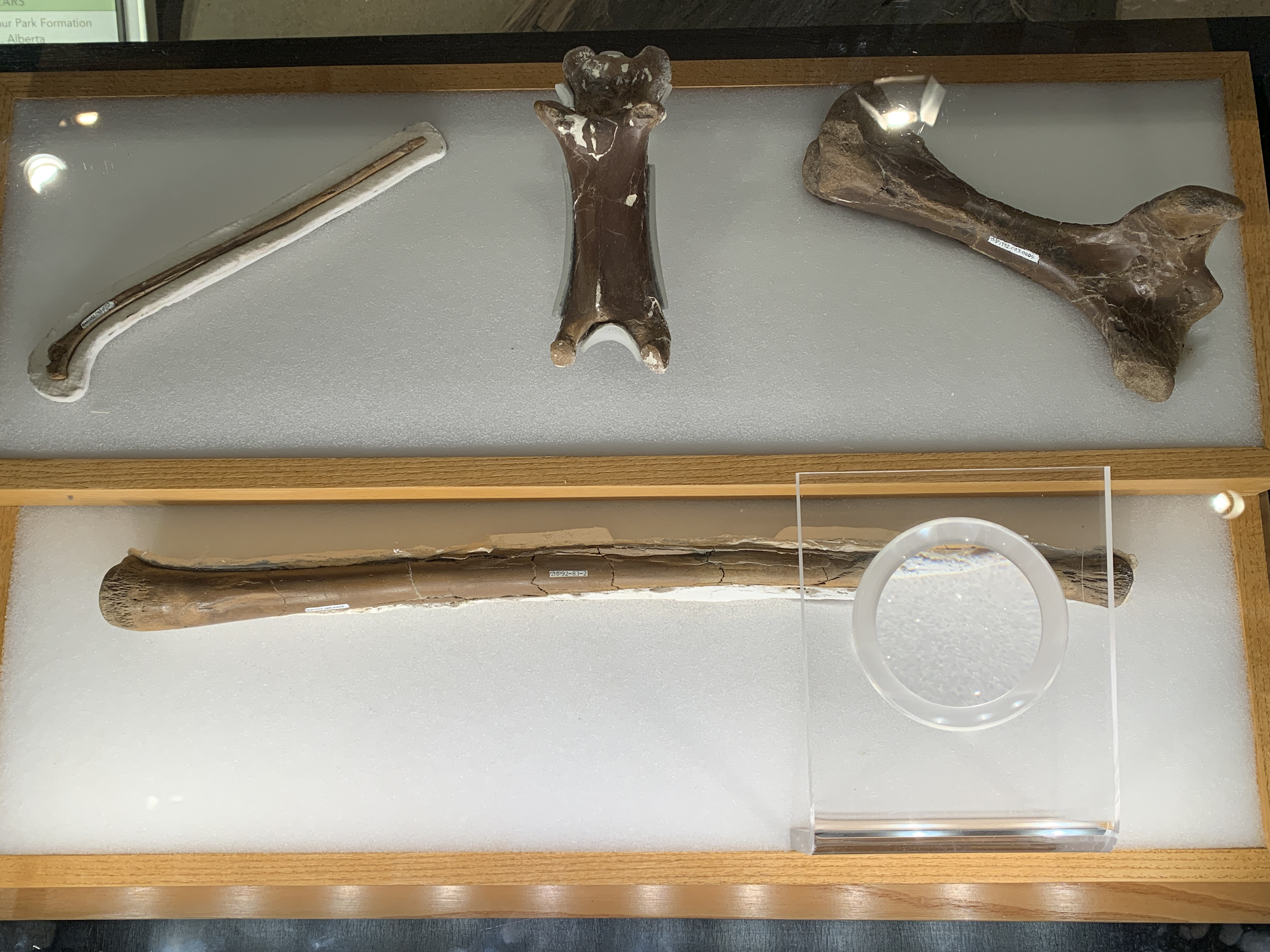
- The holotype specimen consists of a wingbone (upper left), a fourth neck vertebra (middle top), a left humerus (upper right), and a tibia (bottom)

Scientific classification
- Kingdom: Animalia
- Phylum: Chordata
- Class: Reptilia
- Order: †Pterosauria
- Suborder: †Pterodactyloidea
- Clade: †Azhdarchoidea
- Family: †Azhdarchidae
- Subfamily: †Quetzalcoatlinae
- Genus: †Cryodrakon; Hone et al., 2019
- Species: †C. boreas

Binomial name
- †Cryodrakon boreas Hone et al., 2019

= Cryodrakon =

Cryodrakon Temporal range: Campanian, 76.7–74.3 Ma

Genus of large azhdarchid pterosaur from the Late Cretaceous

Cryodrakon is a genus of azhdarchid pterosaur that lived during the late Campanian age of the Late Cretaceous period in what is now Canada, around 76.7 and 74.3 million years ago. Starting in 1972, fossil remains of large azhdarchid pterosaurs have been reported from Alberta. Paleontologists assigned them to the genus Quetzalcoatlus, given that it was the only known azhdarchid from North America back then and because they had limited information about its actual remains, so they simply could not deduce anything different. In 1992, a partial pterosaur skeleton was uncovered in the Dinosaur Park Formation of Alberta. It was partially described in 1995 by paleontologist Philip J. Currie and colleagues, with a subsequent and more complete description in 2005. But it was not until 2019 that it received a new genus and type species, Cryodrakon boreas, named and described by paleontologists David Hone, Michael Habib, and François Therrien. The partial skeleton was made the holotype specimen of this new pterosaur. Its generic name means "cold dragon" in Ancient Greek, in reference to its Canadian origin, while its specific name refers to the Greek god of the north winds, Boreas. All azhdarchid remains from the Dinosaur Park Formation were subsequently referred to Cryodrakon.

Most of the fossil remains of Cryodrakon belong to either young or subadult individuals, from which a wingspan of about 5 m (16 ft) could be estimated. However, much larger fossils have been unearthed, including an incomplete fifth cervical (neck) vertebra that measures 40 cm (1 ft 4 in). If complete, it could have measured at least 50 cm (1 ft 8 in). Adult individuals of Cryodrakon would have had a similar size to Quetzalcoatlus northropi based on the size of its fossils. A wingspan of about 10 m (33 ft) is the most commonly estimated for Cryodrakon, which makes it one of the largest flying animals to ever exist.

In its description, Cryodrakon was assigned to family Azhdarchidae, which includes the already mentioned Quetzalcoatlus. A phylogenetic analysis was not performed due to the fragmentary nature of its remains, but the describers pointed out certain features that would exclude Cryodrakon from being in a basal (primitive) position within Azhdarchidae. Subsequent phylogenetic analyses would place it within the subfamily Quetzalcoatlinae, though in varying position depending on the study. Cryodrakon would have coexisted with many different types of dinosaurs in the Dinosaur Park Formation, as demonstrated by the abundance of dinosaur fossils found there.

== Etymology ==
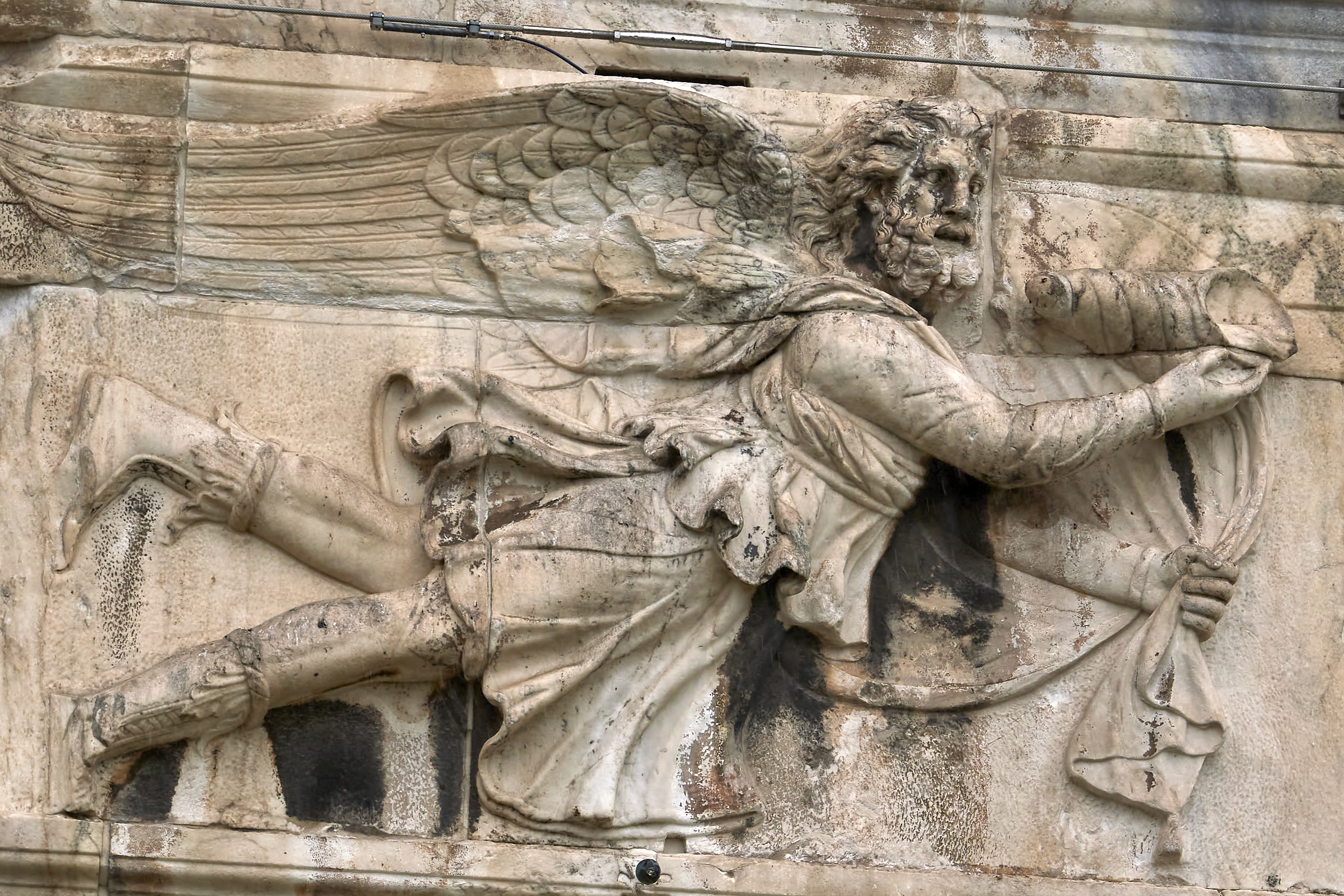
The specific name of Cryodrakon refers to the Greek god of the north wind, Boreas

The generic name Cryodrakon is derived from the Ancient Greek words κρύος (kryos, meaning "cold") and δράκων (drakon, meaning "dragon"), while the specific name boreas refers to the Greek god the north wind, Boreas. Hence, Cryodrakon boreas could be translated as "cold dragon of the north winds". Habib had previously considered the name Cryodrakon viserion, as a reference to the ice dragon in Game of Thrones.

== Discovery and history ==
Since 1972, bones of large pterosaurs (flying reptiles) belonging to the family Azhdarchidae have been reported from Alberta. These were the first pterosaur fossils discovered in Canada. They were sometimes referred to as Quetzalcoatlus sp., indicating an uncertain species of Quetzalcoatlus, or were just assigned to Quetzalcoatlus without specifying anything. During the late 20th century Paleontologists who uncovered large Cretaceous azhdarchid remains in North America would provisionally assign them to Quetzalcoatlus, due to it being the only known azhdarchid from North America at the time and information about its anatomy being limited. Later research by American paleontologist Michael Habib would indicate that these fossil remains represented a taxon that was new to science.

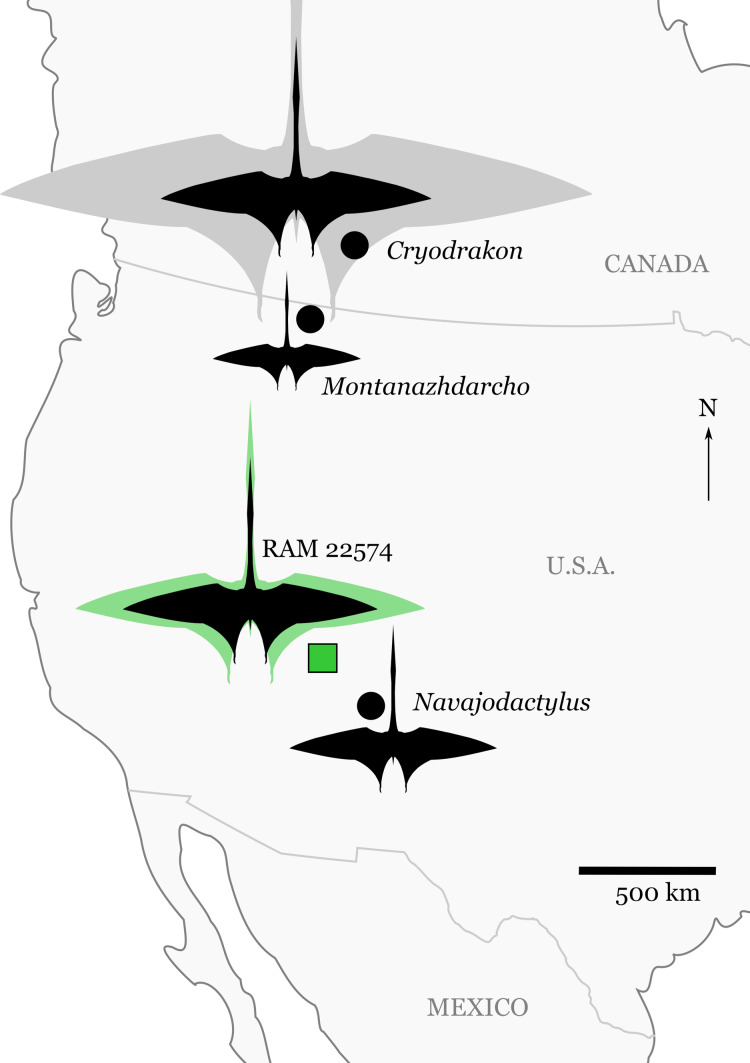
Location of the discovery of Cryodrakon (top; Canada)

In 1992, a partial pterosaur skeleton was found and excavated in Upper Cretaceous strata of Dinosaur Provincial Park in Alberta, more precisely in a layer of the Dinosaur Park Formation that dated back to the late Campanian (between 76.7 and 74.3 million years ago). The excavation site was located near the lower or older boundary of this range. It was subsequently reported and partially described by multiple paleontologists, including Canadian paleontologist Philip J. Currie, in 1995. They noticed that the bones had tooth marks and even a broken tip of a tooth imbedded in one of them, most likely coming from Saurornitholestes langstoni of the same formation. The bones of the skeleton were not articulated, but associated, representing an immature animal. This is the only pterosaur found in Canada with fossil remains that consist of more than just a single bone so far. Due to the skeleton's initial description only being partial, a more detailed description of was made in 2005 by Currie and Eva Koppelhus. This partial skeleton, specimen TMP 1992.83, lacks the skull and consists of a fourth cervical (neck) vertebra, a rib, a humerus, a pteroid bone, a fourth metacarpal, a tibia and a metatarsal.

In 2019, specimen TMP 1992.83 received a new separate genus and type species, Cryodrakon boreas, and became the holotype of this new pterosaur. Cryodrakon boreas was named and described by paleontologists David Hone, François Therrien, and Michael Habib.

Through comparisons with other azhdarchid taxa, Hone and colleagues concluded that all azhdarchid material from Alberta could be referred to a single distinct taxon. Therefore, they assigned all the known azhdarchid remains from the Dinosaur Park Formation to Cryodrakon boreas. The specimens consisted of numerous cervical vertebrae, a scapulocoracoid, an ulna, several fourth metacarpals, wing finger phalanges and a femur. These bones represent individuals of various biological ages, among them juveniles and a large mature exemplar. However, most of the bones are from medium-sized individuals. In their 2019 study, only the cervical vertebrae were described in detail, since bones from other parts of the body had already been treated in 2005.

== Description ==
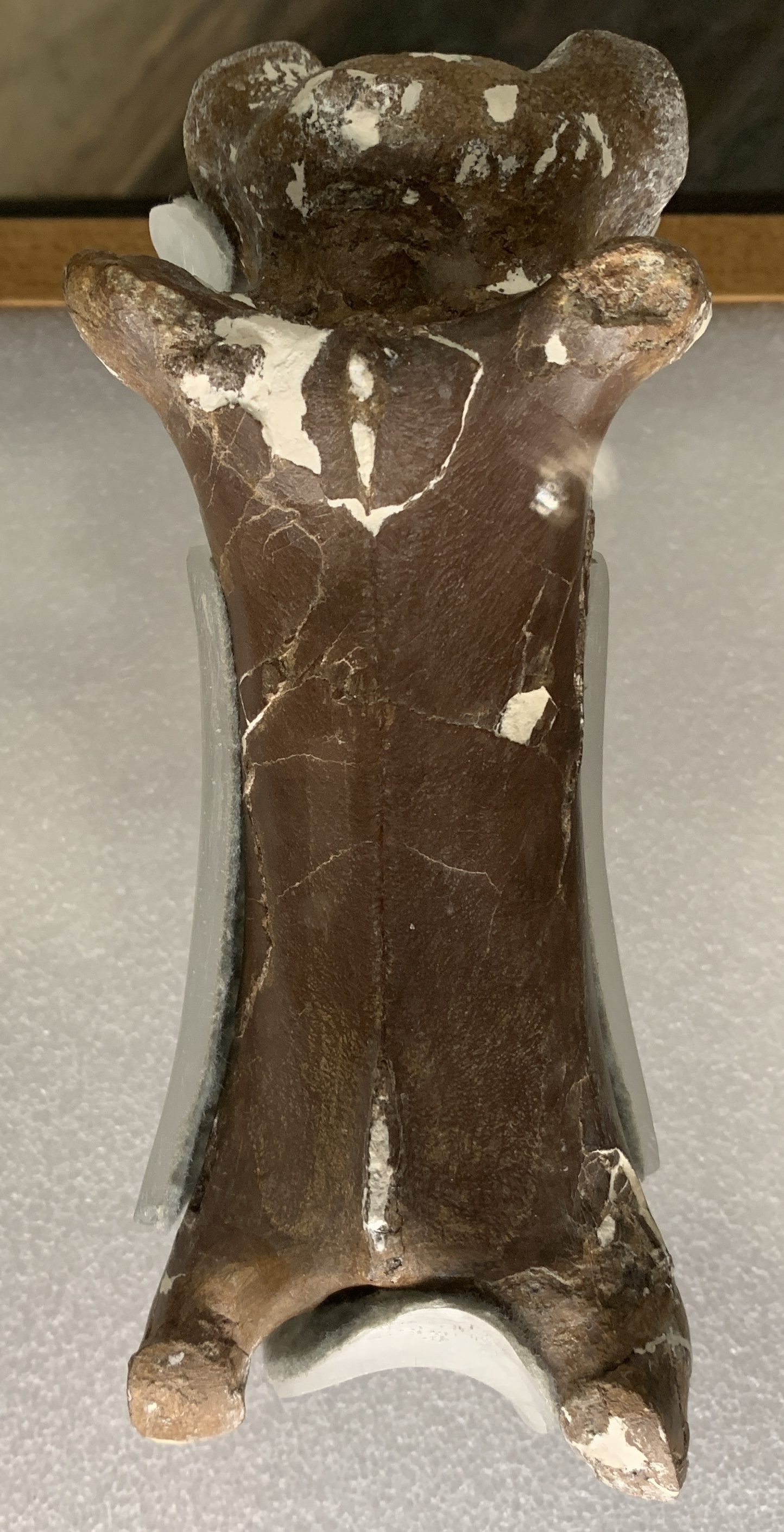
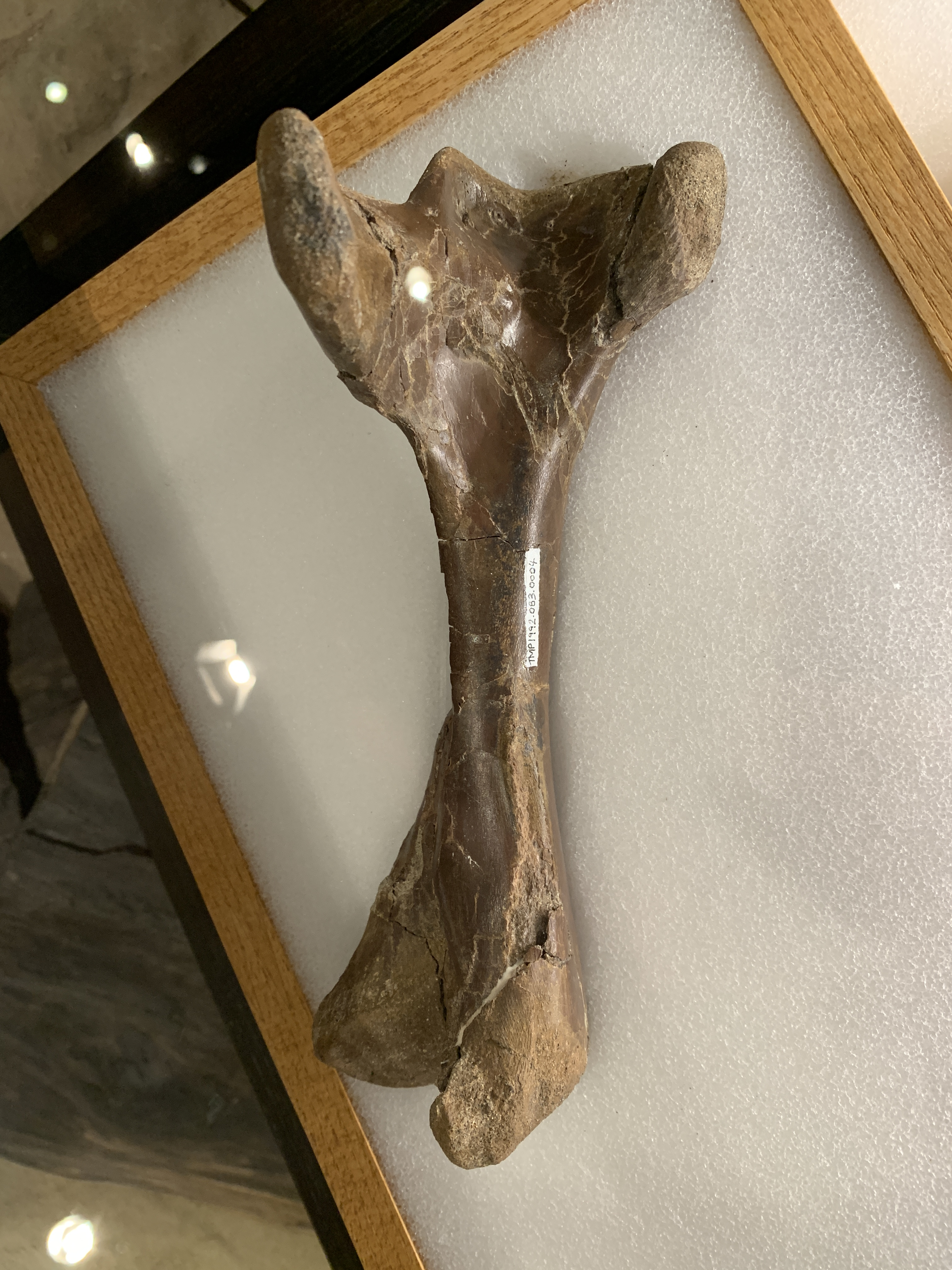
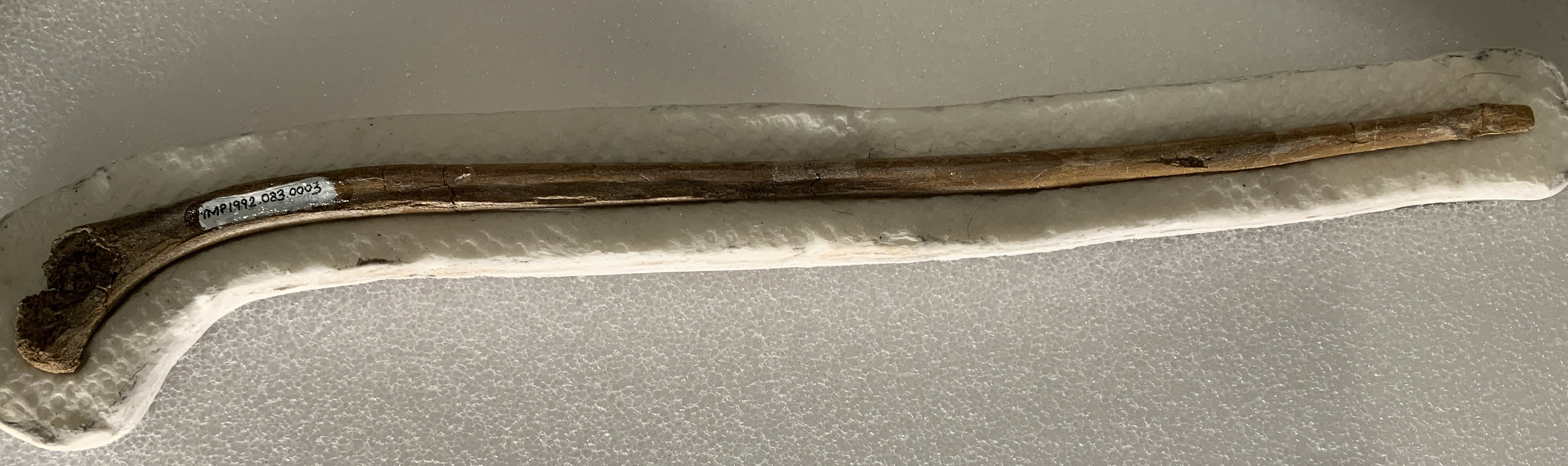
Close-up view of the holotype fourth neck vertebra (left), left humerus (right), and wingbone (bottom). On display at the Royal Tyrrell Museum.

The majority of the fossil remains of Cryodrakon, among them its holotype bones, most likely represented young and subadult individuals. Their dimensions are similar to those of Quetzalcoatlus sp. (now known as the species Q. lawsoni). A wingspan of at least 5 m (16 ft) has been set for Cryodrakon based on these smaller remains. Q. lawsoni is estimated to have had a similar wingspan of around 4.5 to 5 m (15 to 16 ft). However, the remaining azhdarchid material from the Dinosaur Park Formation that was assigned to Cryodrakon by Hone and colleagues indicates many individuals of varying size, from specimens less than half the size of Q. lawsoni to others that double it. For example, specimen TMP 1996.12.369, a fifth cervical vertebra with a length of only 10.6 mm (0.42 in), is from a juvenile Cryodrakon, which was given an estimated wingspan of about 2 m (6 ft 7 in). At the same time, specimen TMP 1980.16.1367 is an incomplete fifth cervical vertebra with a preserved length of 40 cm (1 ft 4 in), which is estimated to have been at least 50 cm (1 ft 8 in) if complete. It presumably belonged to an adult individual. This specimen was originally described in 1982 by Currie and Dale Russell. They assigned it to Quetzalcoatlus northropi and mistakenly identified it as a femur. A wingspan of 13 m (43 ft) was estimated. However, nowadays, wingspan estimates for Q. northropi have been more moderate, at around 10 to 11 m (33 to 36 ft), which would still make it one of the largest flying animals to ever exist.

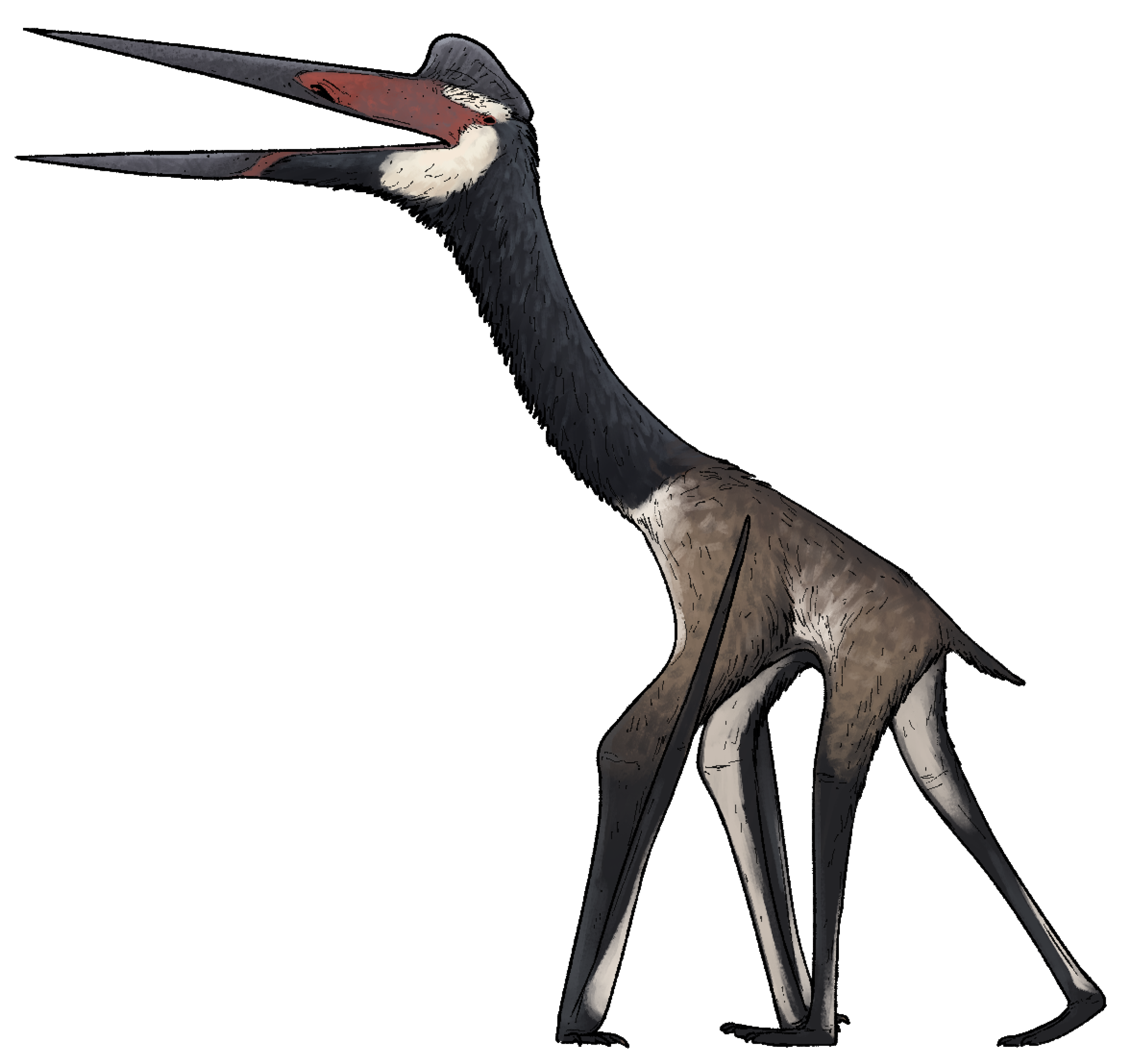
Life reconstruction of Cryodrakon boreas.

A fully-grown Cryodrakon would have most likely been of similar size to Q. northropi, based on the size of its remains. A wingspan of about 10 m (33 ft) has been estimated for adult individuals. In his 2022 book about pterosaurs, American paleontologist Gregory S. Paul had also set the same wingspan measurement for Cryodrakon. This would make it one of the largest known flying animals as well. The previously mentioned specimen TMP 1980.16.1367 of Cryodrakon is also comparable in size to the holotype of Arambourgiania, which measured around 60 cm (1 ft 11.62 in), indicating that Cryodrakon would have also been of similar size to this pterosaur. Initial wingspan estimates of Arambourgiania ranged from 11 to 13 m (36 to 43 ft), but more recent estimates have been more moderate, ranging from 8 to 10 m (26 to 33 ft), mostly due to the fragmentary nature of its remains. This would make Arambourgiania equal to or even slightly smaller in size than Cryodrakon.

In terms of body structure, Cryodrakon was proportionally similar to Quetzalcoatlus and other long-necked advanced members of the Azhdarchidae, though its somewhat more robust bones may indicate that it was slightly heavier.

Cryodrakon is distinguished from all other known azhdarchids by two features of its neck vertebrae. The lateral pneumatic fossae or pneumatophores, a pair of small openings leading to air pockets on either side of the neural canal, were positioned near the lower edge of the neural canal, while those of other azhdarchids (with the purported exception of Eurazhdarcho) were positioned higher up. The second distinguishing feature is related to its postexapophyses, large bony knobs adjacent to the protruding rear connection surface of each vertebra, the cotyle. The postexapophyses of Cryodrakon were prominent in width but short in length, clearly separated from the cotyle, and their facets were directed downwards.

== Classification ==
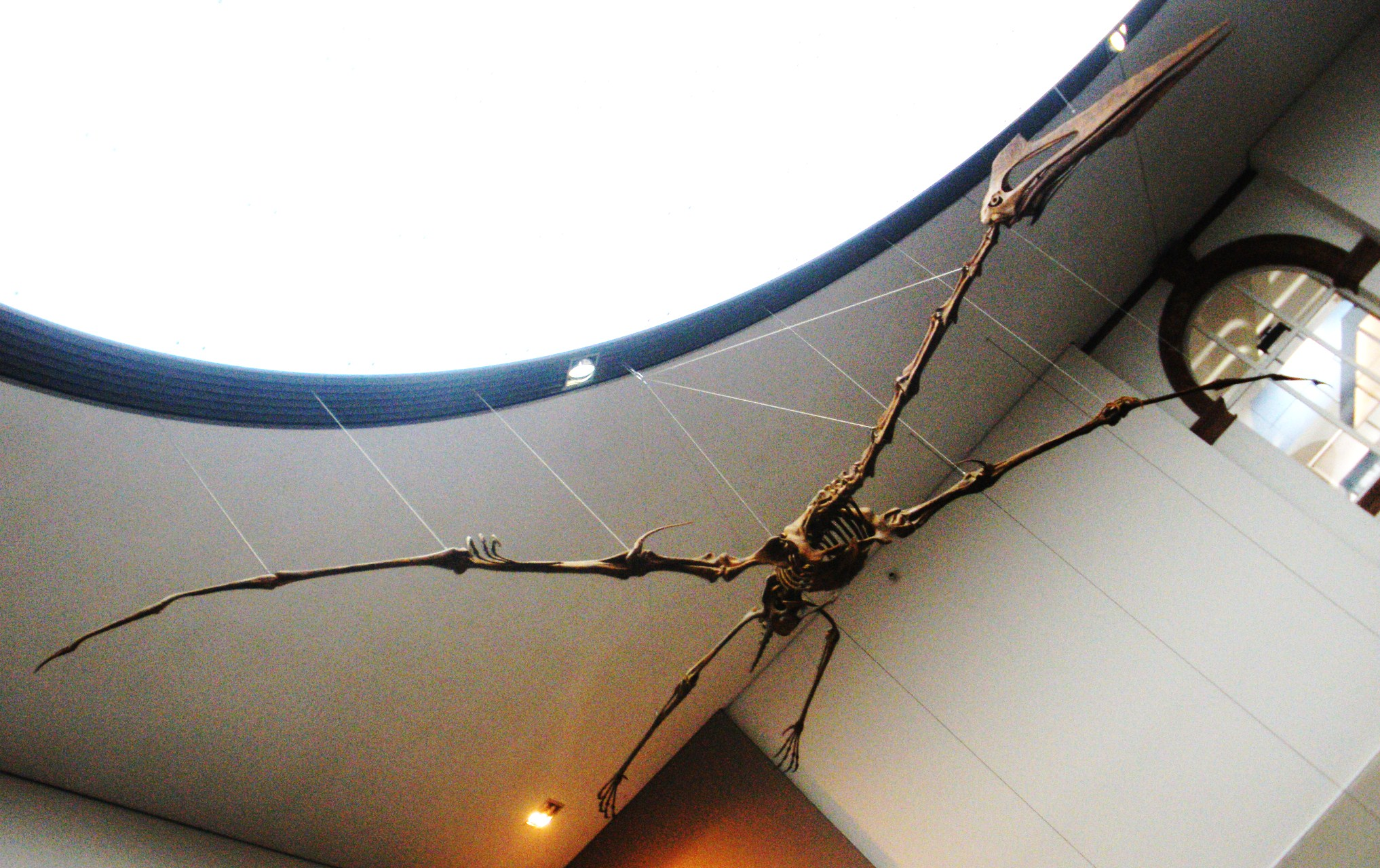
The related Quetzalcoatlus was the pterosaur to which all azhdarchid remains from the Dinosaur Park Formation were once referred

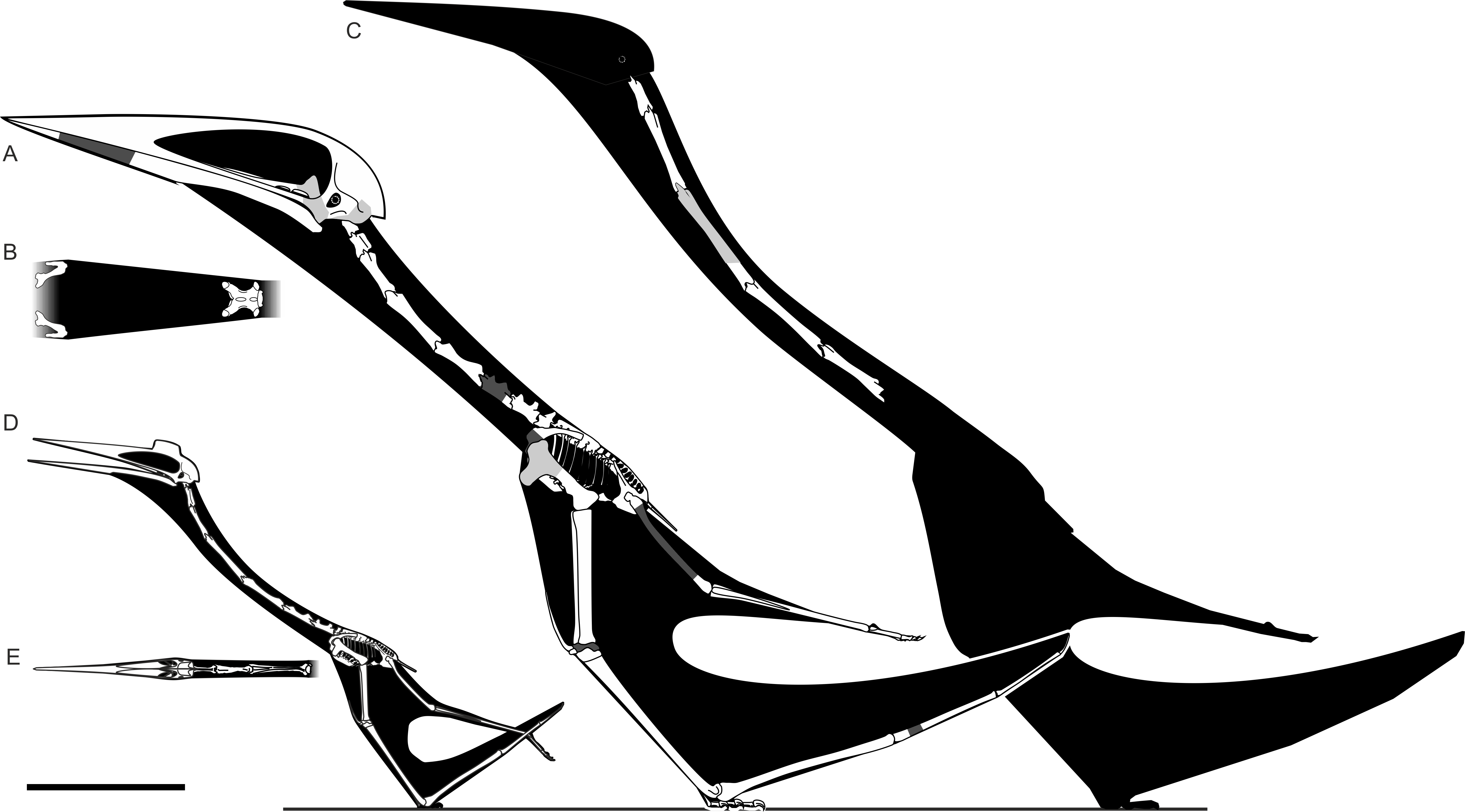
Skeletal reconstructions of related azhdarchids Hatzegopteryx (A), Arambourgiania (C), and Quetzalcoatlus lawsoni (D), with known parts in gray

In its description, Hone and colleagues placed Cryodrakon in the family Azhdarchidae. No exact cladistic analysis had been given to clarify its precise relationship with other azhdarchids. However, the describers were confident that it did not belong in the basalmost (most primitive) position within Azhdarchidae due to the lack of distinct cervical zygapophyses in its middle cervicals. Additionally, based on the geological age of its fossil remains, Cryodrakon would have been one of the oldest known North American azhdarchids. In 2021, American paleontologist Brian Andres performed a phylogenetic analysis on Quetzalcoatlus, in which he included Cryodrakon. He recovered Cryodrakon in a derived (advanced) position in the subfamily Quetzalcoatlinae within Azhdarchidae. Cryodrakon formed a trichotomy with Wellnhopterus and a clade containing the quetzalcoatlines Hatzegopteryx, Arambourgiania, and Quetzalcoatlus. His analysis is shown in the first cladogram below. In 2023, a study by paleontologist Rubi Pêgas et al. also recovered Cryodrakon within Quetzalcoatlinae, but differed from Andres in its specific position within the subfamily. In her analysis, she found Cryodrakon as the basalmost member of Quetzalcoatlinae. her study is shown in the second cladogram below.

Topology 1: Andres (2021).

- Azhdarchidae
  - Azhdarchinae
    - Azhdarcho lancicollis
    - - Albadraco tharmisensis
      - - Aerotitan sudamericanus
        - Mistralazhdarcho maggii
  - Quetzalcoatlinae
    - - Aralazhdarcho bostobensis
      - Phosphatodraco mauritanicus
    - - Eurazhdarcho langendorfensis
      - - Zhejiangopterus linhaiensis
        - - Wellnhopterus brevirostris
          - Cryodrakon boreas
          - - Hatzegopteryx thambema
            - - Arambourgiania philadelphiae
              - - Quetzalcoatlus lawsoni
                - Quetzalcoatlus northropi

Topology 2: Pêgas et al. (2023).

- Azhdarchidae
  - - Eurazhdarcho langendorfensis
    - - Phosphatodraco mauritanicus
      - Wellnhopterus brevirostris
      - Aralazhdarcho bostobensis
  - - Zhejiangopterus linhaiensis
    - - Azhdarcho lancicollis
      - Quetzalcoatlinae
        - Cryodrakon boreas
        - - - Hatzegopteryx thambema
            - Albadraco tharmisensis
          - - - Quetzalcoatlus northropi
              - Quetzalcoatlus lawsoni
              - Quetzalcoatlus sp. (FSAC-OB 14)
            - - Mistralazhdarcho maggii
              - Aerotitan sudamericanus
              - Arambourgiania philadelphiae

== Paleobiology ==
Cryodrakon is thought to have been capable of flight, which would make it one of the largest flying animals known to have existed, just like Quetzalcoatlus. Azhdarchid pterosaurs similar to Cryodrakon are currently thought to have fed by hunting for smaller animals while on the ground, similar to modern day marabou storks.

Some specimens of Cryodrakon show signs of being eaten by other archosaurs, either due to predation or scavenging. The holotype partial skeleton of Cryodrakon was found to have been scavenged by a dromaeosaurid, possibly Saurornitholestes langstoni. Aside from tooth marks, a broken tooth was found in one of the bones, which, according to the authors, meant that the thin-walled bone of Cryodrakon "must have been very tough." In 2025, a fifth cervical vertebra of a juvenile Cryodrakon (TMP 2023.012.0237) showed probable bite marks from either Champsosaurus, Leidyosuchus, Albertochampsa, a Stangerochampsa-like taxon, or possibly Eodelphis.

== Paleoenvironment ==
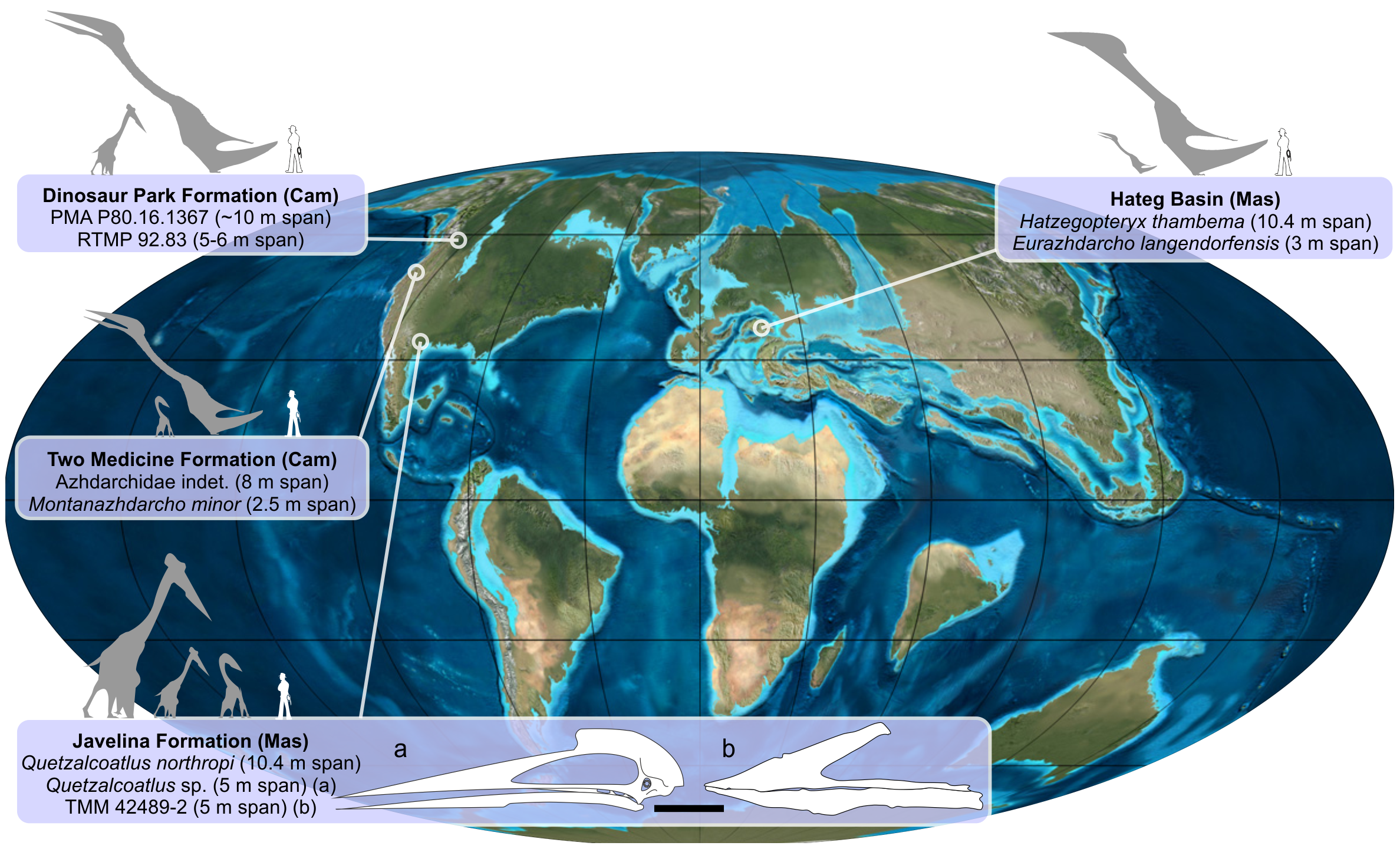
Map showing global distribution of azhdarchids, with Cryodrakon in the upper left

The Dinosaur Park Formation, where fossils of Cryodrakon have been excavated, preserves many fossils from alluvial and coastal plain environments. Both of these environments would have experienced high precipitation, warm temperatures, and high humidity, with conditions becoming more swamp-like as time progressed. There was a great diversity of herbivorous dinosaurs including both lambeosaurine and saurolophine hadrosaurs, centrosaurine and chasmosaurine ceratopsians, and nodosaurid and ankylosaurid ankylosaurs, which could have been able to feed on different vegetation levels from one another. The predatory niches were occupied by small maniraptoran theropods (including dromaeosaurids and troodontids), medium-sized juvenile tyrannosaurids, and fully grown tyrannosaurids.

== See also ==
- Timeline of pterosaur research
