= Fossil collecting =

Collecting fossils to study, collect or sell

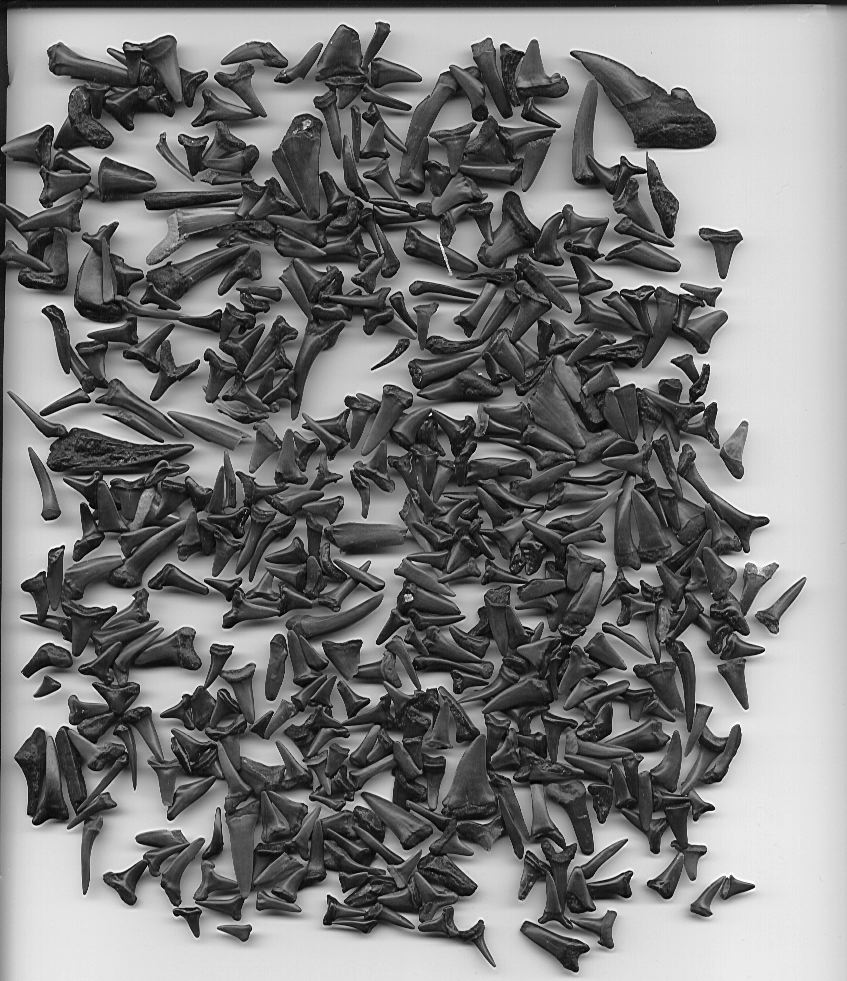
Collecting fossilized shark's teeth is an easy way to begin collecting fossils. They are often found in abundance on public beaches. The teeth shown here were collected in Castle Hayne, North Carolina, and are from the Eocene and Cretaceous divisions.

Fossil collecting (sometimes, in a non-scientific sense, fossil hunting) is the collection of the fossils for scientific study, hobby, or profit. Fossil collecting, as practiced by amateurs, is the predecessor of modern paleontology and many still collect fossils and study fossils as amateurs. Professionals and amateurs alike collect fossils for their scientific value. A commercial trade in fossils has long existed, with some of this being practiced illegally.

== Process ==
=== Locating fossils ===
==== Rock type ====
Fossils are generally found in sedimentary rock with differentiated strata representing a succession of deposited material. The occurrence of fossil bearing material depends on environmental factors before and after the time of preservation. After death, the first preserving factor is a rapid burial in water bodies or terrestrial sediment which would help preserve the specimen. These rocks are usually termed clastic rocks and are further divided into fine, medium and coarse grained material. Fossils can be found in all grain types, but more detailed specimens are found in the fine grained material. A second type of burial is the non-clastic rock, where the rock is made up of the precipitation of compacted fossil material. Types of non-clastic rock include limestone and coal. The third fossil bearing material is the evaporates, which precipitate out of concentrated dissolved salts to form nodular deposits. Examples include rock salt and phosphate concentrations. The evaporates are usually associated with gastropod, algae, vertebrate, and trace fossils. Fossils are not found in areas of igneous rock (except in some beds between lava flows). In rocks which have undergone metamorphism, fossils are generally so distorted that they are difficult to recognize or have been destroyed completely.

==== Preservation ====
After burial, various factors are at work that can endanger the current fossil's preserved state. Chemical alteration can change the mineral composition of the fossil, but not its appearance. Lithification can distort its appearance; the fossil may be fully or partially dissolved leaving only a fossil mold.

==== Exposure ====
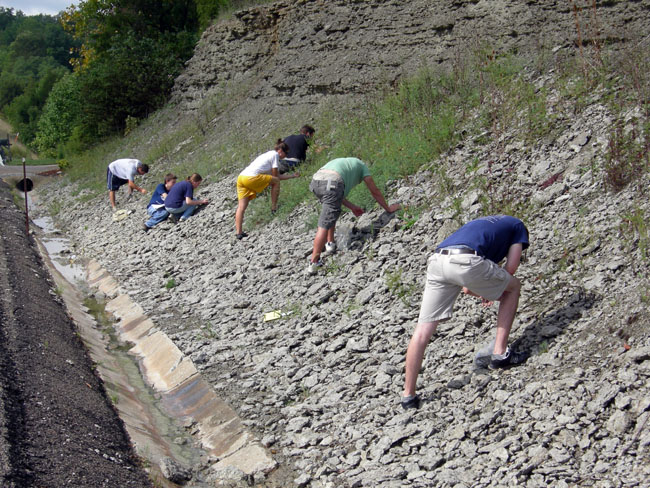
College students collecting fossils as part of their invertebrate paleontology course. This is a roadside outcrop of Ordovician limestones and shales in southeastern Indiana.

Areas where sedimentary rocks are being eroded include exposed mountainous areas, river banks and beds, wave washed sea cliffs, and engineering features like quarries and road cuts. Coal mining operations often yield excellent fossil plants. The best ones are found not in the coal itself but in the associated sedimentary rock deposits called coal measures.

Wave-washed sea cliffs and foreshore exposures are often good places to search for fossils, but always be aware of the state of the tides in the area. Never take chances by climbing high cliffs of crumbling rock or clay (many have died attempting it). Dried up natural lake beds and caves in the form of pitfall traps frequently have high concentrations of fossils (e.g., Cuddie Springs and Naracoorte Caves in Australia).

Most fossils have either a different colour from the surrounding rock (due to the differing mineral composition), a differing shape or texture, or a combination of both. A fossil can be extracted from its environment with a similar colour to the surrounding rock it was found in.

=== Collecting techniques ===
2012 VOA report about the amateur fossil collector Ray Stanford

Fossil collecting techniques vary depending on the rock in which the fossils are found. For collecting in hard rock, a geologist's hammer, a variety of cold chisels, and a mallet are used to split and break rocks to reveal fossils. Because the rock is deposited in layers, these layers may be split apart to reveal fossils. For soft sediments and unconsolidated deposits such as sands, silts, and clays, a spade, flat-bladed trowel, and stiff brushes are used. Sieves in a variety of mesh sizes are used to separate fossils from sands and gravels. Sieving is a rougher technique for collecting fossils and can destroy fragile ones. Sometimes, water is run through a sieve to help remove silt and sand. This technique is called wet sieving. Many types of fossils can be found and collected without tools as erosion can reveal them completely, especially near bodies of flowing water.

Fossils tend to be fragile and are not usually extracted entirely from the surrounding rock. Cloth, cotton, small boxes and aluminum foil are frequently used to protect fossils from damage while being transported. Occasionally, large fragile specimens may need to be protected and supported using a jacket of plaster before their removal from the rock. If a fossil is left in situ, a cast may be produced using plaster of paris or latex. Such a cast is inexpensive, easier to transport, causes less damage to the environment, and leaves the fossil in place for others to examine (though it does not preserve every detail). Fossilized tracks are frequently documented with casts. Subtle fossils which are preserved solely as impressions in sandy layers, such as the Ediacaran fossils, are also usually documented by means of a cast, which shows detail more clearly than the rock itself.

=== Preparation and cleaning ===
For smaller fossils, a stiff brush is sometimes used to dust and clean the fossil. For larger fossils, a chisel can be used to remove large bits of dirt. However, this runs the risk of damaging the fossil. Running water can cause some types of fossils to either dislodge from the rock or even crumble and break apart, for they are very fragile. Dental tools are sometimes used to remove small amounts of rock from the fossil.

=== Documentation ===
A knowledge of the precise location a fossil is essential if the fossil is to have any scientific value. Details of the parent rock strata, the location of the find, and other fossil material associated with the find help scientists to place the fossil in the context of the time, location and situation in which the organism died. Data logs, photographs, and sketches may accompany detailed field notes to assist in the locating of a fossiliferous outcrop. Individual fossils are ideally cataloged with a locality number and a unique specimen number. This allows for a collection to be easily searched and for specimens to be located. Cataloging of collections is almost universal in large institutions like museums.

== Collecting ethics ==
There are various laws that must be observed in order to collect fossils. Permission should be sought before collection begins on private land. Hammering the rocks in national parks and other areas of natural beauty is often discouraged and in most cases illegal.

The first expressly worded fossil-collecting code was published from the museum-home of pioneering geologist Hugh Miller at Cromarty on the Highland east coast of Scotland on 11 April 2008. It was introduced by Michael Russell, Minister for Environment, Scotland, as part of celebrations honouring the bicentennial of the founding of the Geological Society of London. The code supplements an existing draft drawn up by English Nature.

The code advises fossil collectors to seek permission from landowners, to collect responsibly, to record details, to seek advice on finding unusual fossils, to label the specimens, and to care for them. Its principles established a framework of advice on best practices in the collection, identification, conservation and storage of fossil specimens.

The non-binding code of ethics for this field was drawn up by Scottish Natural Heritage (SNH) following many months of consultation with fossil collectors, landowners, palaeontological researchers, and staff of Scotland's museums.

=== Fossil trade ===
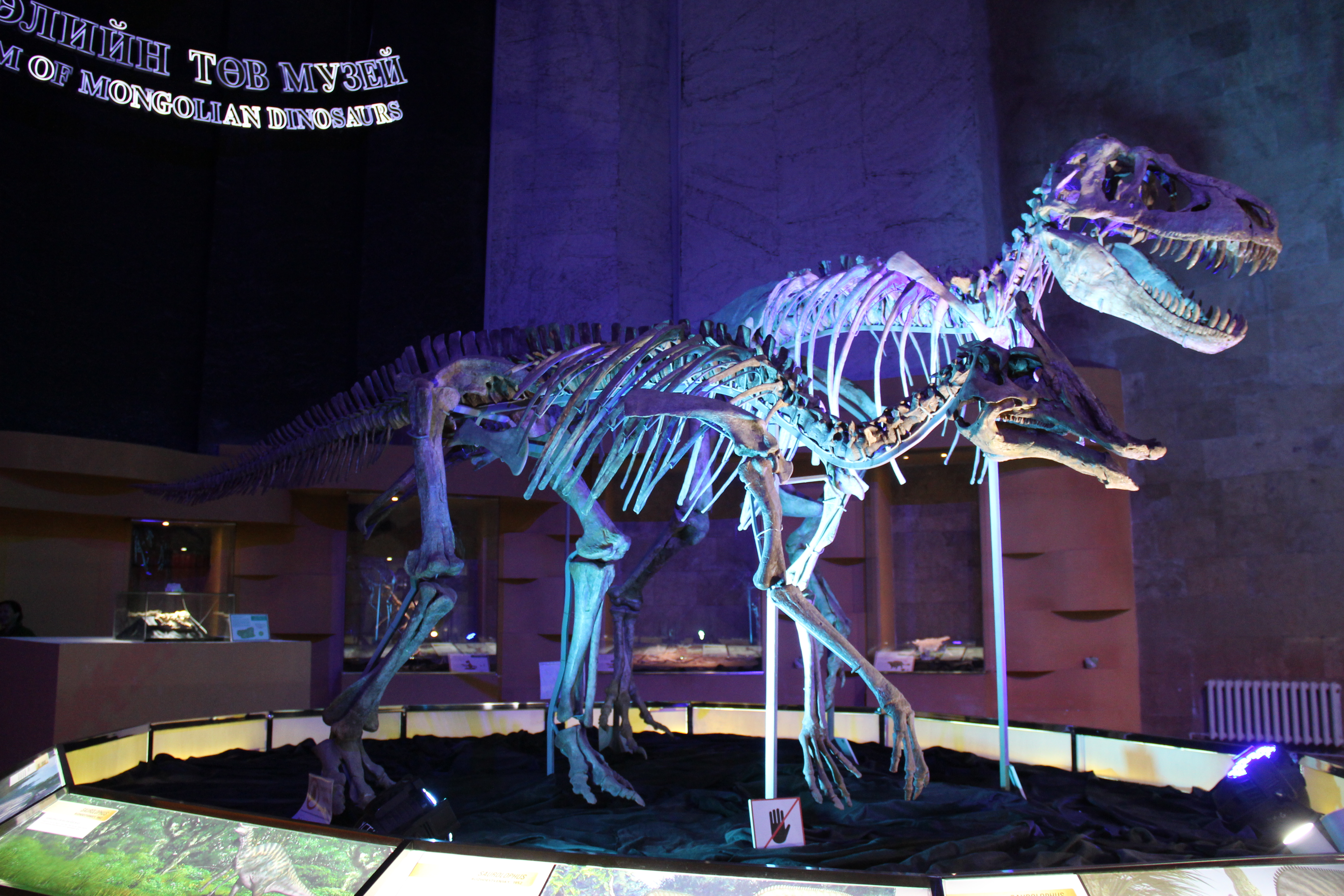
Tarbosaurus and Saurolophus skeletons that were smuggled to the US, and subsequently returned to Mongolia, at Central Museum of Mongolian Dinosaurs

Fossil trading is the practice of buying and selling fossils. It is illegal to buy and sell stolen fossils. Some scientifically important specimens are sold to collectors, rather than given to museums or institutes of study. Much focus has been put on the illegal fossil dealing in China, where many specimens have been stolen. The fossil trade of Morocco has also been the focus of international attention. The trade is lucrative, and many celebrities collect fossils.

The Society of Vertebrate Paleontology (SVP), an international association of professional and amateur vertebrate paleontologists, believes that scientifically important fossils—especially but not exclusively those found on public lands—should be held in perpetuity in the public trust, preferably in a museum or research institution, where they can benefit the scientific community as a whole as well as future generations. In the United States, Paleontological Resources Preservation Act. S. 546 and H. R. 2416 were introduced in the US Congress with SVP's full support.

Many commercial fossil collectors and dealers believe that such policies are a breach of their rights. The argument has also been put forth that there are too few professional paleontologists to collect and preserve fossils currently exposed to the elements, and that it is therefore essential that private citizens be allowed to collect them for the sake of their preservation. Eric Scott, the Curator of Paleontology for the San Bernardino County Museum, argues that private citizens and amateur (nonprofit) collectors can and do participate frequently in the permitted recovery and preservation of significant vertebrate fossils, and that the preservation of significant fossils does not require or mandate sale of those fossils.

According to the ethics by-law of SVP, "The barter, sale, or purchase of scientifically significant vertebrate fossils is not condoned, unless it brings them into or keeps them within a public trust."

Some fossil trade is not for collecting, but for the use of certain fossils in traditional medicine, mainly in East Asia but also in Europe and elsewhere.

== Societies and clubs ==
Many societies and clubs, namely Lapidary clubs, include fossil collectors. Many paleontological societies and fossil clubs also exist. There is some overlap between fossil collecting, mineral collecting, and amateur geology.

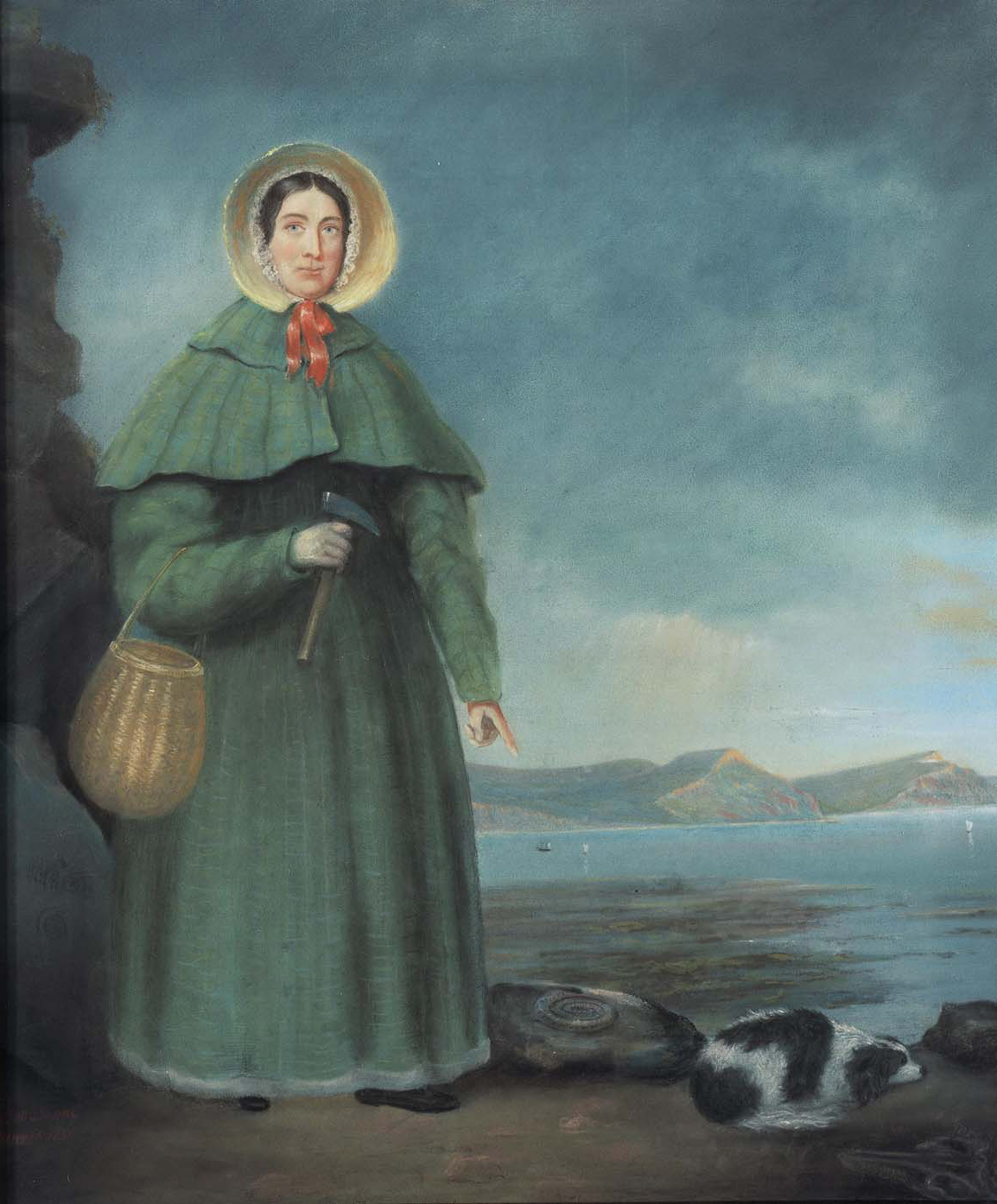
Mary Anning, a famous collector and seller of fossils

== Notable fossil collectors ==
- Mary Anning
- Robert Bakker
- Edward Drinker Cope
- Phil Currie
- Othniel Charles Marsh
- Paul Sereno
- Charles Hazelius Sternberg
- Peter Larson
- Stan Wood
- Fisk Holbrook Day
- Triebold Paleontology Incorporated

== See also ==
- Fossil park
- Lapidary club
- List of fossil sites
- Mineral collecting
- National Fossil Day
- Paleontologist
- Paleozoology
- Prehistoric life
