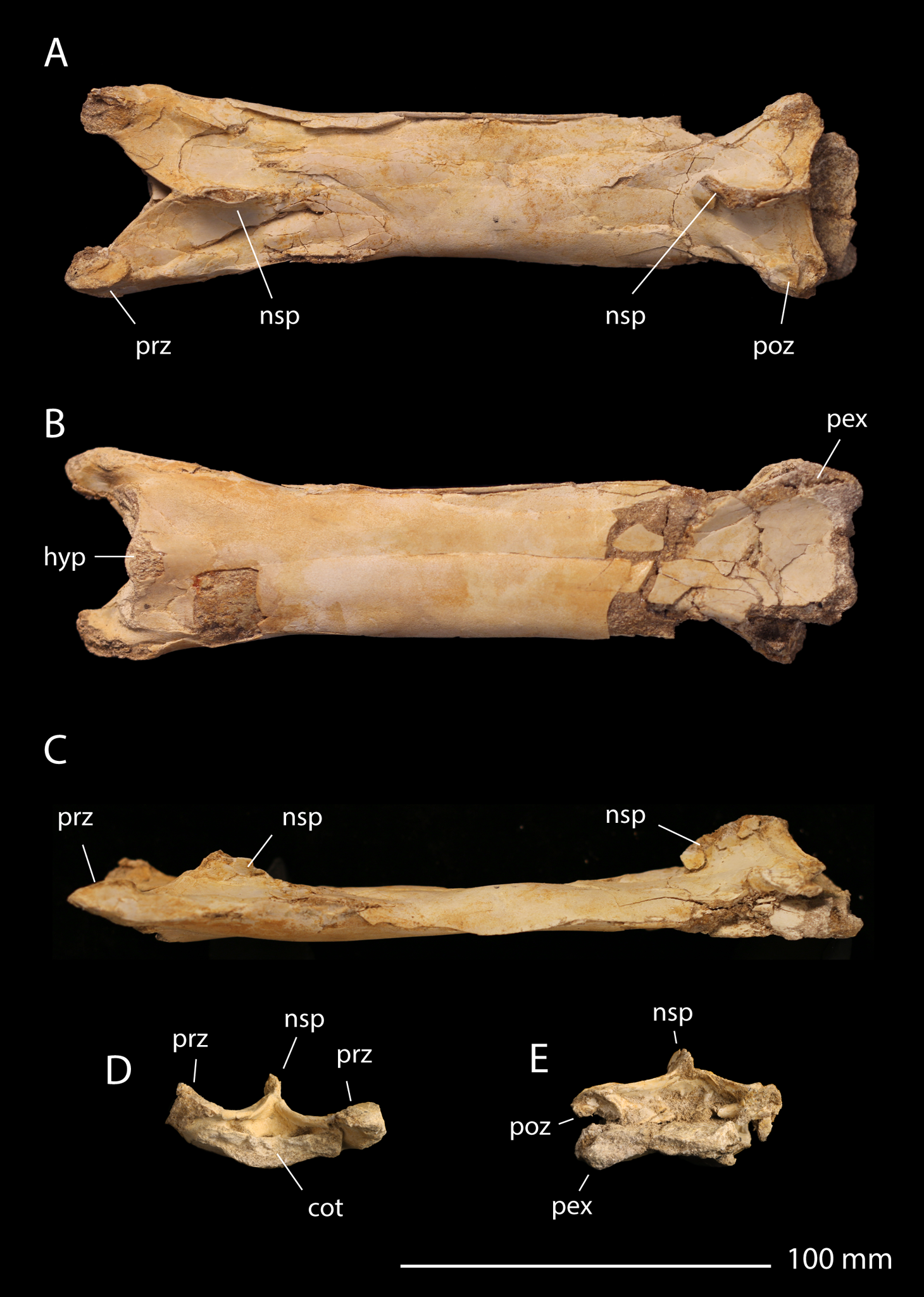
- Assigned C5 cervical (neck) vertebra in multiple views

Scientific classification
- Kingdom: Animalia
- Phylum: Chordata
- Class: Reptilia
- Order: †Pterosauria
- Suborder: †Pterodactyloidea
- Clade: †Azhdarchoidea
- Family: †Azhdarchidae
- Clade: †Phosphatodraconia
- Genus: †Phosphatodraco; Pereda-Suberbiola et al., 2003

Type species
- †Phosphatodraco mauritanicus Pereda-Suberbiola et al., 2003

= Phosphatodraco =

Phosphatodraco Temporal range: Late Cretaceous, 66 Ma

Genus of azhdarchid pterosaur from the Late Cretaceous

Phosphatodraco is a genus of azhdarchid pterosaur that lived during the Late Cretaceous of what is now Morocco. In 2000 a pterosaur specimen consisting of five cervical (neck) vertebrae was discovered in the Ouled Abdoun Phosphatic Basin. The specimen was made the holotype of the new genus and species Phosphatodraco mauritanicus in 2003; the genus name means "dragon from the phosphates", and the specific name refers to the region of Mauretania. Phosphatodraco was the first Late Cretaceous pterosaur known from North Africa, and the second pterosaur genus described from Morocco. It is one of the only known azhdarchids preserving a relatively complete neck, and was one of the last known pterosaurs. Additional cervical vertebrae have since been assigned to the genus, and it has been suggested that fossils of the pterosaur Tethydraco represent wing elements of Phosphatodraco.

Due to the fragmentary nature of the holotype cervical vertebrae, there has been controversy over their order. The describers considered them as cervicals (abbreviated as C) C5–C9 in the series, the first preserved vertebra (C5) being broken in two, but others consider them C3–C8, C3 and C4 being two different vertebrae. The interpretation followed has consequences for how Phosphatodraco is distinguished from other azhdarchids and how large it is thought to have been; the describers considered it to have had a wingspan of 5 m (16 ft); the alternate interpretation would lead to a 4 m (13 ft) wingspan. The complete neck may have been 865 mm (2 ft 10 in) long. Phosphatodraco is mainly distinguished by its C8 (or C7) vertebra being very elongated, 50% longer than the C5, and in having a prominent neural spine that is almost as tall as the centrum (the main part of the vertebra), truncated in a square shape at the top, and located far back. As an azhdarchid, it would have had a proportionally long neck, small body, and long limbs, compared to other pterosaurs.

The closest relatives of Phosphatodraco appear to have been Aralazhdarcho and Eurazhdarcho. Azhdarchids have historically been considered skim-feeders that caught prey from water in coastal settings, but it has since been suggested that the context in which their fossils are found and their morphology – such as their long, stiffened necks (informed by for example the neck of Phosphatodraco) – is more consistent with them having foraged terrestrially like storks or ground hornbills, but this is still debated. Although pterosaurs were thought to have declined in diversity towards the time of their extinction 66 million years ago, the diversity in taxa, including Phosphatodraco, in the Ouled Abdoun Basin, which dates to the late Maastrichtian, right before the Cretaceous-Paleogene extinction event, indicates their extinction happened abruptly.

== Discovery ==
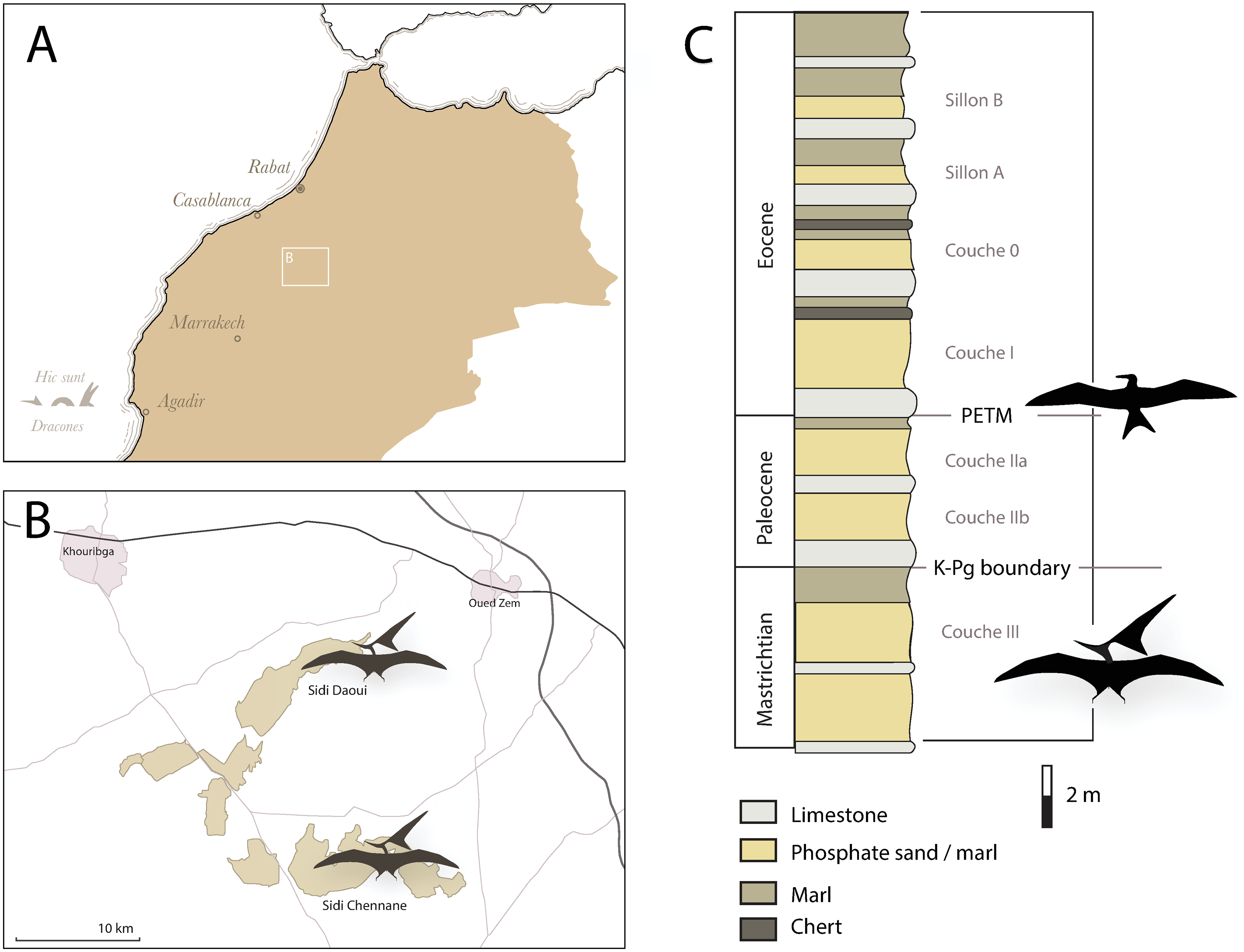
Location of phosphate mines in Morocco (A), the Sidi Daoui mine where Phosphatodraco was found (B), and stratigraphic location of the discovery site, "couche III" (C)

During the late 1990s, remains of pterosaurs began to be discovered in different fossil localities of Morocco, all dating to the Cretaceous period. In 2000 pterosaur fossils were found by the Office Chérifien des Phosphates (OCP, located in Casablanca) during paleontological field work in the eastern part of the Ouled Abdoun Phosphatic Basin near the city of Khouribga in central Morocco. They were collected from "site 1" in the Sidi Daoui mine in the northern part of Grand Daoui, an area in which phosphate is quarried. The fossils were found in the upper part of the stratigraphic unit which miners called "couche III". These excavations were part of a collaboration between the OCP, the Ministère de L'Energie et des Mines, Rabat, and the French Centre National de la Recherche Scientifique, which had taken place since 1997.

The pterosaur material, catalogued as specimen OCP DEK/GE 111, consists of five disarticulated but closely associated cervical (neck) vertebrae and an indeterminate bone, most likely belonging to a single individual. The vertebrae are crushed and damaged, and the surface of the bone is missing in some areas, with some infilling of phosphate sediments, and the fossils have therefore not been removed from the matrix. The block containing the bones is 98 cm (3 ft 3 in) long and 34 cm (1 ft 1 in) wide. During mechanical preparation of the specimen fossil remains of other animals were also found in association, including of several types of fish and mosasaurs.

The specimen was made the holotype of the new genus and species Phosphatodraco mauritanicus by paleontologist Xabier Pereda-Suberbiola and colleagues in 2003. The genus name derives from the words phosphate and the Latin draco, meaning "dragon from the phosphates", and the specific name refers to the region of Mauretania where the fossils were found. The describers gave the etymology of Mauretania as Latin for North Africa; other sources specify it as an area stretching from Algeria to Morocco. Phosphatodraco was the first Late Cretaceous pterosaur known from North Africa (and thus the first known member of the family Azhdarchidae of this age from the region), and only the second pterosaur genus described from Morocco (the first being Siroccopteryx). At the time it was described, it was one of the only known azhdarchids preserving a relatively complete neck (the others being Zhejiangopterus and Quetzalcoatlus), and was one of the last known pterosaurs. Complete neck vertebral series are rare for azhdarchids, but such vertebrae are some of the most commonly found and best known remains of the group.

In 2018 paleontologist Nicholas R. Longrich and colleagues reported pterosaur fossils collected from "couche III" in cooperation with the Moroccan fossil industry the previous three years; until that point, only the single specimen of Phosphatodraco was known from the assemblage. At the time, the collection was the largest and most diverse collection of pterosaurs from the Maastrichtian age of the Late Cretaceous, and included two cervical vertebrae they assigned to Phosphatodraco, based on similarity with the holotype in size and proportions. One of the vertebrae, specimen FSAC-OB 12, was identified as a C5 (though stated in the description to be similar to C6 of the holotype); the other, FSAC-OB 13, was identified only as a cervical vertebra. The cervical ribs (ribs of the neck vertebrae) of FSAC-OB 12 do not appear to have yet fused to the centrum (the main part of the vertebra), so the animal may not have been completely mature. These specimens are housed at Faculté des Sciences Aïn Chock in Casablanca.

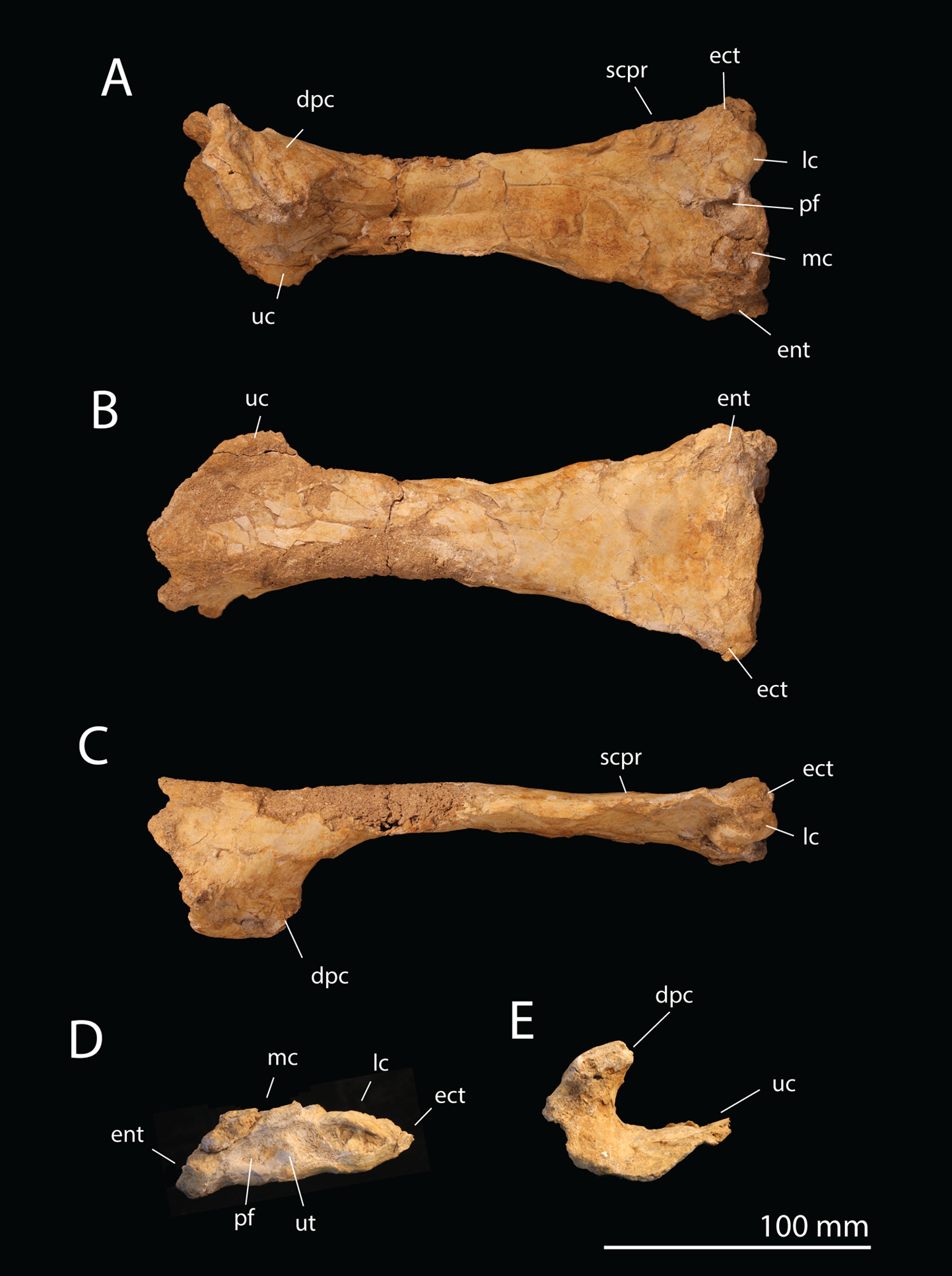
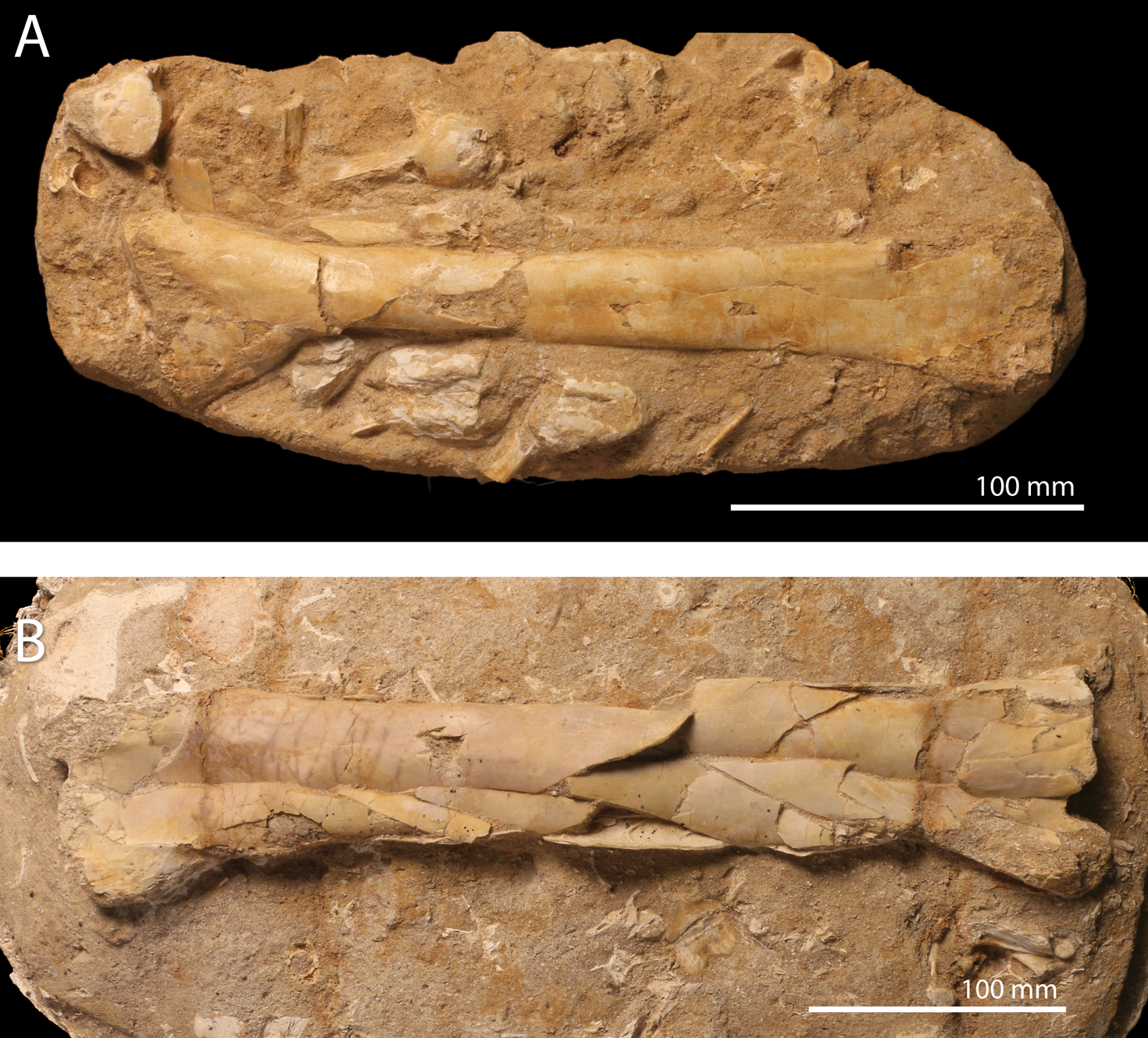
Humerus (left) and ulnae (right) of Tethydraco, which have been suggested to belong to Phosphatodraco

In 2020 paleontologists Claudio Labita and David M. Martill described an articulated (where the bones are connected as in life) pterosaur wing from "couche III" (specimen FSAC CP 251, bought from fossil dealers), which they assigned to Tethydraco, a genus also described by Longrich and colleagues in 2018 based on a humerus (upper arm bone). Tethydraco was originally considered a pteranodontid, but Labita and Martill concluded it was an azhdarchid, and that it possibly represented the wing elements of Phosphatodraco. They noted that more associated and articulated pterosaur fossils were being collected from these deposits due to improving methods used by fossil diggers, and that azhdarchid fossils were becoming abundant. They also cautioned that the provenance of some of the Moroccan fossils was difficult to establish, due to the commercial nature of their collection. In 2022 paleontologist Alexandra E. Fernandes and colleagues noted similarities between the humerus of Epapatelo and Tethydraco, and recovered Tethydraco as a pteranodontian. In 2023 paleontologists Adele Pentland and Stephen Poropat noted that while the hatchet-shaped deltopectoral crest of FSAC CP 251 is consistent with Azhdarchidae, it differs from the shape of the Tethydraco holotype.

=== Interpretations of cervical (neck) vertebra order ===
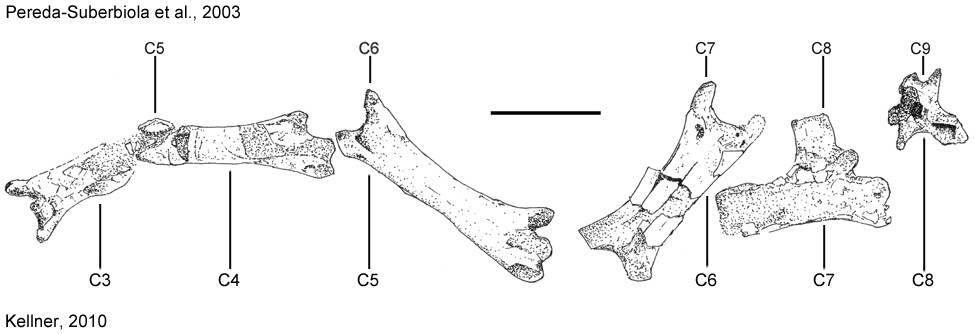
Illustration of the holotype cervical vertebra series as preserved, with interpretation of its order by Pereda-Suberbiola and colleagues, 2003 (above, C5–C9), and Kellner, 2010 (below, C3–C8)

Pereda-Suberbiola and colleagues originally interpreted the five preserved cervical vertebrae of Phosphatodraco as cervicals C5–C9. The frontmost preserved vertebra they interpreted as C5 consisted of two fragments; they found it unlikely that these belonged to two different vertebrae, since they lay in continuity with no sediment in between, and overlapped each other in some areas. They considered the sideways expansion at the front of this vertebra to be due to crushing, and pointed out that such preservation where fragile, yet well-preserved bones are associated with damaged material of the same individual is known from other vertebrate fossils in the same level. They identified the frontmost vertebra as a C5 because this is usually the longest cervical vertebra in pterosaurs, their length decreasing hindward.

In 2007 paleontologist Alexander W. A. Kellner and colleagues noted that Phosphatodraco was one of the most interesting azhdarchids found in Africa, but used cautious language about the original interpretation of the vertebrae. Kellner suggested in 2010 that interpretation of the holotype specimen had been affected by taphonomy (changes during decay and fossilisation); he instead proposed that the element originally described as a fifth cervical vertebra was actually the third and fourth vertebrae which had been compressed together, giving the impression that they were a single vertebra broken in the middle. This would shift the order of the vertebrae to C3–C8, and though this did not change the validity of the taxon (its distinctness being based on its stratigraphy, geography, and morphology), Kellner noted that the diagnosis (the suite of features that distinguish a taxon) and size estimate had to be reevaluated. The frontmost cervical vertebrae which are missing from Phosphatodraco in either scheme are the atlas (C1, which connects with the back of the skull) and the axis (C2).

Subsequent articles from 2011 and 2015 with Kellner among the co-authorship have concurred with Kellner's interpretation. Paleontologist Alexander Averianov disagreed with Kellner's reinterpretation of the cervical vertebrae in 2014, and considered the original description accurate. A 2015 article by paleontologist Mátyás Vremir and colleagues called the issue "controversial" and considered the specimen too crushed for proper comparison, and Martill and Markus Moser concurred with this in 2018. Paleontologists Darren Naish and Mark P. Witton (the co-authors of Vremir's article) followed Kellner's interpretation in 2017. Paleontologist Rubi V. Pêgas and colleagues also followed Kellner's order in 2021. Though the palaeontologist Alexandru A. Solomon and colleagues noted the suggested change in interpretation of the holotype order in 2019, they stated that even if the reinterpretation was correct, the specimen was too damaged for comparison with the single known cervical vertebra of their new genus Albadraco.

== Description ==
Estimated size (upper middle in turquoise) compared to contemporary pterosaurs, birds, and a human

In their 2003 description, Pereda-Suberbiola and colleagues estimated Phosphatodraco to have had a wingspan close to 5 m (16 ft), based on comparison with other azhdarchids with preserved cervical vertebrae, and referred to it as a "large azhdarchid pterosaur". This is larger than azhdarchids such as Zhejiangopterus and Montanazhdarcho, and comparable to the smaller species of Quetzalcoatlus, Q. lawsoni; the larger Q. northropi is thought to have reached 10 to 11 metres (33 to 36 ft), thereby being the largest known flying animal. Witton grouped Phosphatodraco with "midsized" azhdarchids based on this size estimate in 2013. In 2010 Kellner suggested this size estimate too large, based on his reinterpretation of the neck vertebra order. Naish and Witton, who followed Kellner's interpretation, listed a neck-length of 865 mm (2 ft 10 in) for Phosphatodraco in 2017, and a wingspan of 4 m (13 ft).

There were two main types of azhdarchid skulls; very long, low skulls that were up to ten times longer than wide, and some that were much shorter than that, closer to those of other pterosaurs. Some had crests and some did not. Azhdarchids had necks that were proportionally longer than those of other pterosaurs, and their vertebral column and much of the rest of the skeleton was pneumatized (filled with air-sacs that lightened it). The body skeleton of azhdarchids was small but robust, and their upper arm bones were solidly built. Their wing-metacarpals (the hand bones that connect with the fingers) were relatively the largest among pterosaurs, and the longest bones in the wings; their wing-fingers (which supported the wing-membranes) were relatively short. The pelvises were relatively robust, and the hindlimbs long. Combined, the long-wing metacarpals and legs made azhdarchids relatively taller when standing than other pterosaurs, though their feet were narrow and short. As known from other pterosaurs, Phosphatodraco would have been covered with hair-like pycnofibers in life.

=== Cervical vertebrae ===
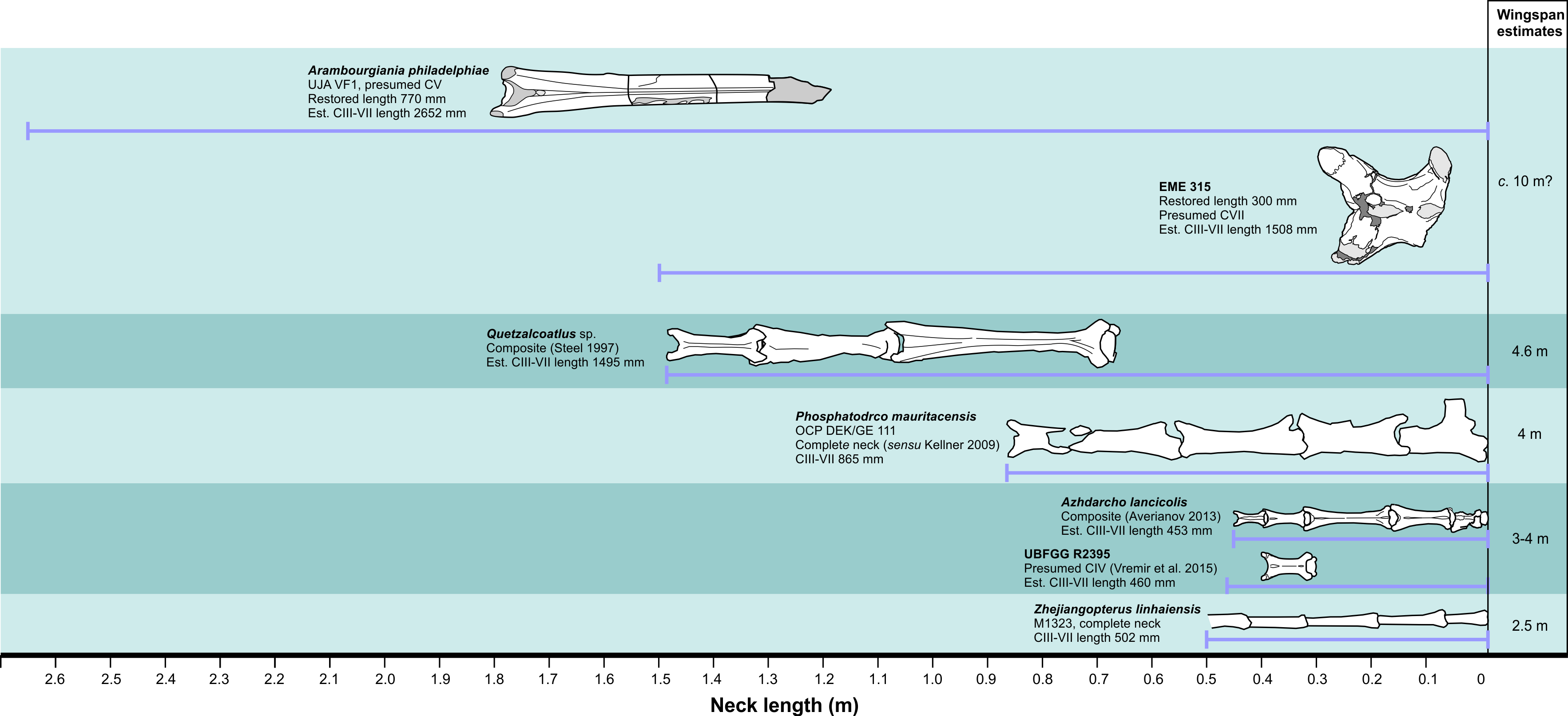
Azhdarchid neck-lengths compared to their estimated wingspans. Phosphatodraco is fourth from the top, following Kellner's interpretation. (The last preserved vertebra is not shown.)

The suite of features that distinguish a taxon from other related taxa is called a diagnosis, and in the case of Phosphatodraco, these features are all found in the cervical vertebrae. Since Pereda-Suberbiola and colleagues considered the preserved vertebrae to be C5–C9 of the series in their description, that is the diagnosis and description followed here. Note that if Kellner's suggestion that the series actually represents vertebrae C3–C8 is correct, the diagnostic features listed by Pereda-Suberbiola and colleagues may possibly be inaccurate, and the following description would refer to different vertebrae in the series. Pereda-Suberbiola and colleagues found Phosphatodraco to differ from other azhdarchids in that the hindmost vertebra, C8 in their order, is very elongated, 50% longer than C5, and has a prominent neural spine (the spine that projects upwards from the vertebra) that is almost as tall as the centrum, truncated in a square shape at the top, and located far back. Phosphatodraco is also distinct in that the ratio between the maximum length of the vertebrae and the front width between prezygapophyses (processes at the sides of the centrum which connected with the postzygapophyses of the previous vertebrae) of the middle cervical vertebrae is about 4.3 in C5 and 4.1 in C6.

The five preserved cervical vertebrae have hollow centra and their cortical bone (the outer, thick layer) is about 1 mm (0.039 in) thick. The vertebrae vary in length, the longest being the frontmost of those preserved, a C5 broken in two according to Pereda-Suberbiola and colleagues (C3–C4 according to Kellner), which they estimated to have been about 300 mm (0.98 ft) long when complete. The first of these fragments is 110 mm (4.3 in), the second is about 190 mm (7.5 in). When viewed from the side, the hind end of this vertebra shows a developed left postzygapophysis, and the convex articular condyle (the condyle that connected with the following vertebra) and left postexapophysial process (which connected with the preexapophys at the front of the preceding vertebra) is in front of it, all lying in the same plane due to crushing.

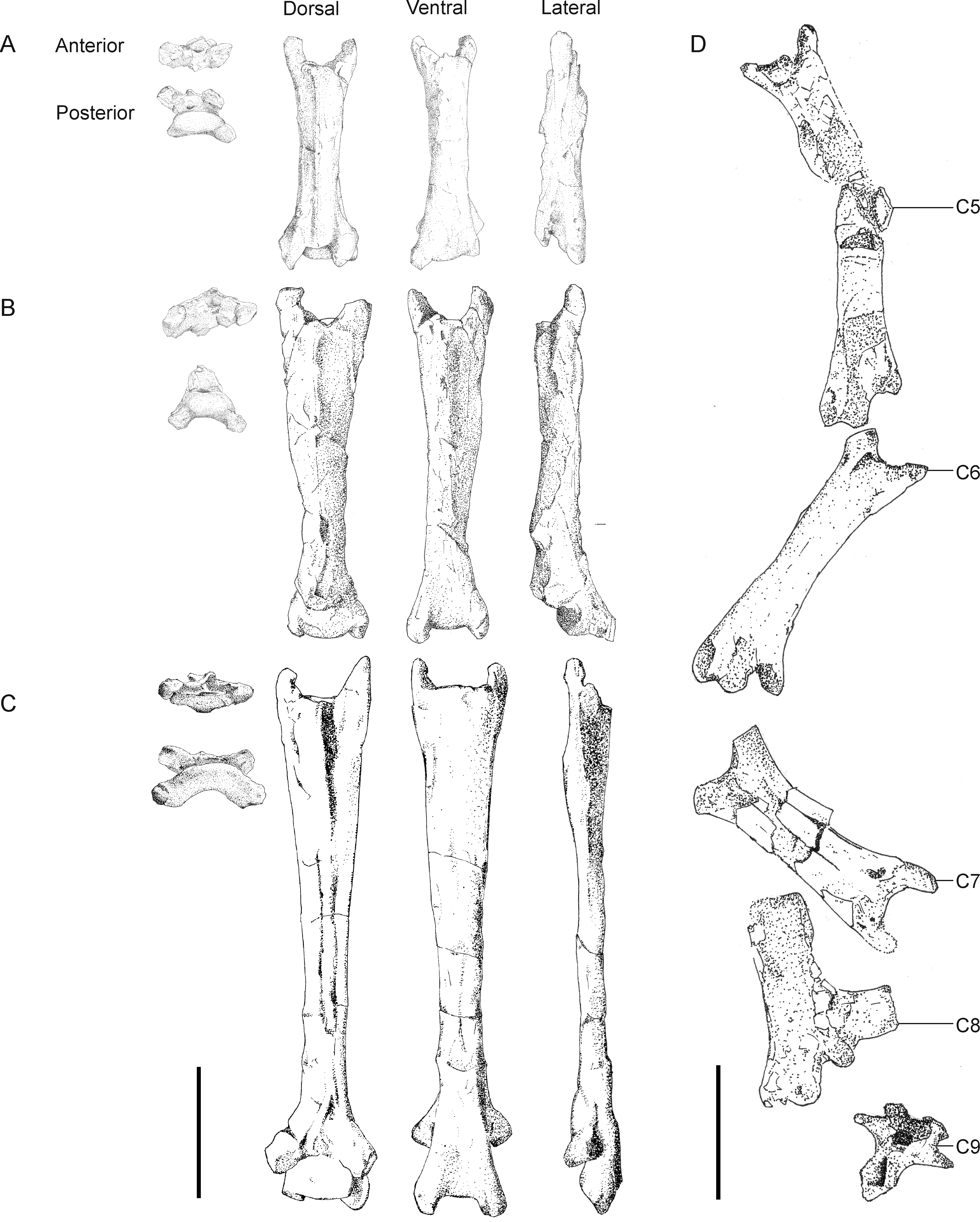
C3–C5 vertebrae of Quetzalcoatlus (A–C) compared with those of Phosphatodraco (D)

The C6 (Kellner's C5) is the best-preserved of the vertebrae, and is shorter than the preceding C5, about 225 mm (8.9 in) long. It is distorted so that the front part is visible in lower side view, and the hind part is visible in left side view. Its centrum is procoelous (concave at the front surface), its prezygapophyses are horn-like, and nearly concave and parallel when seen from below. The right prezygapophys has a small tubercle (a rounded projection) at the midline, and there is no indication of additional processes at the front end of the vertebra or pneumatic foramina (holes) on the side surface of the centrum. The front cotyle (the concave front end of the centrum) is distorted, but it appears to be twice as wide as high, ovoid (or egg-shaped), and with a slightly concave upper margin. The lower margin has a prominent hypapophysis (a downwards projection), and this keel's height diminishes towards the centrum's mid-length. There is a longitudinal oval sulcus (a groove) on the right side of the lower surface, near the base of the prezygapophysis. The lower surface of the centrum is nearly flat, and the postexapophys is well-developed at the lower side of the condyle, like in the preceding vertebrae.

The following C7 vertebra (Kellner's C6) is visible in bottom view, is missing the hind part, the preserved part being 190 mm (7.5 in) long, and the complete length perhaps being the same or shorter as the preceding C6. Its prezygapophyses are similar to those of the preceding vertebra, and the cotyle is oval and compressed from top to bottom. There is a sulcus below the left prezygapophys, apparently without a ridge extending hindward. The centrum bulges slightly hindward, becoming narrower at its mid-length. The postzygapophyses are well-developed, and diverge widely from the longitudinal midline of the centrum. A small protuberance between the postzygapophyses perhaps indicates where the upper margin of the neural canal (through which the spinal cord passed) was located, though its features cannot be accurately determined.

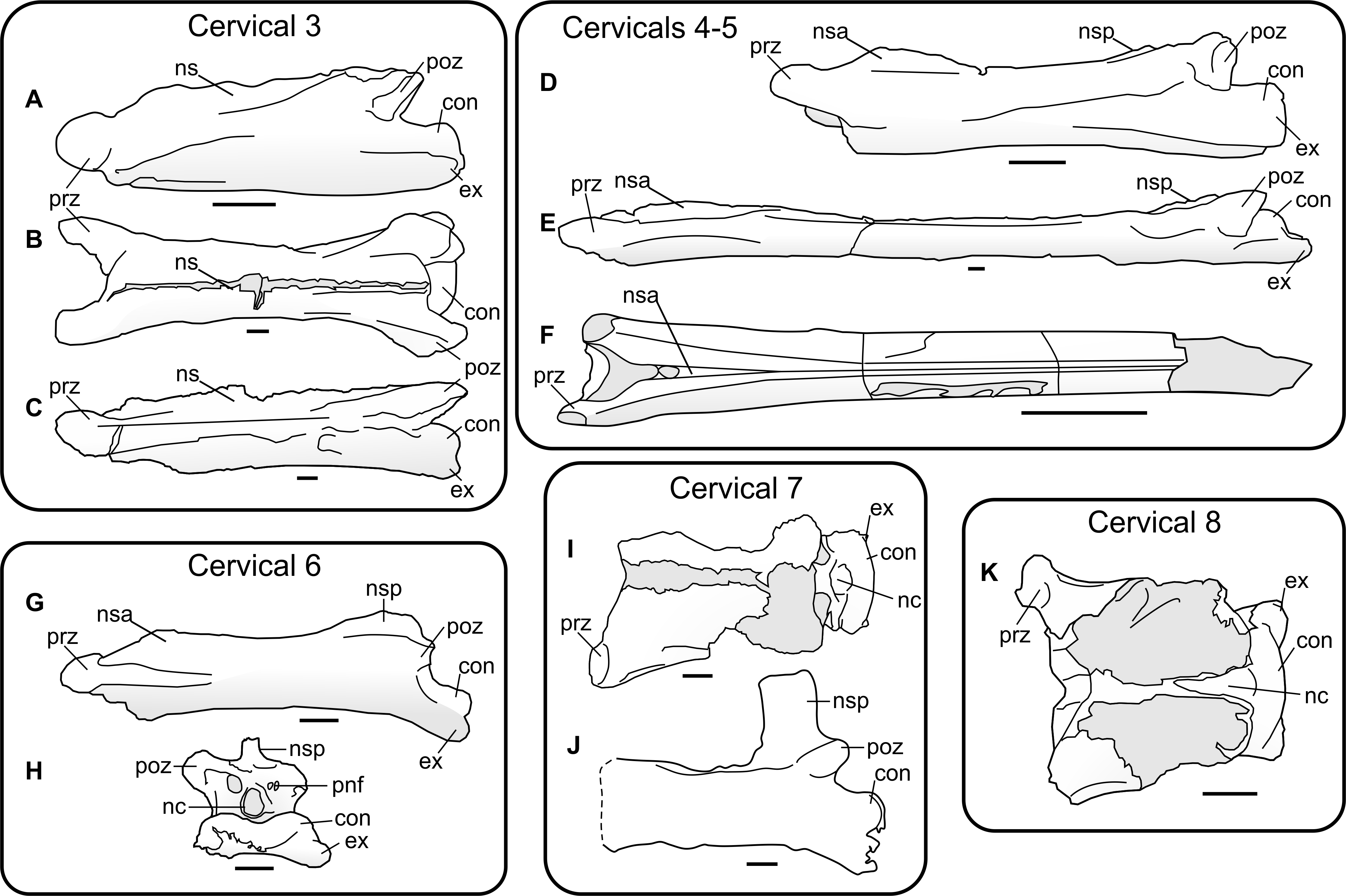
Characteristics of azhdarchid cervical vertebrae; J is the C7 of Phosphatodraco following Kellner's order. (It is C8 in Pereda-Suberbiola and colleagues' order.)

The next to last vertebra is C8 (Kellner's C7) which is visible in side view, and despite missing some of the front, the centrum is very elongated, measuring 150 mm (5.9 in). The most notable feature of this vertebra is its tall neural spine, which is placed at its hindmost part. The neural spine is 40 mm (1.6 in) high measured from the upper surface of the postzygapophys to the top, almost the same height as the centrum, which is 45 mm (1.8 in). The front and hind margins of the neural spine are vertically parallel to each other, and its top is truncated in a square shape, and perpendicular to the side edges. The left postzygapophys is located at the base of the hind end of the neural arch (which forms the arch of bone through which the spinal cord passed). It is similar to the same vertebra of Quetzalcoatlus in that the neural spine is square on top, but differs in being placed so far back. The left postexaphophyseal process is well-developed at the back and below, but does not extend past the condyle as it does in the preceding vertebrae.

The last vertebra is the C9 according to Pereda-Suberbiola and colleagues (Kellner's C8,) which is visible in hind view, and its preserved part is 75 mm (3.0 in) high. Its neural arch has a large neural spine and well-developed transverse processes (which projected from the sides of the centrum and acted as attachment points for muscles and ligaments). The neural spine terminates in a blunt process above, and the hind side of the neural spine has an oval depression, which has thick vertical edges at its sides. The transverse processes are long and slender, and project to the sides and slightly downwards. The neural canal is small and nearly circular, is about 22 mm (0.87 in) in diameter, and there are no pneumatic foramina near it. Its condyle is broad, around five times wider than high, and is crescent-shaped in cross-section. The left postexapophysis is placed at the side of the condyle and almost vertical. Though none of the vertebrae preserve cervical ribs, the development of the transverse processes of the last vertebra indicates that it probably had ribs. The indeterminate bone fragment associated with the two last vertebrae has a similar texture to them, is flat and crescent-shaped, and is about 9 mm (0.35 in) wide and 44 mm (1.7 in) long.

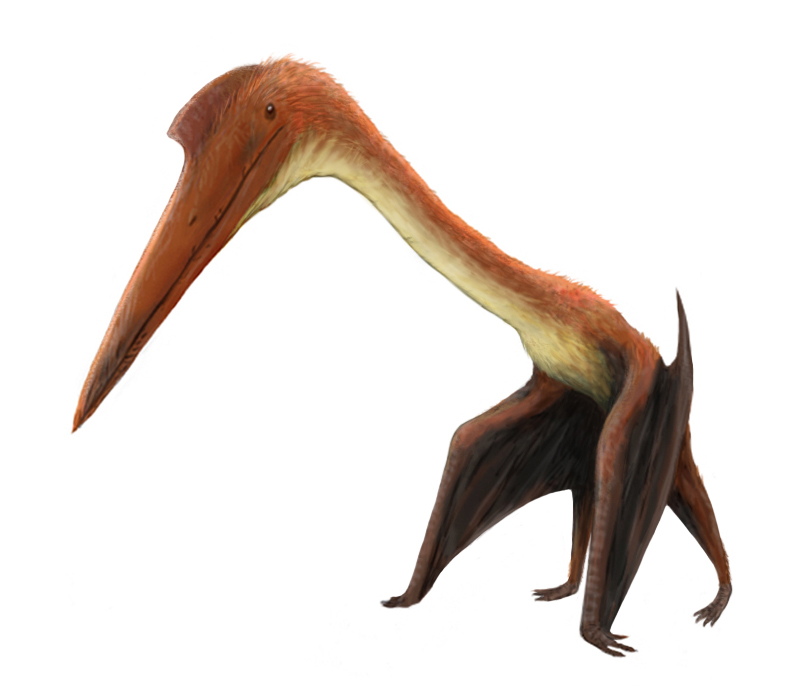
Life restoration showing Phosphatodraco in terrestrial pose

Pereda-Suberbiola and colleagues found that the frontmost preserved cervical vertebrae of Phosphatodraco (their C5–C7) were similar in form to those of the mid-series cervical vertebrae of other long-necked pterodactyloid pterosaurs (the group consisting of short-tailed pterosaurs). The last hindmost preserved vertebrae (their C8–C9) have some features in common with the rest of the vertebrae, including broad, ovoid cotyles and condyles, as well as postexapophyses, but they differ in their neural canal being demarcated from the centrum and in having a prominent neural spine. Pereda-Suberbiola and colleagues suggested the C8–C9 could be cervicalized dorsal vertebrae, back vertebrae which have been incorporated into the neck. The total number of cervical vertebrae in pterosaurs varies between seven and nine, and the first dorsal vertebra is considered to be the first one that connects with the sternum (breast bone). Early pterosaurs like Rhamphorhynchus had eight cervical vertebrae with cervical ribs on at least C3–C8; later pterodactyloids had seven vertebrae and no ribs. In later pterdactyloid groups, nine cervical vertebrae are present, two of them being cervicalized dorsals, and adults have a notarium (a structure consisting of fused vertebrae in the shoulder region, also seen in birds).

== Classification ==
In their 2003 description Pereda-Suberbiola and colleagues considered Phosphatodraco a member of Azhdarchidae based on features such as its mid-series cervical vertebrae being elongated, with low vestigial (almost evolutionarily lost) or absent neural spines, the presence of prezygapophyseal tubercles, a pair of lower sulci near the prezygapophyses, and the lack of oval pneumatic foramina on the lower surfaces of the centra. These features are especially similar to those of Quetzalcoatlus and Azhdarcho. Other features distinguishing the group could not be identified in Phosphatodraco due to the preservation of its fossils.

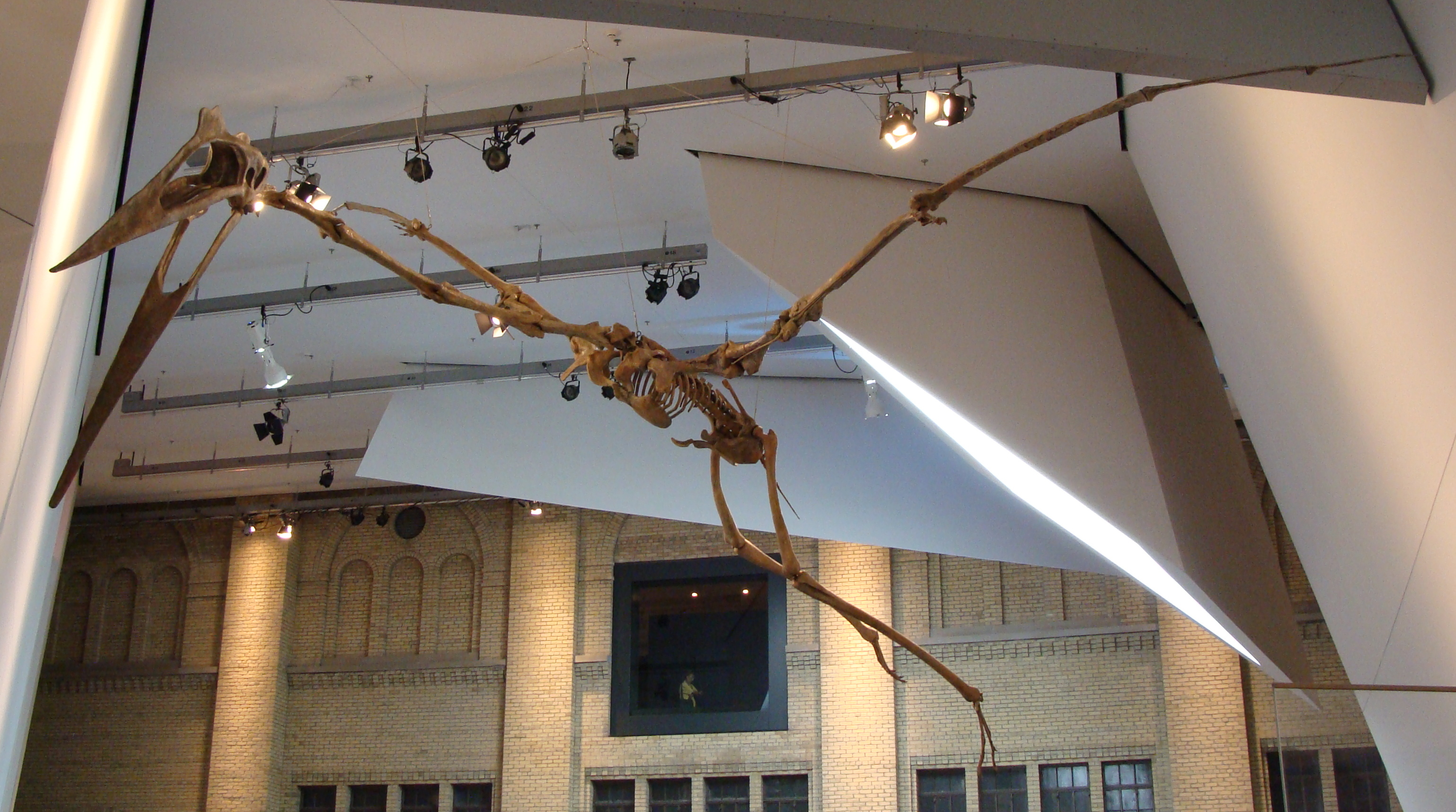
Reconstructed skeleton of the related Quetzalcoatlus in a flying pose

Longrich and colleagues performed a phylogenetic analysis in 2018 that included Moroccan pterosaurs. They found Phosphatodraco to be an azhdarchid and the sister taxon of Aralazhdarcho from Kazakhstan. A 2021 analysis by Pêgas and colleagues also found these two genera to be sister taxa, joined in a clade by Eurazhdarcho from Romania. This clade was supported by one clear synapomorphy (a distinct, ancestrally shared feature), that the side margin of the mid-cervical vertebrae is straight when viewed from above and below, with almost parallel sides. These researchers noted that previous studies had defined Azhdarchidae as a node-based clade with Azhdarcho and Quetzalcoatlus as internal specifiers, but cautioned that in their new phylogeny, Phosphatodraco, Zhejiangopterus, and Eurazhdarcho would fall outside the group. They found this undesirable, as those genera had otherwise consistently been considered azhdarchids, and that for stability's sake, Phosphatodraco should be added as a third internal specifier for the group, since this would result in all these taxa being included.

In 2021 American paleontologist Brian Andres also found Phosphatodraco and Aralazhdarcho to be sister taxa, supported by the reduction of pneumatic foramina on the side of the neural canal. This clade was recovered as part of the azhdarchid subclade Quetzalcoatlinae. The first cladogram below shows the placement of Phosphatodraco within Azhdarchidae according to the phylogenetic analysis by Andres in 2021. In a 2022 phylogenetic analysis by Argentinian paleontologist Leonardo Ortiz David and colleagues, Phosphatodraco and Aralazhdarcho were again recovered as sister taxa, corroborating their close relationship that is based on similar features. However, unlike Andres in 2021, Ortiz David and colleagues found both pterosaurs outside Quetzalcoatlinae, in a more basal (primitive) position within Azhdarchidae, forming a clade with Eurazhdarcho. Their study follows the arrangement proposed by Pêgas and colleagues in their 2021 analysis. The second cladogram below shows the results of their phylogenetc analysis.

Topology 1: Andres (2021).

- Azhdarchidae
  - Azhdarchinae
    - Azhdarcho lancicollis
    - - Albadraco tharmisensis
      - - Aerotitan sudamericanus
        - Mistralazhdarcho maggii
  - Quetzalcoatlinae
    - - Aralazhdarcho bostobensis
      - Phosphatodraco mauritanicus
    - - Eurazhdarcho langendorfensis
      - - Zhejiangopterus linhaiensis
        - - Wellnhopterus brevirostris
          - Cryodrakon boreas
          - - Hatzegopteryx thambema
            - - Arambourgiania philadelphiae
              - - Quetzalcoatlus lawsoni
                - Quetzalcoatlus northropi

Topology 2: Ortiz David and colleagues (2022).

- Azhdarchidae
  - - Eurazhdarcho langendorfensis
    - - Phosphatodraco mauritanicus
      - Aralazhdarcho bostobensis
  - - Zhejiangopterus linhaiensis
    - - Azhdarcho lancicollis
      - Quetzalcoatlinae
        - - - Arambourgiania philadelphiae
            - - Aerotitan sudamericanus
              - Mistralazhdarcho maggii
          - - - Hatzegopteryx thambema
              - Albadraco tharmisensis
        - - Cryodrakon boreas
          - - Thanatosdrakon amaru
            - - Quetzalcoatlus lawsoni
              - - aff. Quetzalcoatlus (FSAC-OB 14)
                - Quetzalcoatlus northropi

In 2025, Pêgas and colleagues named the new clade Phosphatodraconia, containing Phosphatodraco, Aralazhdarcho, Eurazhdarcho, and Wellnhopterus, based on cervical vertebra features. The American paleontologists Henry N. Thomas and Skye N. McDavid recognized Phosphatodraconia the same year, and noted that members of some azhdarchid groups, including phosphatodraconians, are found on both sides of oceans, suggesting that transoceanic dispersal could have been frequent among them.

== Paleobiology ==
=== Feeding and ecological niche ===
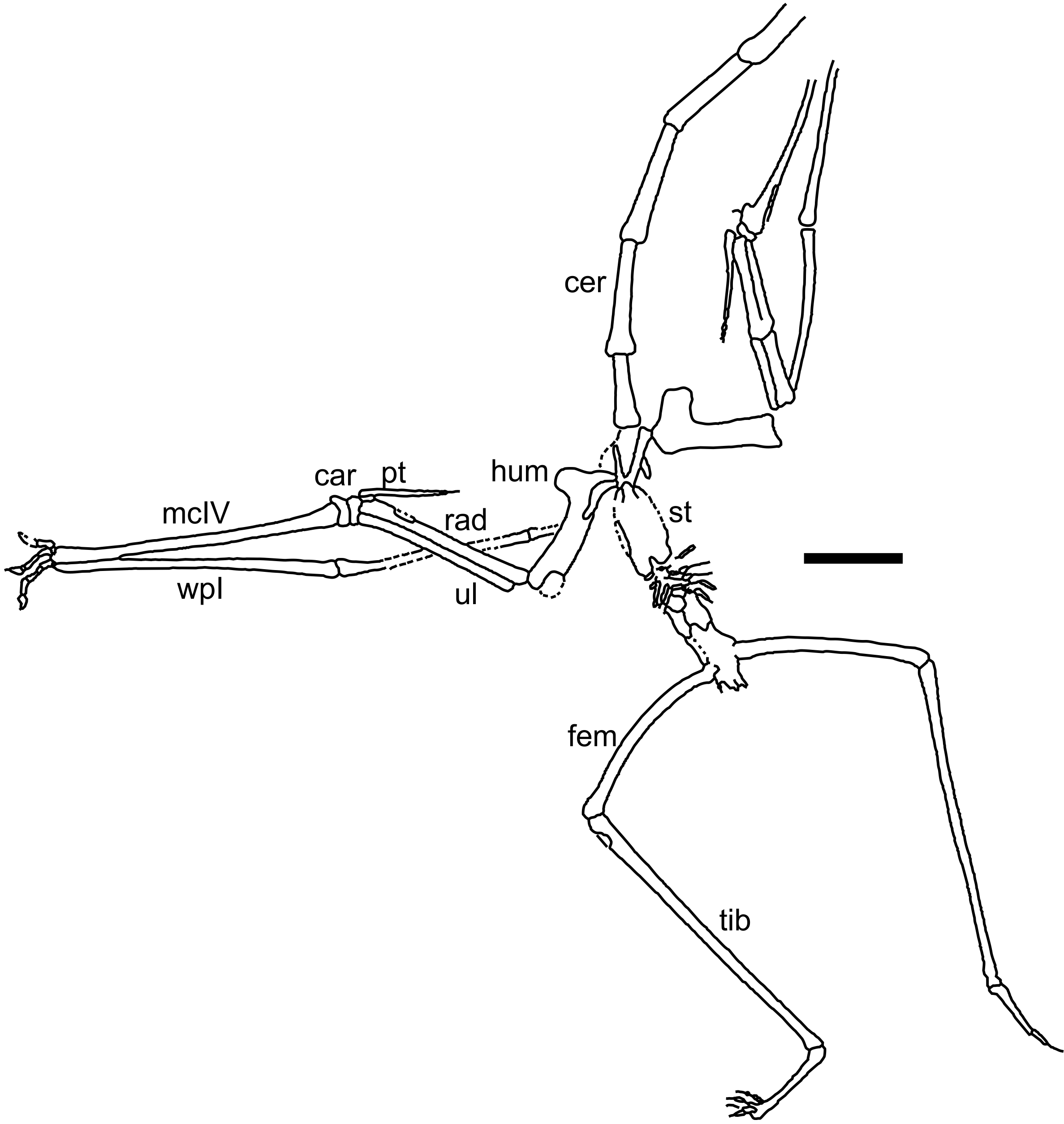
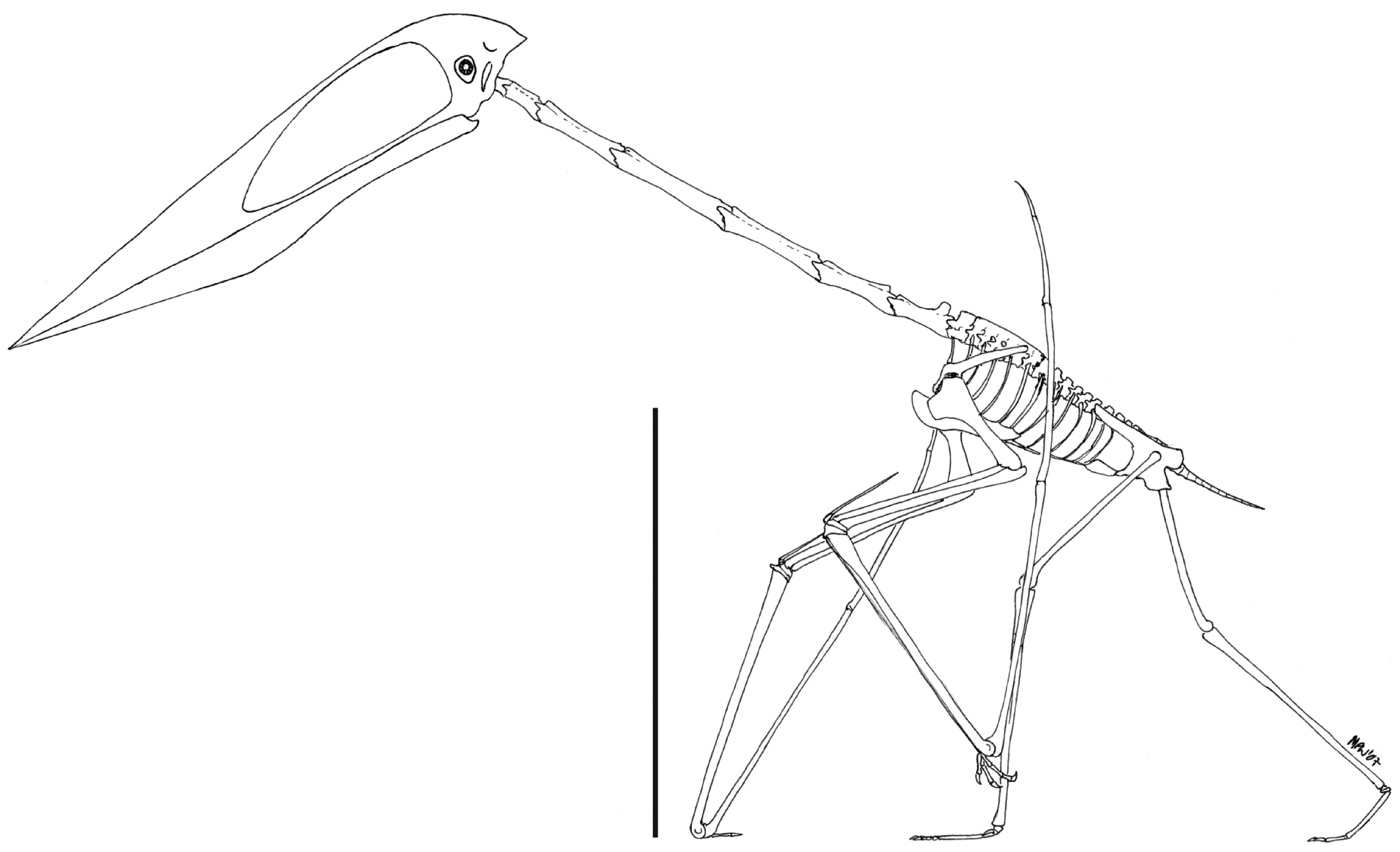
Skeletal diagrams showing Zhejiangopterus (left, as preserved without skull, right, as reconstructed), one of the two other azhdarchids known preserved with a relatively complete neck. The other is Quetzalcoatlus.

In 2008 Witton and Naish pointed out that although azhdarchids have historically been considered to have been scavengers, probers of sediment, swimmers, waders, aerial predators, or stork-like generalists, most researchers until that point had considered them to have been skim-feeders living in coastal settings, which fed by trawling their lower jaws through water while flying and catching prey from the surface (like skimmers and some terns). In general, pterosaurs have historically been considered marine piscivores (fish-eaters), and despite their unusual anatomy, azhdarchids have been assumed to have occupied the same ecological niche. Witton and Naish noted that evidence for this mode of feeding lacked support from azhdarchid anatomy and functional morphology; they lacked cranial features such as sideways compressed lower jaws and the shock-absorbing adaptations required, and their jaws instead appear to have been almost triangular in cross-section, unlike those of skim-feeders and probers.

Witton and Naish instead stated that azhdarchids probably inhabited inland environments, based on the taphonomic contexts their fossils have been found in (more than half the fossils surveyed were from for example fluvial or alluvial deposits, and most of the marine occurrences also had fossils of terrestrial lifeforms), and their morphology made them ill-suited for lifestyles other than wading and foraging terrestrially, though their feet were relatively small, slender, and had pads, not suited for wading either. These researchers instead argued that azhdarchids were similar to storks or ground hornbills, generalists they termed "terrestrial stalkers" that foraged in different kinds of environments for small animals and carrion, supported by their apparent proficiency on the ground and relatively inflexible necks, for example the well-preserved neck of Phosphatodraco providing information about their morphology. Witton and Naish suggested that their more generalist lifestyle could explain the group's resilience compared to other pterosaur lineages, which were not thought to have survived until the late Maastrichtian like the azhdarchids did (pterosaurs went extinct along with the non-bird dinosaurs during the Cretaceous-Paleogene extinction event 66 million years ago).

Witton elaborated in a 2013 book that the proportions of azhdarchids would have been consistent with them striding through vegetated areas with their long limbs, and their downturned skull and jaws reaching the ground. Their long, stiffened necks would be an advantage as it would help lowering and raising the head and give it a vantage point when searching for prey, and enable them to grab small animals and fruit. In their 2021 study that reinterpreted Tethydraco as an azhdarchid, and possibly the same as Phosphatodraco, Labita and Martill noted that azhdarchids might have been less terrestrial than suggested by Witton and Naish, since the Moroccan fossils were from marine strata, as was Arambourgiania from the phosphates of Jordan. They noted that no azhdarchids had been found in truly terrestrial strata, and proposed they could instead have been associated with aquatic environments, such as rivers, lakes, marine and off-shore settings.

Pterosaurs are generally thought to have gone gradually extinct by decreasing in diversity towards the end of the Cretaceous, but Longrich and colleagues suggested this impression could be a result of the poor fossil records for pterosaurs (the Signor-Lipps Effect). Since they found multiple lineages (Pteranodontidae, Nyctosauridae, and Azhdarchidae, the latter including Phosphatodraco and others) to have co-existed during the late Maastrichtian of Morocco, this is the most diverse pterosaur assemblage known from the Late Cretaceous. Pterosaurs during this time thereby had increased niche-partitioning compared to earlier faunas from the Santonian and Campanian ages, and they were able to outcompete birds in large size based niches, and birds therefore remained small, not exceeding 2 m (6.6 ft) wingspans during the Late Cretaceous (most pterosaurs during this time had larger wingspans, and thereby avoided the small-size niche). To these researchers, this indicated that the extinction of pterosaurs was abrupt instead of gradual, caused by the catastrophic Chicxulub impact. Their extinction freed up more niches that were then filled by birds, which led to their evolutionary radiation in the Early Cenozoic.

=== Locomotion ===
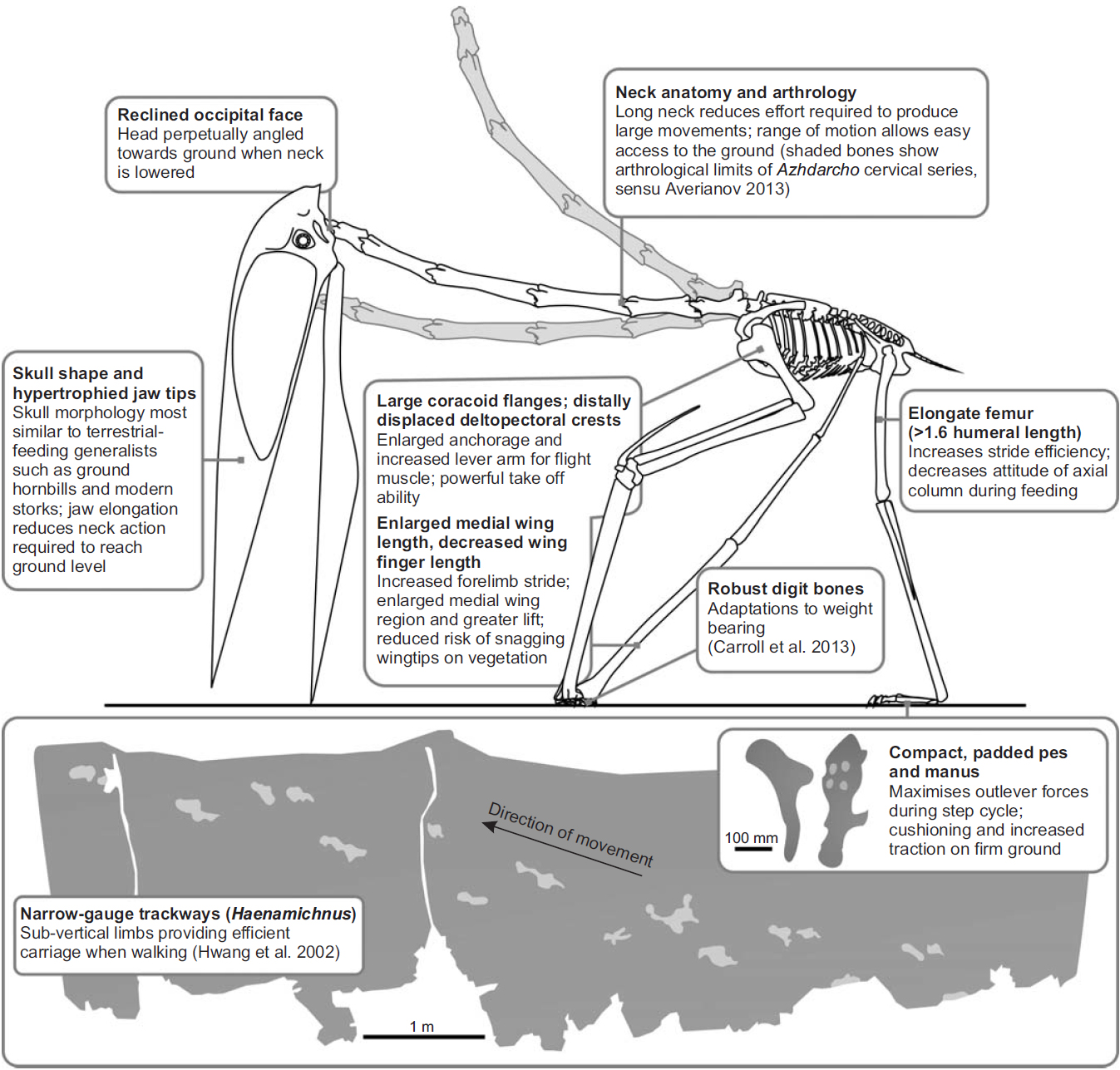
Skeleton of Zhejiangopterus used to illustrate the terrestrial stalking azhdarchid hypothesis, with the possible azhdarchid trackway Haenamichnus from Korea below

Witton summarized ideas about azhdarchid flight abilities in 2013, and noted they had generally been considered adapted for soaring, although some have found it possible their musculature allowed flapping flight like in swans and geese. Their short and potentially broad wings may have been suited for flying in terrestrial environments, as this is similar to some large, terrestrially soaring birds. Albatross-like soaring has also been suggested, but Witton thought this unlikely due to the supposed terrestrial bias of their fossils and adaptations for foraging on the ground. Studies of azhdarchid flight abilities indicate they would have been able to fly for long and probably fast (especially if they had an adequate amount of fat and muscle as nourishment), so that geographical barriers would not present obstacles.

Azhdarchids are also the only group of pterosaurs to which trackways have been assigned, such as Haenamichnus from Korea, which matches this group in shape, age, and size. One long trackway of this kind shows that azhdarchids walked with their limbs held directly underneath their body, and along with the morphology of their feet indicates they were more proficient on the ground than other pterosaurs. According to Witton, their proportions indicate they were not good swimmers on the other hand, and though they could probably launch from water, they were not as good at this as some other pterosaur groups.

== Paleoenvironment ==
Phosphatodraco is known from the "couche III" phosphatic unit of the Ouled Abdoun Basin in Morocco, which was deposited during the late Maastrichtian age of the Late Cretaceous period, which ended 66 million years ago. The phosphatic series is condensed and the Maastrichtian part is only 3 to 5 cm (1.2 to 2.0 in) thick. From the bottom to the top, "couche III" consists of thin phosphatic levels and marls, a grey limestone bed containing fish fossils, yellow, soft phosphates at the lower level, a thick, yellow marly level, separating the lower and upper "couche III", and gray, soft phosphates with brown stripes overlay in a thick marl level at upper "couche III". Pterosaur fossils are found in the lower part of the upper phosphatic unit. The kind of fossils that are usually used in biostratigraphy are rare, which complicates attempts at dating these beds, but "couche III" has been correlated with the late Maastrichtian based on shark teeth, which has also been confirmed by carbon and oxygen isotope stratigraphy. The phosphates were deposited in an embayment of the eastern Atlantic Ocean that flooded North Africa during the Late Cretaceous and Early Paleogene. The area would have been part of the Tethys Sea at the time.

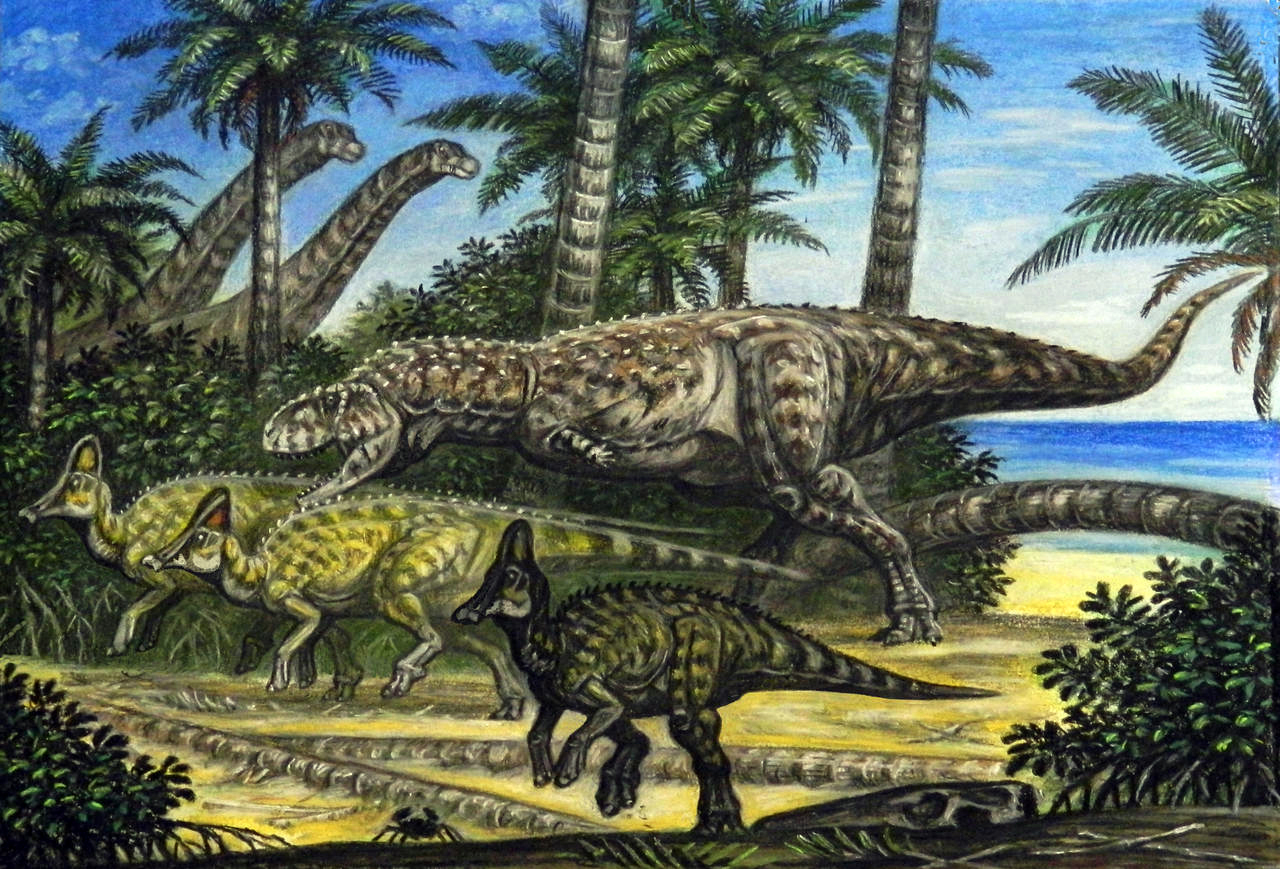
Speculative reconstruction of the contemporary Ouled Abdoun Basin fauna, including Ajnabia and Chenanisaurus

The phosphatic matrix of the original Phosphatodraco specimen is gray and mottled with orange, and contained fossils including of the fish Serratolamna, Rhombodus, and Enchodus, and the mosasaur Prognathodon, as well as small nodules. The specimen was found close to skeletal remains of an indeterminate mosasaur, and remains of sharks, rays, fish such as Stratodus, mosasaurs such as Platecarpus, Mosasaurus, and Halisaurus, indeterminate elasmosaurid plesiosaurs, and indeterminate bothremydid turtles have also been found at the site. This assemblage of animals suggests the sediments were deposited in a marine environment. Other contemporary pterosaurs from the Ouled Abdoun Basin include the pteranodontid Tethydraco (if it is not the same animal as Phosphatodraco), the nyctosaurids Alcione, Simurghia, and Barbaridactylus, a small azhdarchid similar to Quetzalcoatlus, and a very large azhdarchid which may be Arambourgiania. Dinosaurs are rare there, but the abelisaurid Chenanisaurus, the hadrosaur Ajnabia, and sauropod fossils are also known. Longrich and colleagues suggested in 2018 that, although the fauna was overwhelmingly marine, the presence of terrestrial dinosaurs and azhdarchids indicates the coast was nearby.

== See also ==
- List of pterosaur genera
- Timeline of pterosaur research
