= Handmade jewelry =

Unique pieces of jewelry made by hand

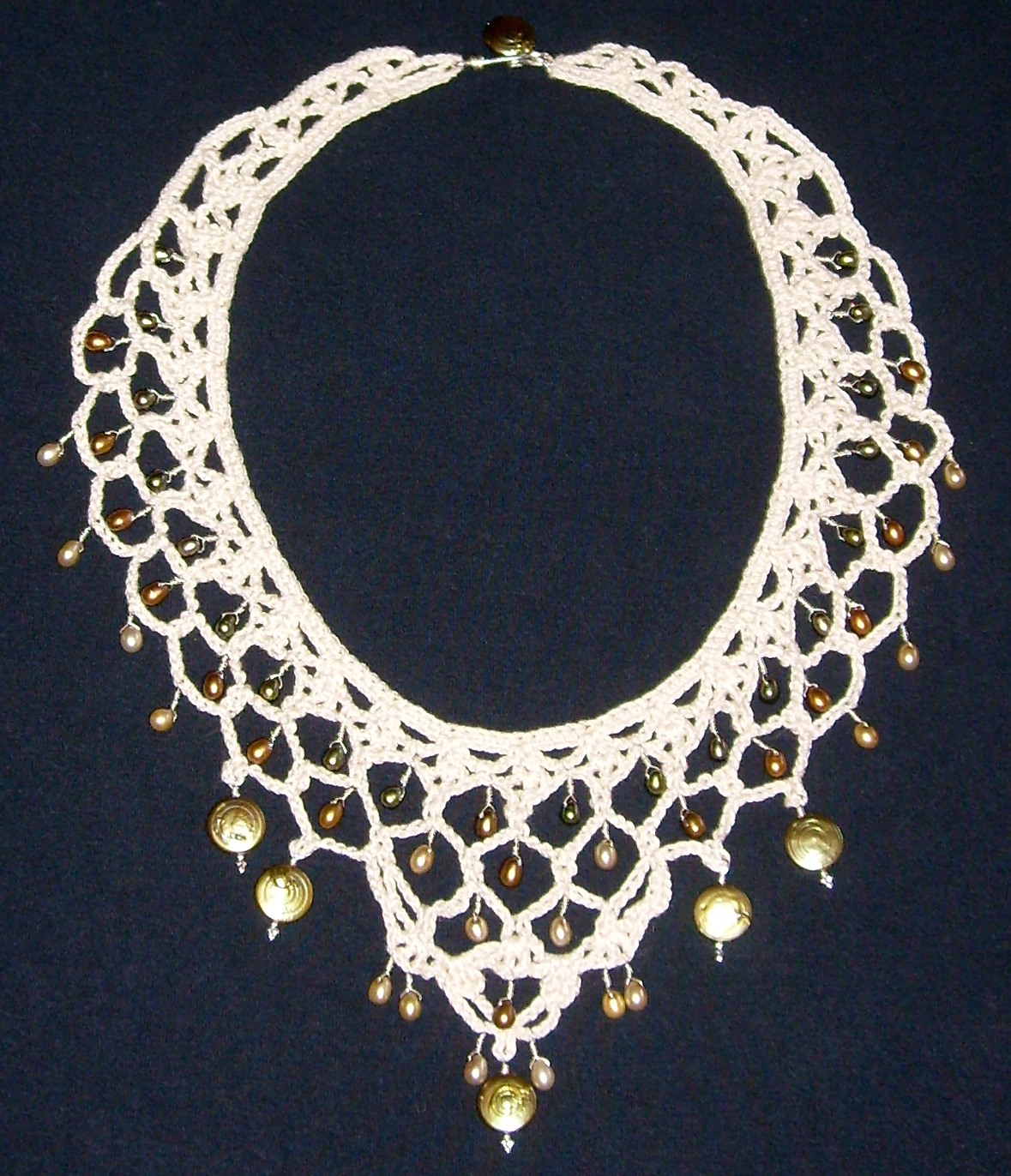
A bead crochet necklace made from crochet lace, sterling silver, and freshwater pearls

Video showing how to make handmade beaded earrings

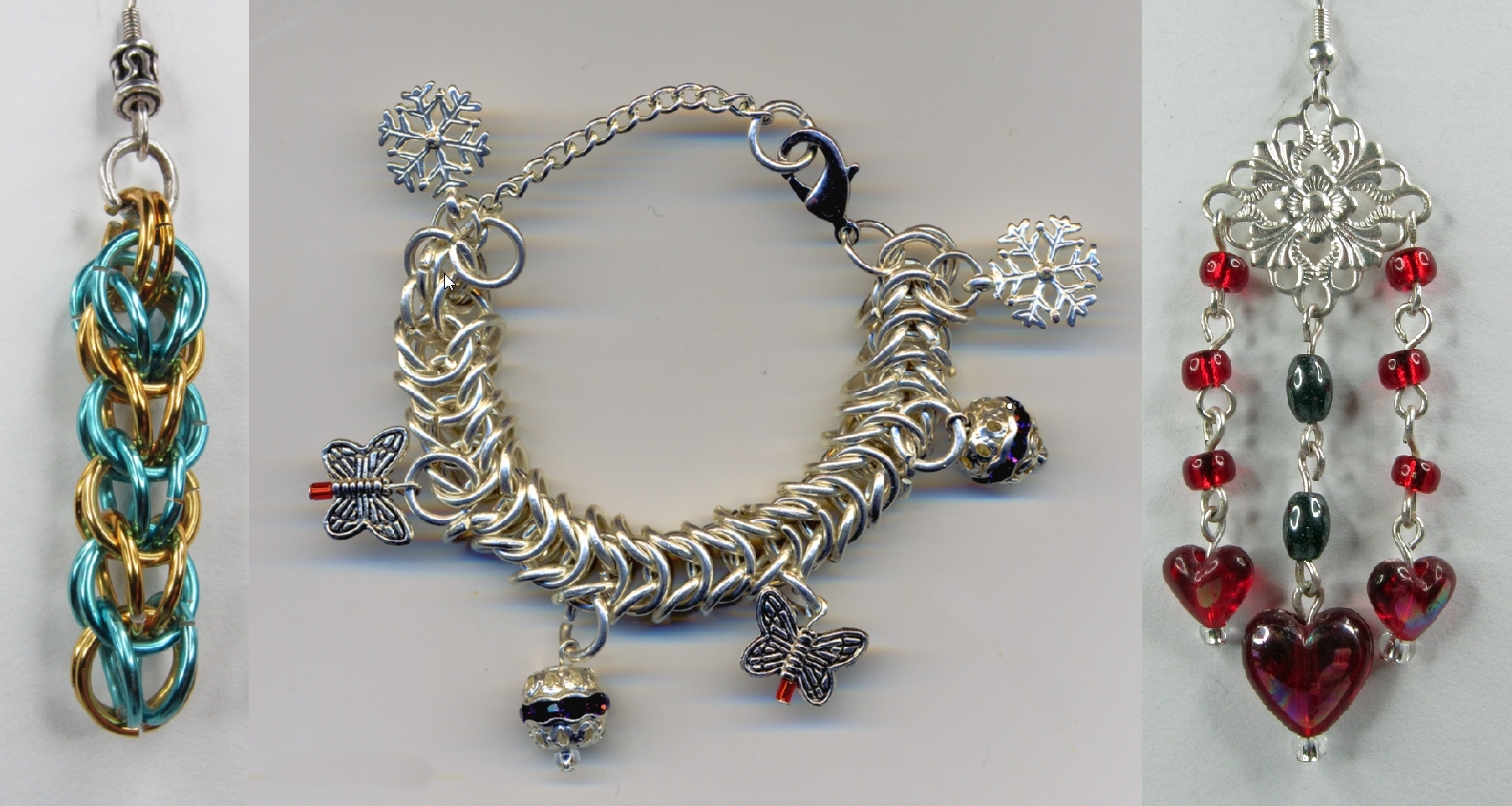
Three handmade jewelry items

Handmade jewelry/jewellery, or handcrafted jewelry/jewellery, is jewelry that has been assembled and formed by hand rather than through the use of machines.

The oldest handmade jewelry trademark is in Florence, Italy.

== Definition (U.S.) ==
According to the guidelines of the U.S. Federal Trade Commission, in order to be stamped or called "handmade" in United States, the work must be made solely by hand power or hand guidance. This means that jewelry may be made using drills, lathes, or other machinery, but it must be guided by the human hand.

This precludes the use of mass production procedures such as punch presses, CNC machinery, and casting, to name a few processes the use of which would make the jewelry not qualify as "handmade." Beyond that, handmade jewelry can be made out of any material and with a wide variety of techniques. Advantages: It allows exclusivity, as each item is unique, and it exhibits the individuality and craftsmanship of the artisan.

== Types ==
Handmade jewellery and handicrafts are a part of culture in many parts of the world. Handmade jewelry can be made using any materials and techniques provided they are manually done. Some of these handmade jewels are quite popular around the world. Based on the materials used and styles adopted, there are many types of handmade jewelry,

- Wire wrapped jewelry
- Beaded jewelry
- Fabricated jewelry
- Polymer clay jewelry
- Terracotta jewelry
- Handmade silver jewelry
- Handmade gold jewelry
- Handmade metallic jewelry
- Paper jewelry
- Wood Jewelry
- Resin Jewelry
- Crochet jewelry
- Enameled jewelry
- Engraved jewelry

== Awards ==
- American Gem Trade Association Spectrum Awards
- Gem Center Idar Oberstein Awards, named for Idar Oberstein.
- De Beers Awards

== See also ==
- Jewellery making topics
- Art jewelry
- Indie design
- Jewellery design
- Lapidary clubs
- Watchmaking
