= Moroccan fossil trade =

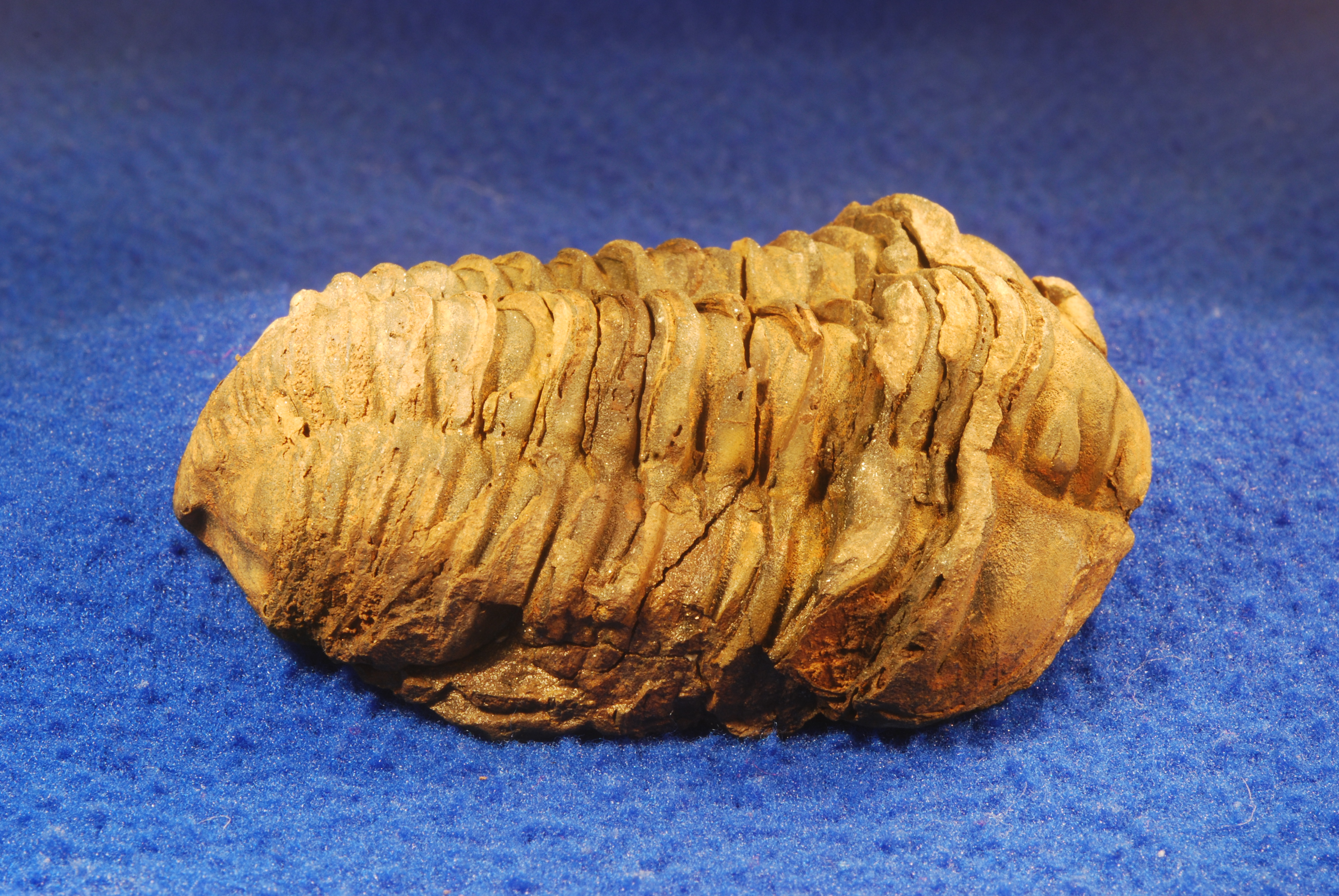
Flexicalymene ouzregui, a common Ordovician trilobite found in Morocco

The Moroccan fossil trade is the large industry surrounding the excavation, preparation and international sale of fossils from Morocco. Morocco contains some of the world's richest fossil sites and has seen international interest from fossil collectors since the early 20th century. As interest in collecting fossils grew in the late 20th century, the Moroccan fossil trade grew into a lucrative industry of its own. More than 50,000 Moroccans earn their living in mining, trading or exporting fossils and the industry itself is worth more than $40 million annually. The booming industry is so big that some commentators have referred to it as "fossil capitalism" or a "trilobite economy".

The fossil industry has been the source of various concerns. Some commentators worry that the industrial-scale excavations and insufficient governmental regulations are damaging Morocco's paleontological heritage. The export of fossils from Morocco is technically illegal, though the relevant laws are often not sufficient, or not applied in practice. There are also concerns for the safety and welfare of the fossil diggers themselves, who are often paid very little (considerably less than exporters and middlemen) and suffer through difficult working conditions. Scientific concerns have also been raised in that fossils may end up in the marketplace rather than available for scientific research, and that important fossils may be destroyed or neglected and lost due to being deemed to not be of commercial interest. The issue is made more complicated due to there not being any other jobs available for many of the fossil diggers themselves and the fossil industry ensures an income, however meager.

In addition to its economical impacts, Morocco's fossil trade has had some positive scientific impact. Many important scientific discoveries have been made based on Moroccan fossils. Without the markets and international trade network supporting the fossil diggers and preparators in Morocco, it is unlikely that as many new species would have been uncovered.

== History and economic impact ==
International interest in Moroccan fossils began in the early 20th century, with the French geologist Louis Gentil discovering trilobite fossils near Casablanca in 1916. Through the 20th century, local populations exploited Morocco's significant quantities of fossils by selling excavated specimens to collectors and tourists. The sale of fossils complemented the wages of local miners, and also provided a source of income for Moroccans in marginalized communities. Although the growth of the fossil market was slow at first, the industry grew rapidly in the late 1980s and early 1990s as fossil collecting became increasingly common, especially among young people. From the 2000s onwards, the Moroccan fossil trade has turned into a lucrative industry of its own. More than 50,000 Moroccans earned a living in the mineral and/or fossil mining and export trade, and the fossil industry is worth more than $40 million annually. A 2018 investigation by the French newspaper Le Monde uncovered that some Moroccan fossil exporters earn as much as $100 000 each year.

In some regions of Morocco, such as Tafilalt, there are few jobs outside of the fossil industry. The Moroccan fossil industry is so big that some, such as American geologist Douglas Shakel, have described the booming industry as a "trilobite economy". Some commentators, such as New York Times correspondent Lawrence Osborne in a 2000 article, have also used the term "fossil capitalism". Some mining businesses, such as the Moroccan company GSMC, combine traditional mining for raw materials, such as lead, copper and zinc, with the harvest and preparing of mineral and fossil specimens. The Moroccan fossil trade is a worldwide enterprise, with the largest importing market being the United States. Other large markets include Europe (particularly Germany), Australia and Japan. Most of the profit in the industry is earned by retailers and middleman, rather than the preppers and diggers in Morocco, who usually get paid very little. Economically, the industry does not only benefit Morocco, but also importers in Europe, America and Asia.

== Legality ==
Moroccan fossils can only be collected and exported with a permit from the competent authorities. Specifically, Article 116 of the 2015 Mining Code provides that permits are required for the extraction, collection, and commercialisation of fossils, meteorites, and mineralogical specimens. An application decree adopted in 2019 further specifies the procedures relating to these permits. The export of fossils is governed by Decree 1308-94 of April 19, 1994 which makes the export of certain kinds of goods subject to an export permit. Palaeontological objects are included under customs nomenclature number 97.05.00. However, Moroccan laws do allow artisanal mining by locals, which is exploited by the fossil industry. Moreover, Morocco is a party to the 1970 UNESCO Convention on the Means of Prohibiting and Preventing the Illicit Import, Export and Transfer of Ownership of Cultural Property (ratified on February 3, 2003) and the 1995 UNIDROIT Convention on Stolen or Illegally Exported Cultural Objects (ratified on August 3, 2022).

However, the laws are often insufficient or not applied in practice. According to a 2019 article by the organization ENACT Africa, it is possible that authorities are complicit, given the large amount of fossils that pass through Moroccan customs. There is little international regard for these legislations either, given that many Moroccan fossils can be traced to museums worldwide.

The existence of a large organized and technically illegal system could pose a threat to Morocco's development and security, as it points to loopholes in Morocco's export control, raising the possibility that other forms of trafficking may be occurring in the country. Additionally, the system also implies people in marginalized regions of the country being exploited, as the fossil diggers themselves typically earn very little compared to the exporters and middlemen. The issue is made more complicated given that many locals rely on the fossil trade to make a living, given the lack of other available jobs.

New fossil legislation was proposed by the Ministry of Energy, Mines and Sustainable Development in 2019, with a draft decree suggesting the establishment of three different legally recognized categories of fossils: 'regular' specimens that can be excavated and sold without the need of authorization, quota-regulated specimens that require authorization and unique specimens that can only leave the country if loaned for scientific purposes.

== Fossils and excavation ==
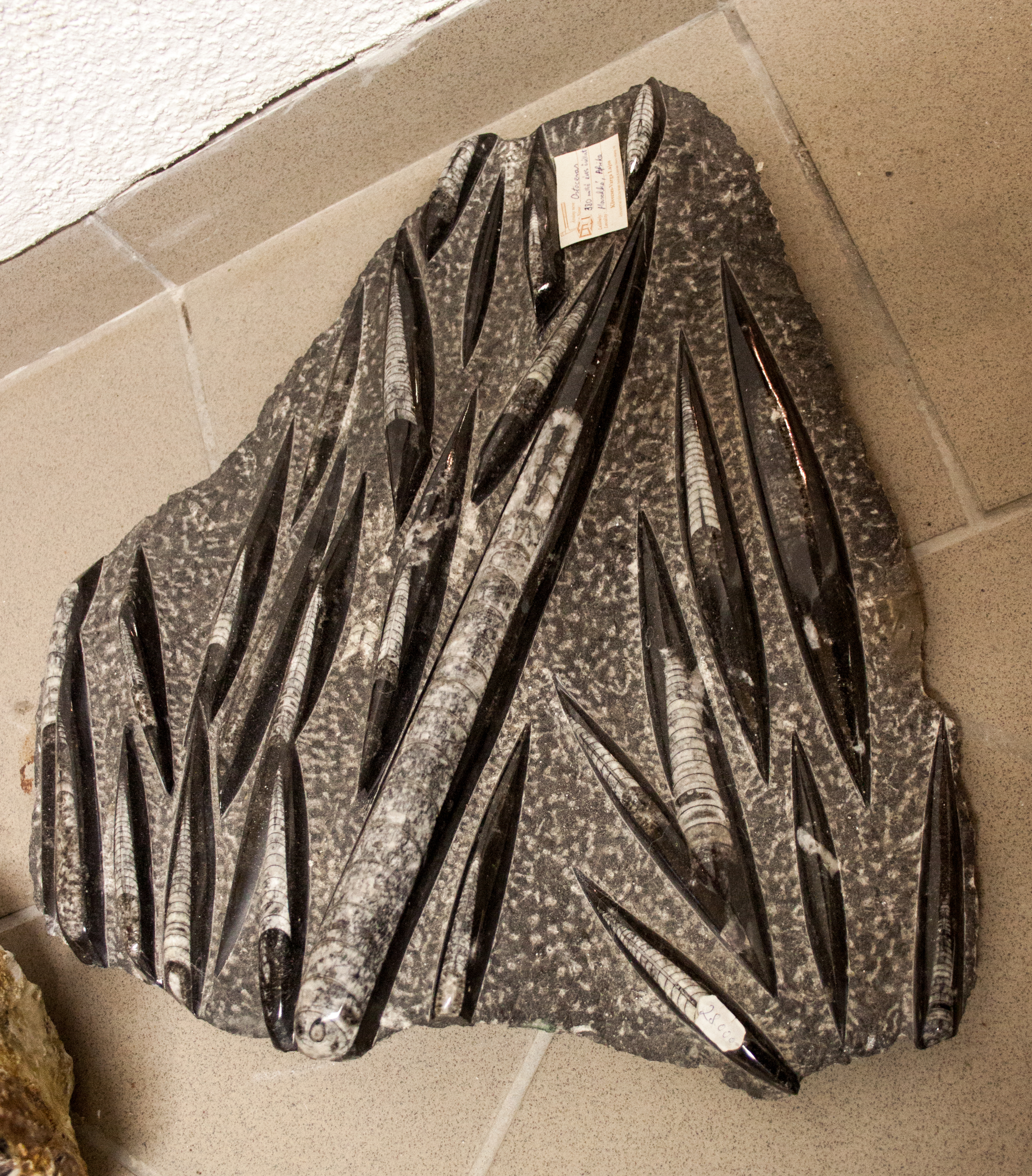
Polished slab of orthocerid (straight-shelled) nautiloid cephalopod fossils from Morocco.

Mining for fossils in Morocco is a labor-intense and delicate process since fossils, intended to be sold as scientific curiosities, or in cases even as natural works of art, have to be retrieved from the ground undamaged. Typically, teams of people, many of them local Berber tribesmen with deep regional roots, work in small trenches and pits with picks, chisels and shovels. Each fossil digger, numbering in the thousands, typically has their own spot, and leaves their equipment there each night. After having been extracted from the earth, locals clean and prepare the fossils for sale. Typically, middlemen gather in larger towns, such as Erfoud, to purchase bulks of fossil and mineral specimens and export them across the world.

The most common and famous finds are trilobites and the nautiloid cephalopod including the orthocerid order of extinct Silurian-Devonian orthoceratoid cephalopods. Nautiloid cephalopods are often found in huge numbers in black limestone, and their fossils, often polished along with the surrounding stone, are sold either as scientific curiosities, or fashioned into various ornamental shapes. Moroccan fossils embedded within the black limestone is in cases fashioned into furniture, such as ornamental sinks, bathtubs, or coffee tables.

=== Trilobites ===
Moroccan trilobites are sought after by both amateur paleontologists and museums. Hundreds of trilobite species, many not found elsewhere, have been found in Morocco, from between 570 and 245 million years ago. In total, the country may be home to 300–400 different species. The pricing for fossil trilobites depend on several factors, including the condition of the fossils, the rarity of the species and the time spent on excavation and preparation. Common species may be sold for just one or two US dollars, but rare high-quality specimens have been sold for as much as $20,000 or more. The surge in collecting Moroccan trilobites might be attributable to the sheer diversity found, with the market never stagnating due to new forms being found each year. The large number of trilobites found and exported also ensures that collectors can compare and cross-reference their specimens. Compared to collecting high-end items such as impressionist paintings, the fossil industry is also a relatively new frontier, with an as of yet not exhausted supply.

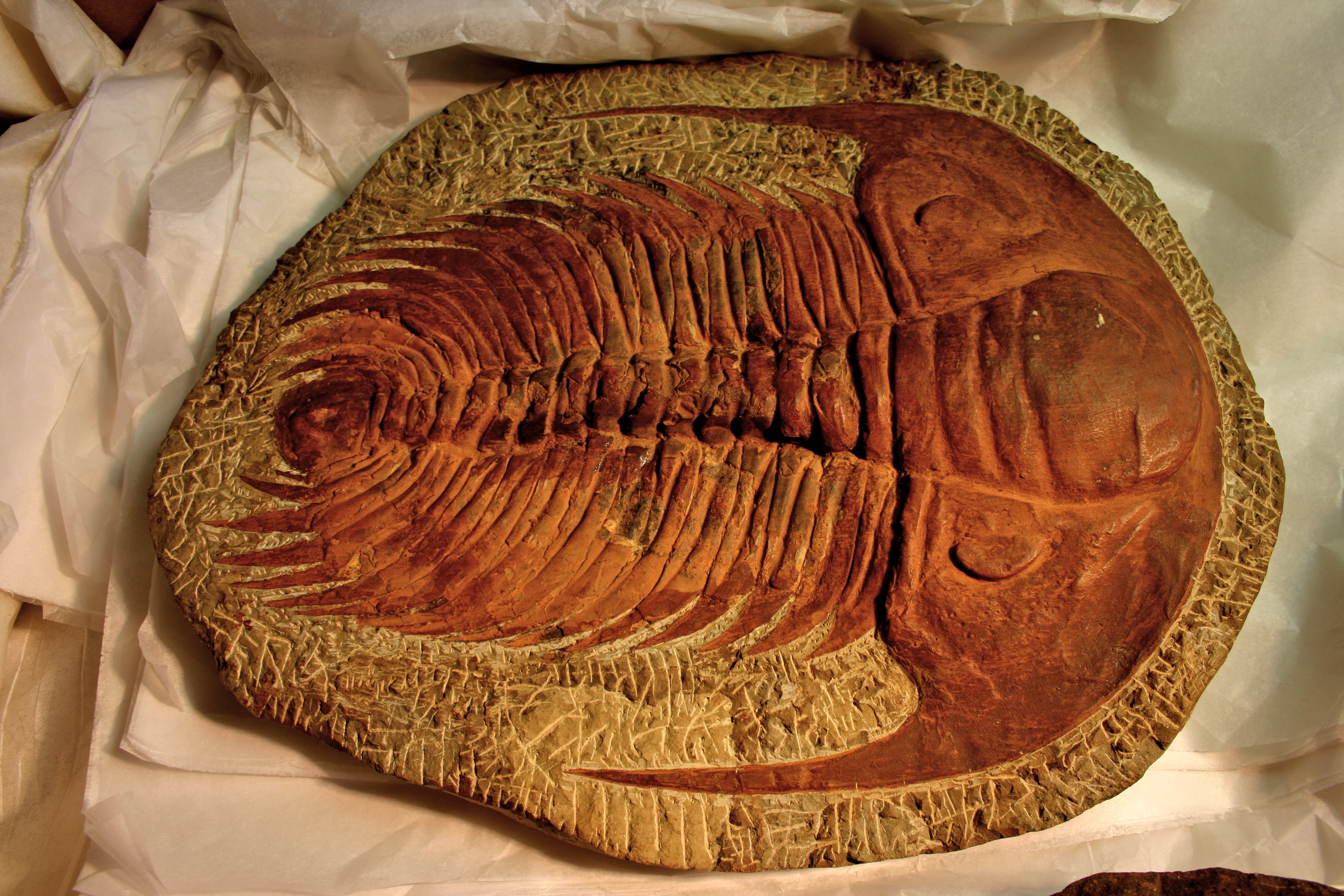
Paradoxides trilobite fossil from Morocco

Most of the trilobite specimens from Morocco that end up in the international market have some amount of restoration, given that they are rarely found in perfect condition. Many trilobite fossils are broken due to excavators cracking open rocks, and are then glued back together before being sold. Sometimes, trilobites can be entirely fake, made from plaster or other materials, such as local muds or car putty. Fake trilobites are often well-made, molded with molds made from actual fossil specimens, and they can thus be difficult to tell from real fossils, sometimes even fooling trilobite experts. Making fake fossils is not illegal in Morocco. Passing fakes of as real is illegal, but the act itself being legal creates an overall legal grey area which allows the practice to endure.

Sometimes, craftsmen combine different broken trilobites together to create "chimera" specimens that never actually lived. In some cases, fakers may also start out with real specimens but add on features, such as an extended nose or spikes, to make it appear more unusual. At times fossil specimens are partially real and partially fake, for instance fossils where the heads and tails are real, but the body has been fashioned out of plastic. Trilobites of the genus Paradoxides have been noted as particularly susceptible to having had work done on them, given that many original specimens are very fragile. It is not uncommon for Moroccan trilobite specimens to be about 20–25 % 'restored', with the rest being real fossil material. It is also not uncommon to combine real, or partially real, specimens into composites, with fossils found at different locations being 'mis-matched' closely together onto a single stone plate, termed 'trilobite pizzas' by collectors.

The authenticity of a fossil trilobite can usually be determined by examining it for air bubbles using a UV flashlight. According to the American Museum of Natural History, fossil collectors should in general not be worried about the authenticity of fossil trilobite specimens, given that a sharp eye and knowledge of trilobite morphology can eliminate most fakes. According to the museum, "The fact remains, that nowhere else on Planet Earth are more spectacular and fascinating legitimate trilobite specimens coming to light than in Morocco. For a collector or scientist to turn their backs on such a proven treasure trove of material would appear to be both foolish and unnecessary."

=== Dinosaur fossils ===
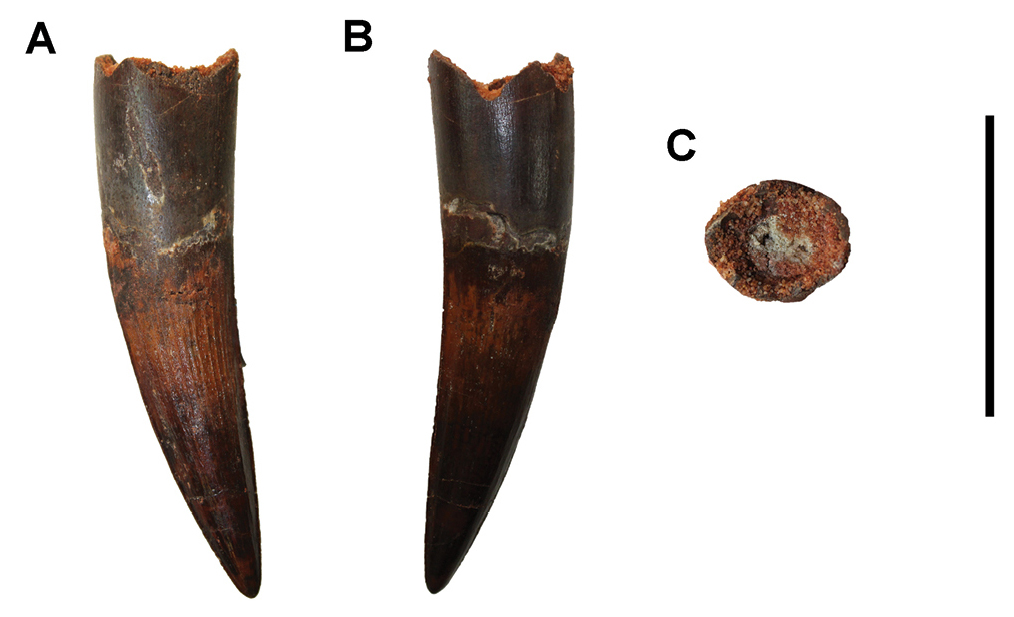
Tooth of Spinosaurus from the Kem Kem Group in Morocco

Dinosaur fossils are relatively common in Morocco compared to in many other countries, especially in the Cretaceous-age Kem Kem beds. Fossils in good condition, such as more complete specimens, are extraordinarily rare given that most of the Cretaceous fossil sites were once tumultuous river beds. Nearly all fossils are isolated bone fragments or teeth. The abundance of teeth partly results from the fact that dinosaurs continually lost and replaced teeth throughout their lives, similar to modern crocodiles. Thousands of dinosaur fossils are found in and exported from Morocco every year. Among Moroccan dinosaur teeth, teeth of the theropod dinosaur Spinosaurus are especially common, likely resulting from Spinosaurus spending most of their time in the rivers, rather than along the river banks. In one fossil site examined by paleontologists in 2014, Spinosaurus teeth accounted for nearly half of all the fossil teeth recovered, and about a sixth of the total recovered fossils. Teeth of other dinosaurs are considerably more rare, with the fossil Spinosaurus teeth of one site outnumbering the teeth of other dinosaurs by about 150 to one.

== Impact on scientific research ==
Some experts worry that the Moroccan fossil industry "exploits Morocco's paleontogical heritage". The fossil beds around the desert town of Erfoud in Morocco have been termed the "largest open air fossil museum in the world" due to the abundance of finds, being one of the world's richest fossil sites, but they are threatened today due to excessive excavations and insufficient regulations owing to the illegal fossil trade. The fossil industry may thus be causing irreversible damage to local paleontological heritage and conservation efforts. In addition to legal and scientific concerns, the Moroccan fossil industry also has welfare concerns, given that fossil diggers work for hours in the hot Sahara sun, breathing in potentially dangerous dust and risking accidents from the common rock collapses.

In some cases, rare fossil specimens end up in marketplaces instead of becoming available for scientific study. For instance, fossils likely belonging to the rare mosasaur species Pluridens walkeri, otherwise unknown in Morocco, have been found in the Gantour Basin but scientists have been unable to study them on account of all known specimens having been sold on the black market. Another cause of concern is that associated fossil material, such as partial skeletons, are often overlooked by commercial collectors since they do not employ field jackets or lab preparation. As such, fossil bones that would have been significant if associated together may be disassociated over the course of excavation and sold individually. Because of poor collecting practices, many fossils are damaged and there is often no information recorded on stratigraphy, sedimentology or location. This is not a universal rule, however, as some Moroccan collectors do record relevant information.

Fossils that are believed by the Moroccan fossil diggers to not hold any commercial value are often neglected and become unrecoverable. In combination with collectorship biases in museums (museums tend to prioritize collecting rare and impressive specimens and tend to not build large collections of common specimens), collectorship biases among Moroccan fossil collectors have in cases resulted in erroneous paleoecological interpretations, such as the prevalent idea that the Kem Kem beds preserve an unusually large number of predatory dinosaurs, with a skewed predator-prey ratio.

On the positive side, paleontologists have made many important discoveries based on the fossils uncovered in Morocco, such as the identification of hundreds of new species of trilobites and other animals both vertebrates and invertebrates. Without the markets and industries that support the excavators and preparators in Morocco, a large number of these new species would likely never have been uncovered. In cases, new species have been named in honor of people in the fossil industry, such as the trilobite Asteropyge tahiri and the artiopod Eoduslia brahimtahiri, both named after Brahim Tahiri, a Moroccan fossil exporter and the owner of the only private fossil museum in Morocco.

== Fossil repatriation efforts ==
In recent years, the Moroccan government has been increasingly proactive in pursuing the return of trafficked Moroccan fossils to their country of origin.

- During a ceremony on 13 May 2024, Chile handed back 117 fossils which had been seized between 2017 and 2022 to Morocco.
- In early 2022, Morocco recovered the skull of a 56 million-year-old crocodile skull from the U.S. where it had been seized alongside around 7,000 other artifacts in a raid on a farm in Indiana in 2014.
- On 26 February 2021, France returned around 25,000 objects of archaeological and palaeontological interest to Morocco. These items had been confiscated by the Perpignan and Arles customs brigades in 2005 and 2006.
- In April 2017, the skeleton of a Zarafasaura oceanis, a 66 million-year-old plesiosaur, was returned from France. It had been withdrawn from auction at Hôtel Drouot in late February 2017.
