= National Fossil Day =

Environmental awareness day

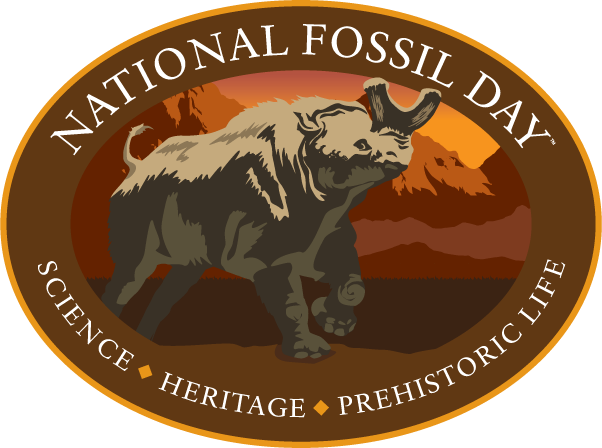
- The official National Fossil Day logo, featuring Megacerops
- Observed by: United States
- Type: National
- Frequency: Annual
- First time: 2010

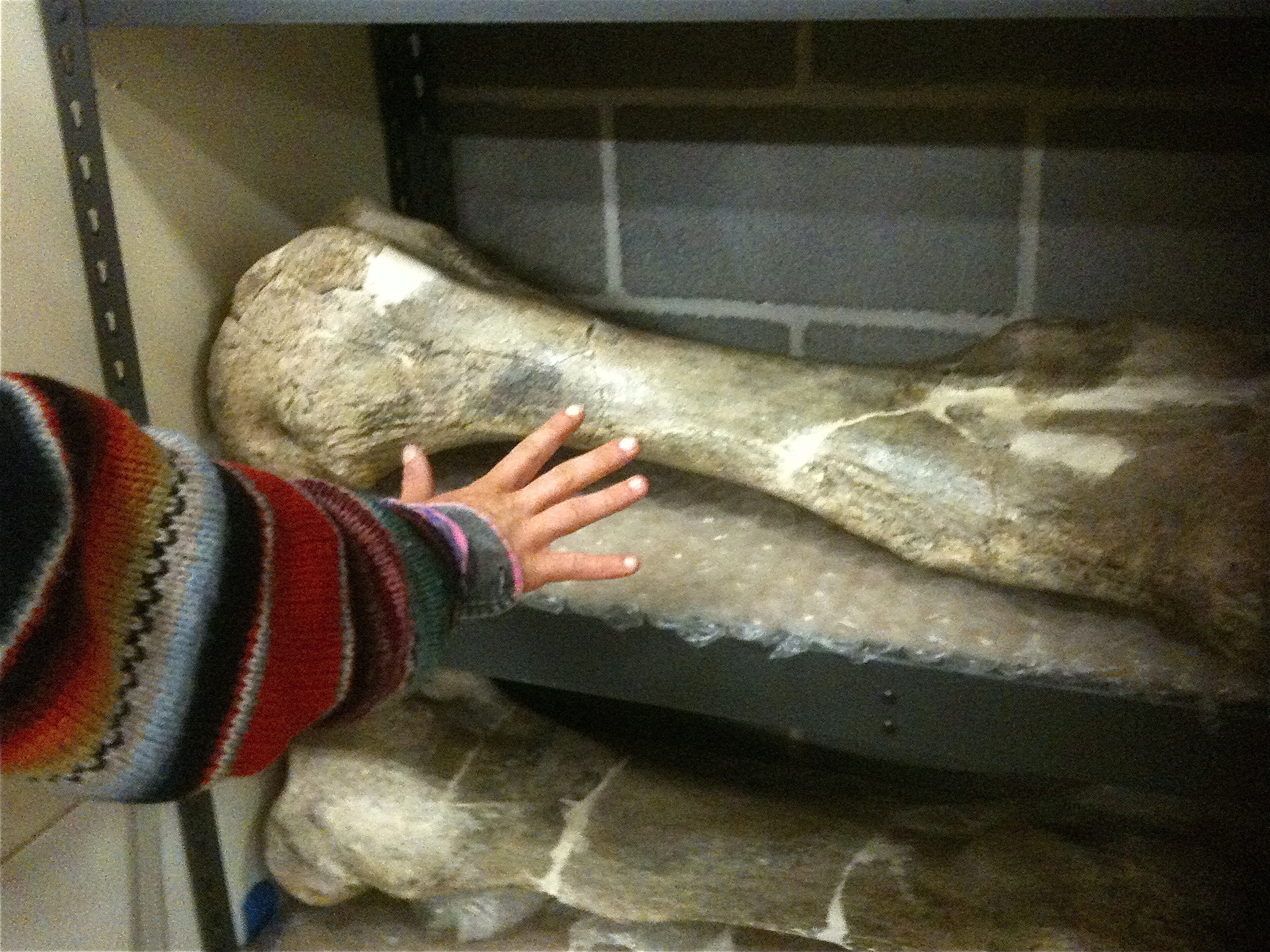
A mastodon tibia, National Fossil Day 2011

National Fossil Day was established in the United States by the National Park Service in 2010 as a celebration and partnership to promote the scientific and educational values of fossils. The first annual National Fossil Day was hosted on October 13, 2010, as a fossil-focused day during Earth Science Week. The National Park Service, the American Geosciences Institute, and more than 385 partners, including museums, institutions, science and teacher organizations, agencies, fossil sites, amateur fossil groups and other entities, joined in a partnership to educate the public about fossils, the science of paleontology and America's Paleontological Heritage. There are National Fossil Day partners in all 50 states providing opportunities for educational outreach and hosting hundreds of fossil-themed activities at the local level.

National Park Service senior paleontologist Vincent L. Santucci is considered the "Father of National Fossil Day" and first proposed the concept of National Fossil Day in 2009 as a nationwide celebration for fossils in the United States. Santucci reached out to Geoff Camphire and Ann Benbow at the American Geosciences Institute (AGI) seeking support to establish National Fossil Day as a dedicated day during Earth Science Week. Once the idea of National Fossil Day was approved, dozens of organizations and museums joined this partnership including the Geological Society of America, Paleontological Society, Society of Vertebrate Paleontology, Smithsonian, and American Museum of Natural History. The National Fossil Day Celebration on the National Mall in Washington, D.C., was the kickoff event hosted on October 13, 2010. The event captured widespread media and public attention throughout the U.S.

The second National Fossil Day 2011 was observed on October 12, 2011, with events at museums, parks, universities, and non-profit organizations. National Fossil Day 2012 was celebrated on October 17, 2012, with an opening event held on the National Mall in Washington, D.C. Similar events have been held annually. An annual National Fossil Day Art Contest is hosted by the National Park Service and the National Fossil Day Partnership. The theme for the year is announced in the spring and people of all ages are invited to submit fossil-inspired, original artwork.
