= Lapidary club =

Type of organization

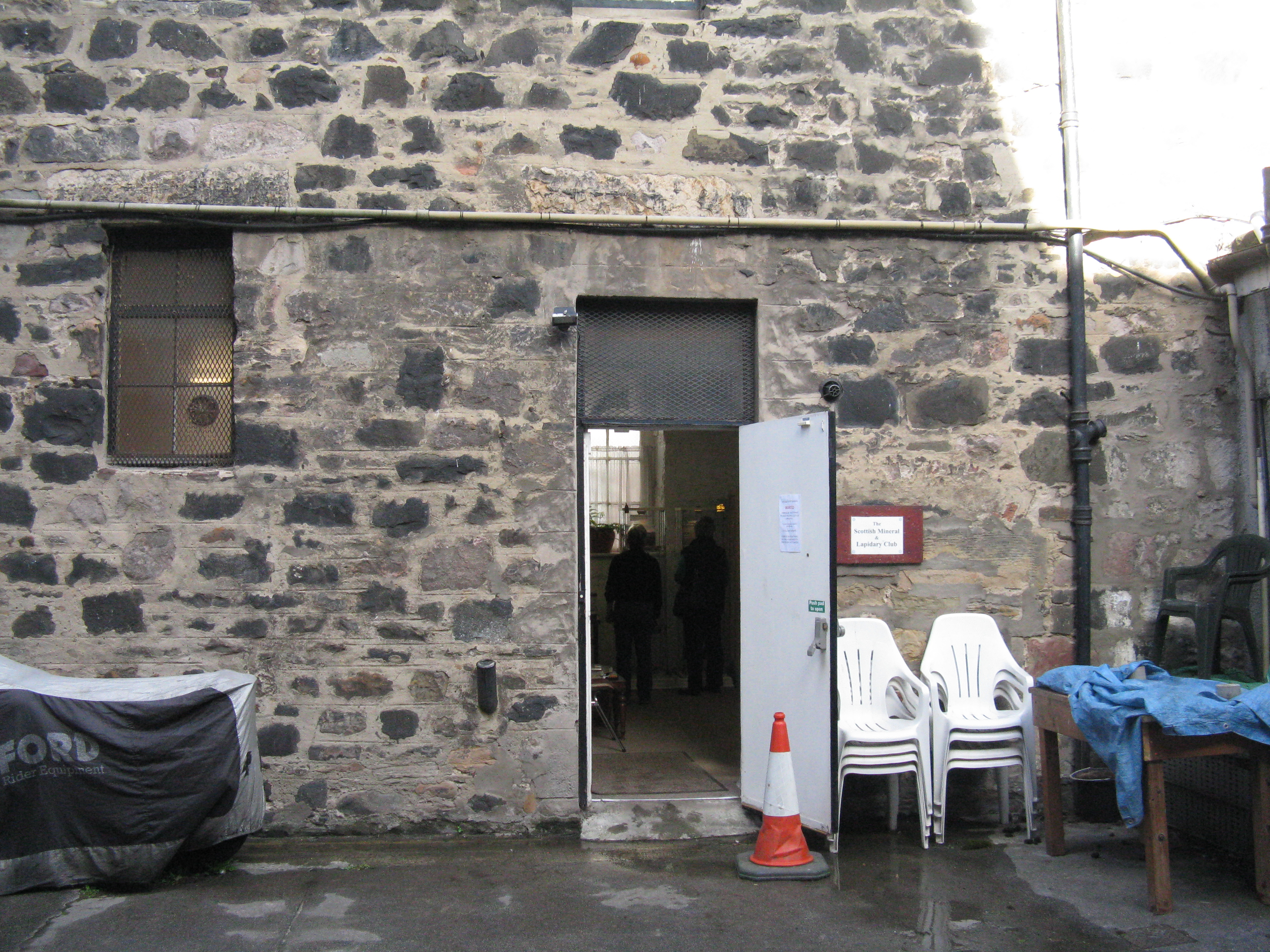
A Scottish lapidary club

Lapidary clubs promote popular interest and education in lapidary, the craft of shaping stone, minerals, and gemstones. These clubs sponsor and provide means for their members to engage in various forms of jewellery making, cabochon cutting and faceting, carving, glass beadmaking, and craft work. The clubs also promote and facilitate healthy outdoor activities in the form of field trips to various fossicking locations for the purpose of collecting gemstones or mineral specimens. Lapidary is particularly popular in the United States and Australia where large numbers of clubs were formed in the 1950s and 1960s.

In Australia, the most prominent body of lapidary clubs is the Australian Federation of Lapidary & Allied Crafts Associations Inc. (AFLACA). AFLACA has eight member organisations which together represent several hundred lapidary and related clubs across Australia.

Each year AFLACA holds its GEMBOREE which is a national Gem, Lapidary and Mineral Competition and Show which in addition to exhibitions and displays includes Lapidary Club members competing for awards in a range of lapidary categories.
