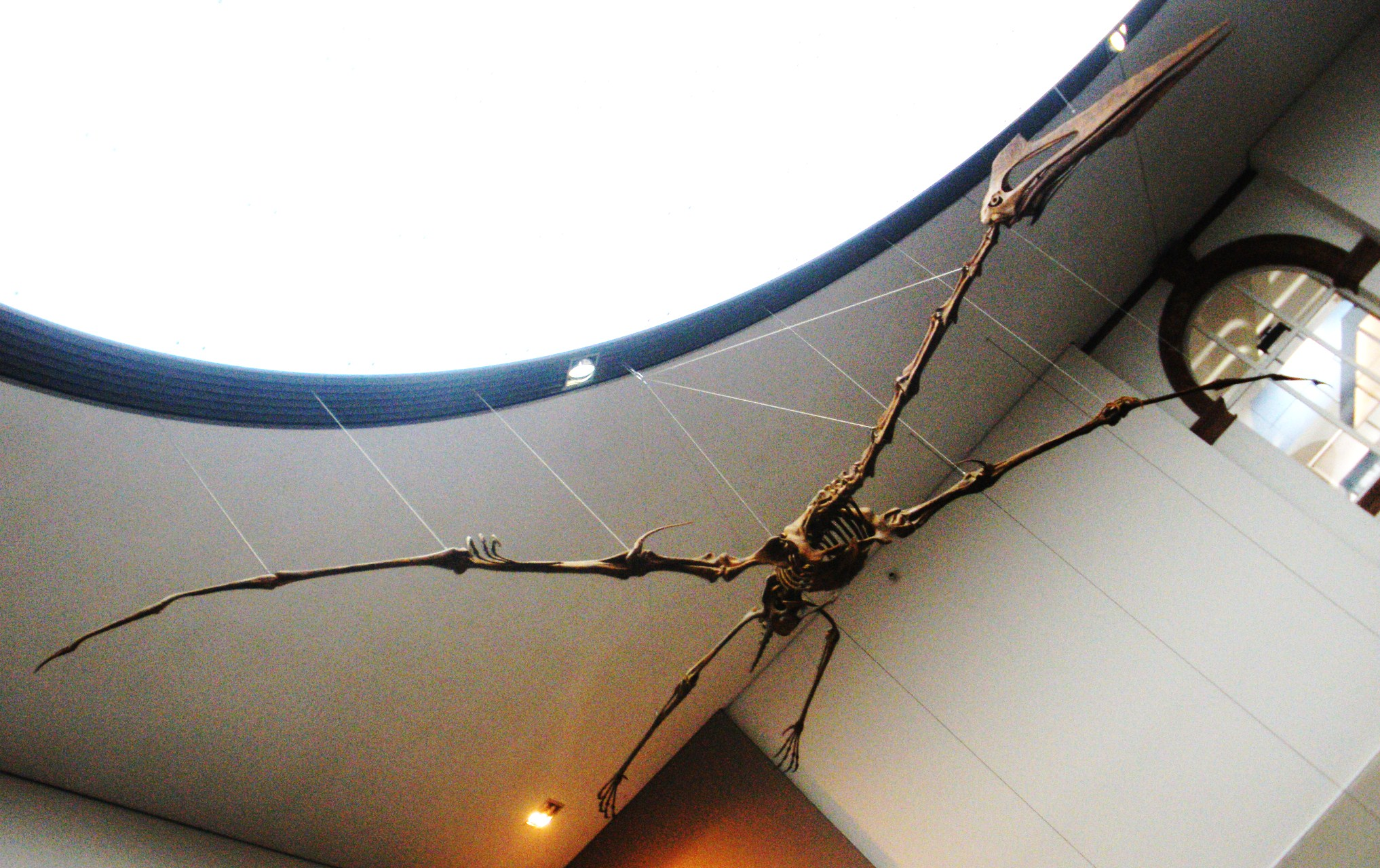
- Skeletal mount of Q. northropi at Senckenberg Museum

Scientific classification
- Kingdom: Animalia
- Phylum: Chordata
- Class: Reptilia
- Order: †Pterosauria
- Suborder: †Pterodactyloidea
- Clade: †Azhdarchoidea
- Family: †Azhdarchidae
- Clade: †Serpennata
- Genus: †Quetzalcoatlus; Lawson, 1975

Type species
- †Quetzalcoatlus northropi Lawson, 1975

Other species
- †Q.? lawsoni Andres and Langston Jr., 2021

Synonyms
- Pteranodon gigas Lawson, 1972

= Quetzalcoatlus =

Quetzalcoatlus Temporal range: Late Cretaceous (Maastrichtian), 68–66 Ma

Genus of azhdarchid pterosaurs from the Late Cretaceous

Quetzalcoatlus (/kɛtsəlkoʊˈætləs/) is a genus of azhdarchid pterosaur that lived during the Maastrichtian age of the Late Cretaceous in North America. The type specimen, recovered in 1971 from the Javelina Formation of Texas, United States, consists of several wing fragments and was described as Quetzalcoatlus northropi in 1975 by Douglas Lawson. The generic name refers to the Aztec serpent god of the sky, Quetzalcōātl, while the specific name honors Jack Northrop, designer of a tailless fixed-wing aircraft. The remains of a second species were found between 1972 and 1974, also by Lawson, around 40 km (25 mi) from the Q. northropi locality. In 2021, these remains were assigned to the name Quetzalcoatlus lawsoni by Brian Andres and (posthumously) Wann Langston Jr., as part of a series of publications on the genus.

Quetzalcoatlus northropi has gained fame as a candidate for the largest flying animal ever discovered, though estimating its size has been difficult due to the fragmentary nature of the only known specimen. While wingspan estimates over the years have ranged from 5.2–25.8 m (17–85 ft), more recent estimates hover around 10–11 m (33–36 ft). Previously, smaller azhdarchid specimens were referred to the species Q. lawsoni, though other researchers have questioned the placement of this species within the genus.

Historical interpretations of the diet of Quetzalcoatlus have ranged from scavenging to skim-feeding like the modern skimmer bird. However, more recent research has found that it most likely hunted small prey on the ground, in a similar way to storks and ground hornbills. This has been dubbed the terrestrial stalking hypothesis and is thought to be a common feeding behavior among large azhdarchids. On the other hand, the disputed second species, Q. lawsoni, appears to have been associated with alkaline lakes, and a diet of small aquatic invertebrates has been suggested. Similarly, while Q. northropi is speculated to have been fairly solitary, Q. lawsoni appears to have been highly gregarious (social). Azhdarchids like Quetzalcoatlus were highly terrestrial by pterosaur standards, though even the largest were nonetheless capable of flight. Based on the work of Mark P. Witton and Michael Habib in 2010, it now seems likely that pterosaurs, especially larger taxa such as Quetzalcoatlus, launched quadrupedally (from a four-legged posture), using the powerful muscles of their forelimbs to propel themselves off the ground and into the air.

== Research history and taxonomy ==
=== Discovery and naming ===
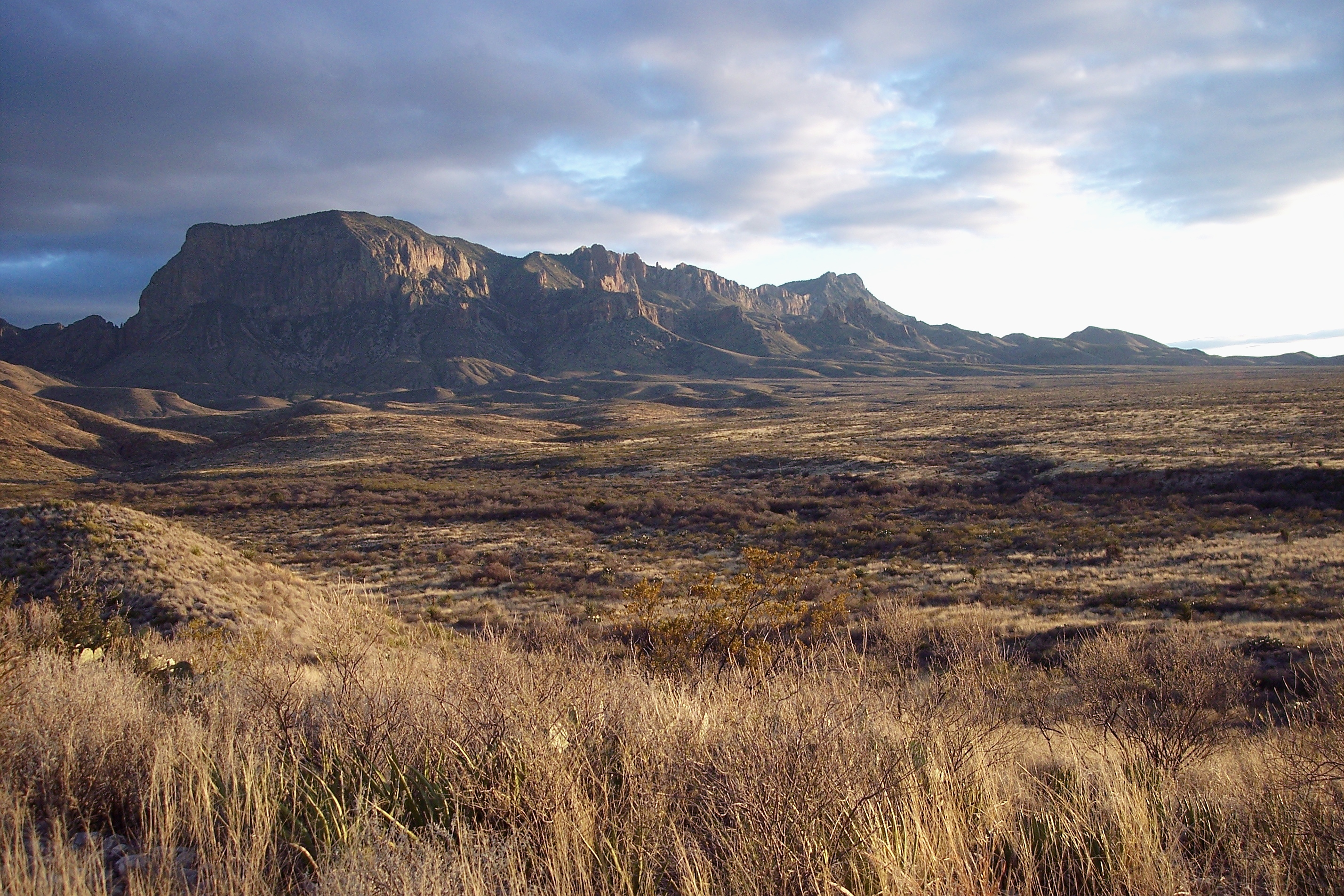
The known fossils of Quetzalcoatlus were discovered in Big Bend National Park, Texas

The genus Quetzalcoatlus is based on fossils discovered in rocks pertaining to the Late Cretaceous Javelina Formation in Big Bend National Park, Texas. Remains of dinosaurs and other prehistoric life had been found in the area since the beginning of the 20th century. The first Quetzalcoatlus fossils were discovered in 1971 by the graduate student Douglas A. Lawson while conducting field work for his Master's degree project on the paleoecology of the Javelina Formation. This field work was supervised by Wann Langston Jr., an experienced paleontologist who had been doing field work in the region since 1938 and since 1963 led expeditions through his position as curator at the Texas Science and Natural History Museum. (Note: At that time known as the Texas Memorial Museum) The two had first visited the park together in March 1970, with Lawson discovering the first Tyrannosaurus rex fossil from Texas. Returning in 1971, Lawson discovered a 3 ft (0.91 m) bone while investigating an arroyo on the western edge of the park, and returned to Austin with a 1 ft (0.30 m) section of it. He and Langston then identified it as a pterosaur fossil based on its hollow internal structure with thin walls. Returning in November 1971 for further excavations, they were struck by the unprecedented size of the remains compared to known pterosaurs. The initial material consisted of a giant radius and ulna, two fused wristbones known as syncarpals, and the end of the wing finger. Altogether, the material comprised a partial left wing from an individual (specimen number TxVP 41450-3) later estimated at over 10 m (33 ft) in wingspan. Lawson described the remains in his 1972 thesis as "Pteranodon gigas", and diagnosed it as being "nearly twice as large as any previously described species of Pteranodon". As a thesis is not recognized as a published work by the International Code for Zoological Nomenclature (ICZN), "Pteranodon gigas" is not a valid name. Further field work at the site was conducted in March 1973, when fragments were found alongside a long and delicate bone connected to an apparently larger element. This fossil was left in the ground until April 1974, when they fully excavated the larger element, a humerus. Due to the close association of discovered remains, Langston felt confident there was nothing more to be found at the site. Several later excavations of the site have indeed been unsuccessful.

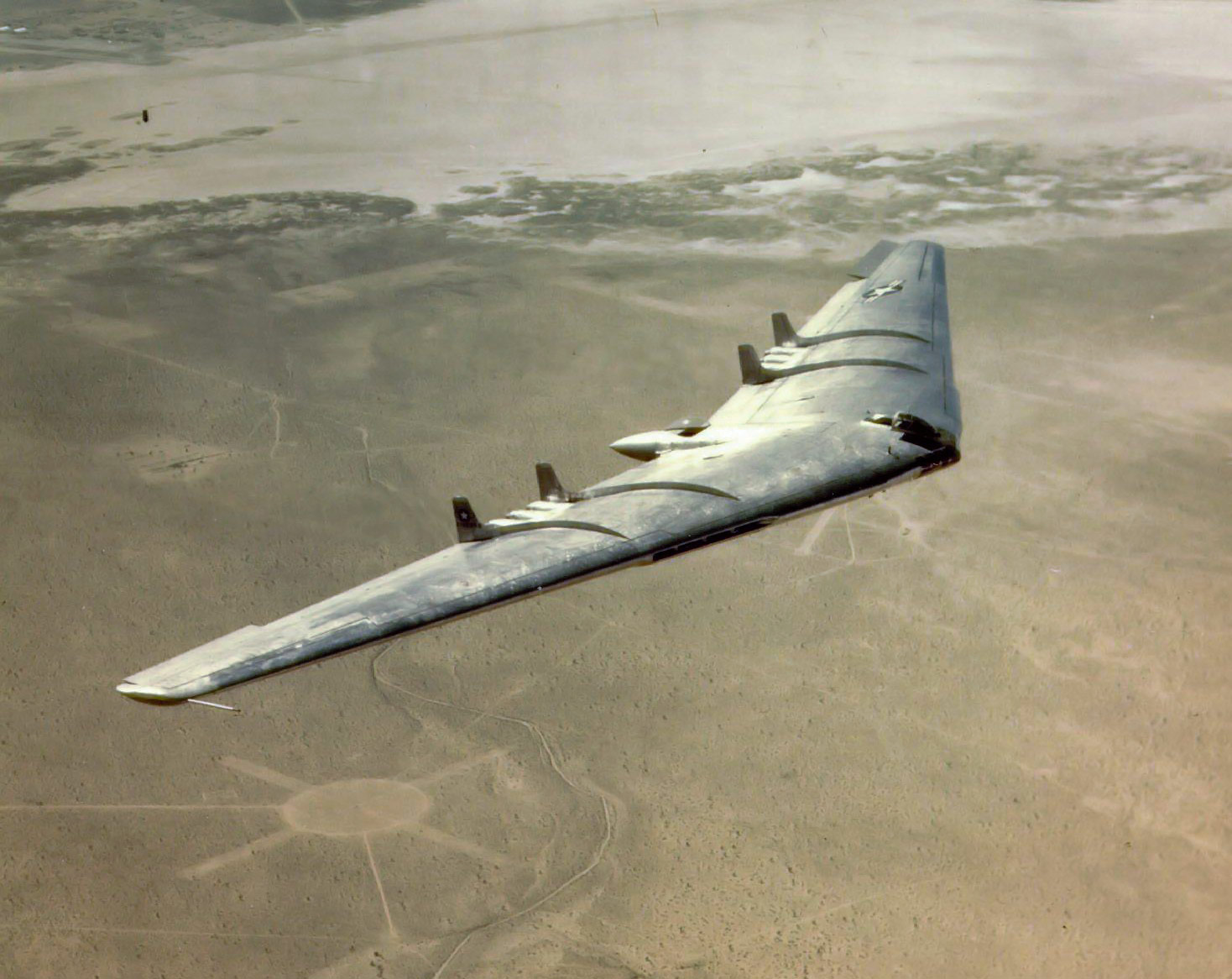
The name of Q. northropi refers to its similar appearance to aircraft designed by John Knudsen Northrop

Lawson announced his discovery in the journal Science in March 1975, with a depiction of the animal's size compared to a large aircraft and a Pteranodon gracing the cover of the issue. Lawson wrote that it was "without doubt the largest flying animal presently known". He illustrated and briefly described the remains known at the time, but did not offer a name and indicated that a more extensive description was in preparation that would diagnose the species. In May, he submitted to the journal a short response to his original paper considering how such an enormous animal could have flown. Within the paper, he briefly established the name Quetzalcoatlus northropi, but still did not provide a diagnosis or a more detailed description, which would later cause nomenclatural problems. Though not specified in the original publication, Lawson named the genus after the Aztec feathered serpent god Quetzalcōātl, while the specific name honors John Knudsen Northrop, the founder of Northrop Corporation, who drove the development of large tailless Northrop YB-49 aircraft designs resembling Quetzalcoatlus. The discovery of the giant pterosaur left a strong impression on both the scientific community and the general public, and was reported on throughout the world. It was featured in Time Magazine and appeared on the cover of Scientific American in 1981 alongside an article on pterosaurs by Langston. The species would become referenced by over 500 scientific publications, with Quetzalcoatlus northropi becoming the single most cited pterosaur species and Quetzalcoatlus the fourth most cited pterosaur genus after Pteranodon, Rhamphorhynchus, and Pterodactylus, much older genera with many more species than Quetzalcoatlus.

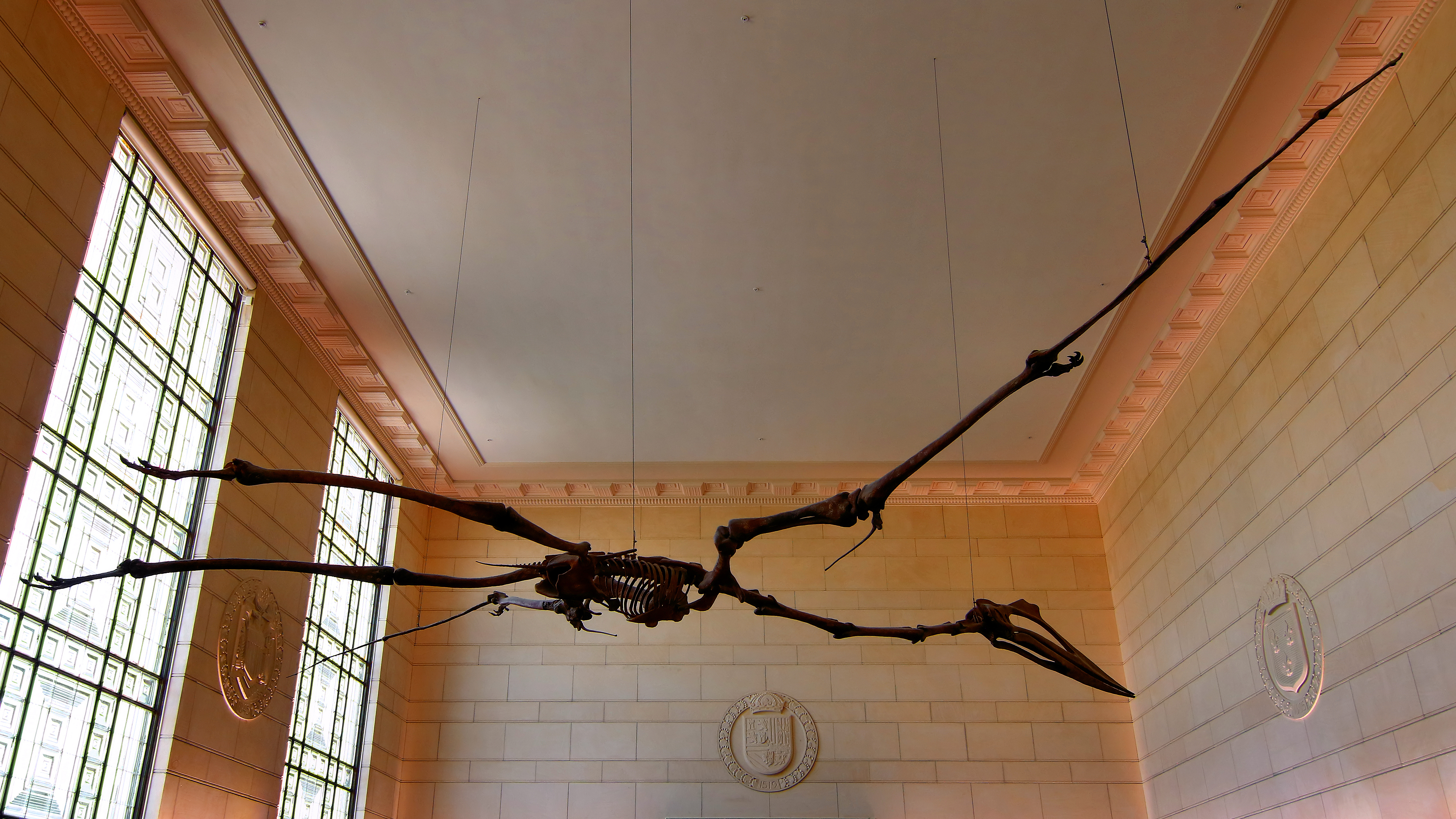
Skeleton reconstruction of Quetzalcoatlus at the Texas Science and Natural History Museum, originally mounted by Langston in the 1980s

Prior to the announcement of the discovery, Langston had returned to Big Bend with a group of fossil preparators in February 1973, primarily aiming to excavate bones of the dinosaur Alamosaurus. One of the preparators, a young man named Bill Amaral who went on to be a respected field worker, had been skipping his lunches to conduct additional explorations of the area. He came across some additional fragments of pterosaur bone on a different portion of the ridge, around 50 kilometers away from the original site. Two more new sites quickly followed nearby, producing many fragments which the crew figured could be fit back together, in addition to a complete carpal and intact wing bone. Langston noted in his field notes that none of these bones suggested animals as large as Lawson's original specimen. Further remains came from Amaral's first site in April 1974, after Lawson's site had been exhausted; a long neck vertebra and a pair of jawbones appeared. Associated structures were initially hoped to represent filamentous pycnofibres, but were later confirmed to be conifer needles. Near the end of the 1974 season, Langston stumbled over a much more complete pterosaur skeleton; it consisted of a wing, multiple vertebrae, a femur and multiple other long bones. They lacked time to fully excavate it, leaving it in the ground until the next field season. This area, where many smaller specimens began to emerge, came to be known as Pterodactyl Ridge. Two of the smaller individuals were reported in the first 1975 paper by Lawson, presumed to belong to the same species, though Langston would begin to question the idea they belonged to Q. northropi by the early 1980s. Excavations continued in 1976, and eight new specimens emerged in 1977; in 1979, despite complications due to losing the field notes from 1977, Langston discovered another new site that would produce an additional ten specimens. Most importantly, a humerus of the smaller animal was finally found, which Langston considered of great importance to understanding Quetzalcoatlus. Several further new localities followed in 1980, but 1981 proved less successful and Langston began to suspect the ridge may have been mostly depleted of pterosaur fossils. There was similarly little success in 1982, and visits during 1983 and 1985 proved to provide the last substantive discoveries of Quetzalcoatlus fossils. Langston returned in 1989, 1991, 1992, and 1996, but only found isolated bones and fragments. Eventually a handful of additional specimens were discovered by former student Thomas Lehman. A visit to Lawson's initial site during 1991 showed that all traces of excavation had by now eroded away. Langston would visit Big Bend for the last time in 1999, having concluded the pterosaur expeditions to focus on the excavation of two skulls of Deinosuchus, another famous fossil of the area.

=== Later research ===
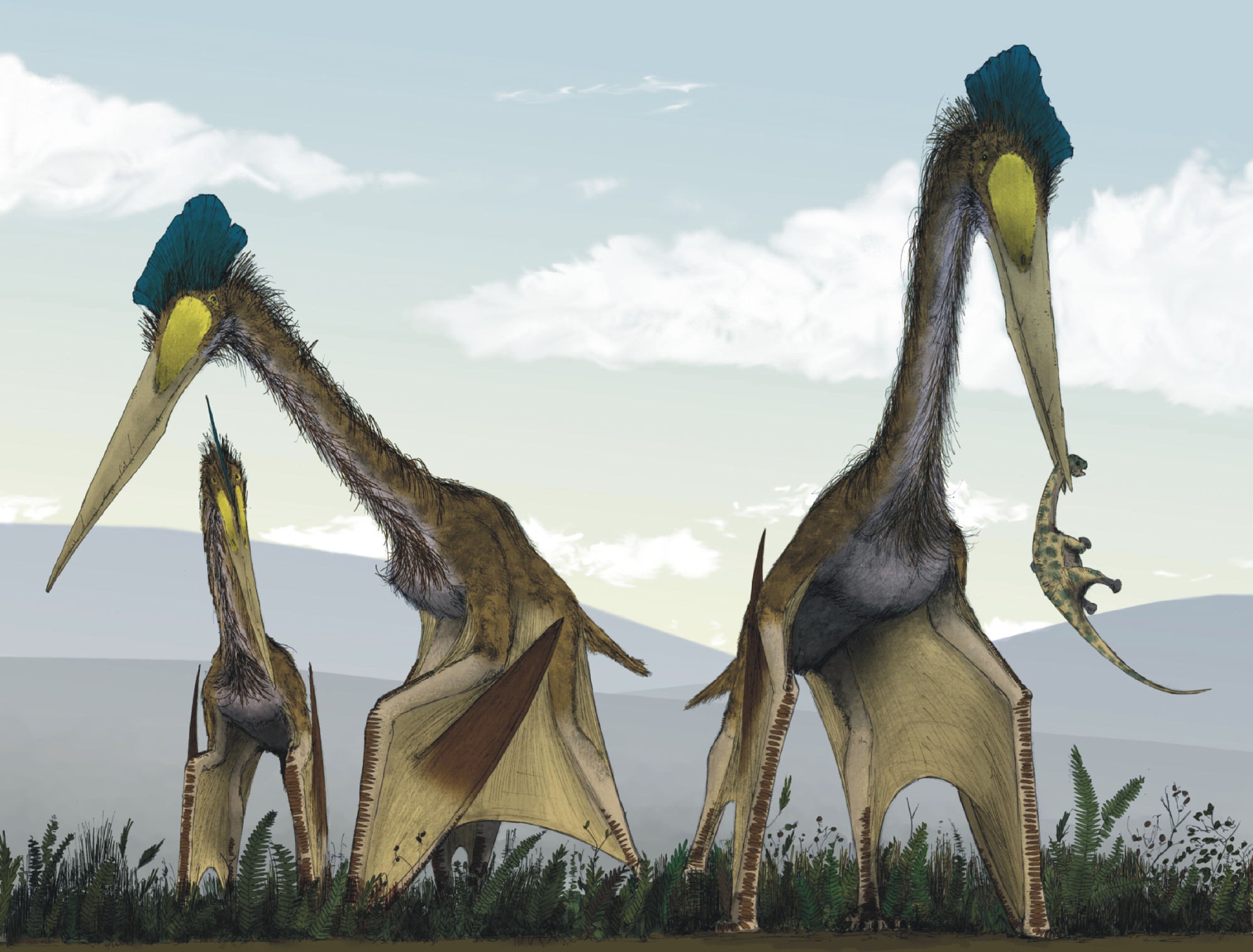
A 2008 Mark Witton depiction of Q. northropi illustrating his then-novel terrestrial stalker hypothesis. Though this theory gained wide acceptance, the anatomy depicted is now considered outdated in some respects.

The expected further description implicated by Lawson never came. For the next 50 years, the material would remain under incomplete study, and few concrete anatomical details were documented within the literature. Much confusion surrounded the smaller individuals from Pterodactyl Ridge. In a 1981 article on pterosaurs, Langston expressed reservations whether they were truly the same species as the immense Q. northropi. In the meantime, Langston focused on the animal's publicity. He worked on a life-sized gliding replica of Quetzalcoatlus northropi with aeronautical engineer Paul MacCready between 1981 and 1985, promoting it in a dedicated IMAX film. The model was created to understand the flight of the animal — prior to Lawson's discovery such a large flier wasn't thought possible, and the subject remained controversial at the time. Furthermore, the model was intended to allow people to experience the animal in a more dynamic manner than a mere static display or film. Around this time he also created a skeletal mount of the genus that was exhibited at the Texas Memorial Museum.

The next scientific effort of note was a 1996 paper by Langston and pterosaur specialist Alexander Kellner. By this time, Langston was confident the smaller animals were a separate species. A full publication establishing such a species was still in preparation at the time, but due to the importance of the skull material for the understanding of azhdarchid anatomy, the skull anatomy was published first. In this publication, the animal was referred to as Quetzalcoatlus sp., a placeholder designation for material not assigned to any particularly valid species. Once again, the planned further publication failed to materialize for decades, and Quetzalcoatlus sp. remained in limbo. A publication on the bioaeromechanics of the genus was also planned by Langston and James Cunningham, but this failed to materialize and the partially completed manuscript later became lost. Ultimately, a comprehensive publication on Quetzalcoatlus sp. would not appear before Langston's death in 2013. By this point he had produced many notes and individual descriptions, but had not begun writing any formal manuscript that could be published.

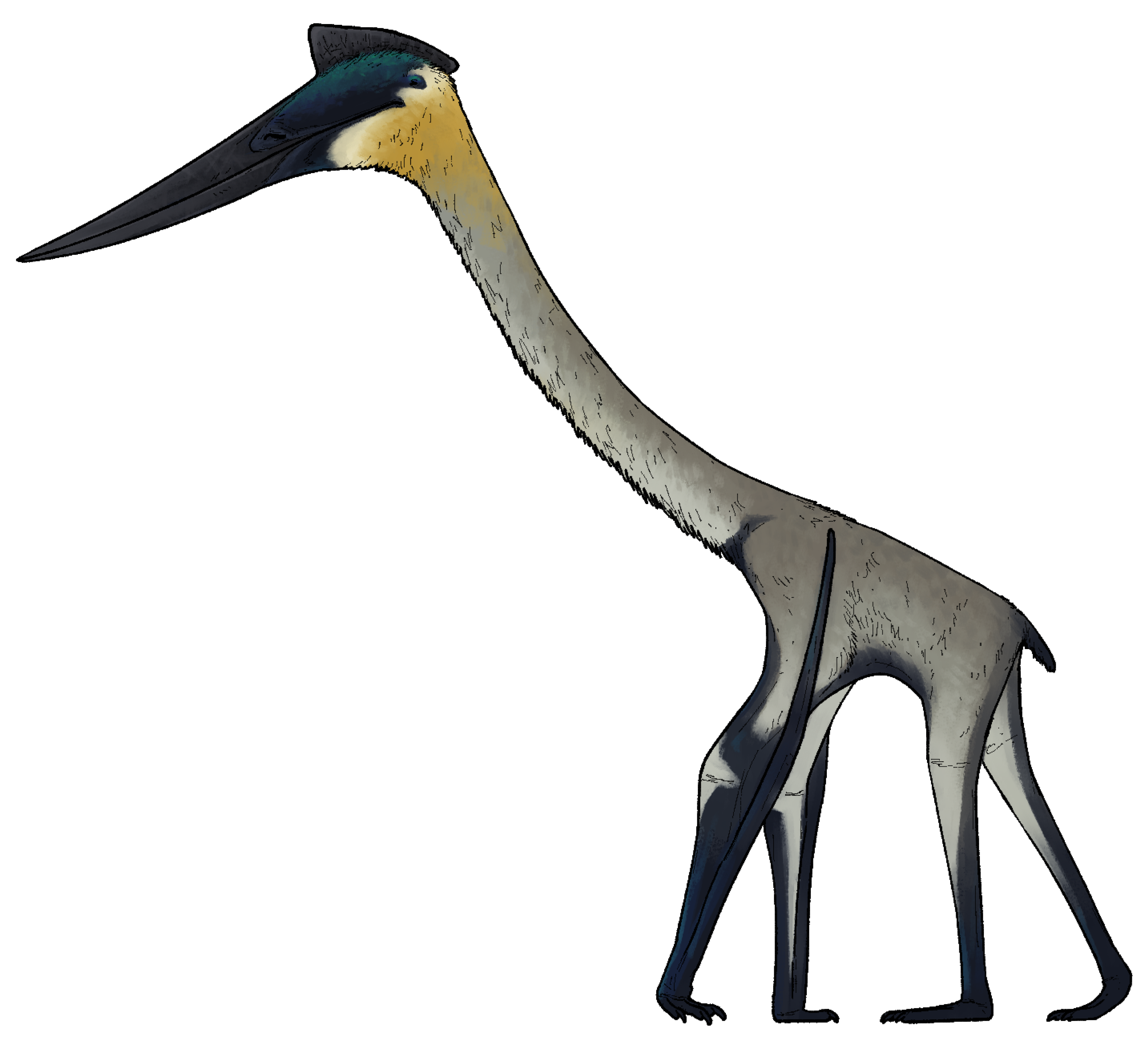
Life reconstruction of Q. lawsoni.

In 2021, a comprehensive description of the genus was finally published, the 19th entry in the Memoir series of special publications by the Society of Vertebrate Paleontology in the Journal of Vertebrate Paleontology. It consisted of five studies published together. Kevin Padian was the primary organizer of the project. A paper on the history of discoveries in Big Bend National Park was authored by Matthew J. Brown, Chris Sagebiel, and Brian Andres. It focused on curating a comprehensive list of specimens belonging to each species to Quetzalcoatlus and the locality information of each within Big Bend. Thomas Lehman contributed a study on the paleonvironment that Quetzalcoatlus would have resided within, based upon work he had begun with Langston as early as 1993. Brian Andres published a study on the morphology and taxonomy of the genus, established species Quetzalcoatlus lawsoni for the smaller animal that had gone for decades without a name. The specific name honoured Lawson, who discovered Quetzalcoatlus. Despite not contributing directly to the written manuscript, the authors of the memoir and Langston's family agreed that he posthumously be considered a co-author due the basis of the work in the decades of research he dedicates to the subject. Also authored by Andres was a phylogenetic study of Quetzacoatlus and its relationships within Pterosauria, with a focus on the persistence of many lineages into the Late Cretaceous contra classical interpretations of Quetzalcoatlus as the last of a dying lineage. Finally, a study on the functional morphology of the genus was authored by Padian, James Cunningham, and John Conway (who contributed scientific illustrations and cover art to the Memoir), with Langston once again considered a posthumous co-author due to his foundational work on the subject. Brown and Padian prefaced the Memoir, and once again emphasized their gratitude to Langston for his decades of work on the animal leading up to the publication.

=== Taxonomy and material ===
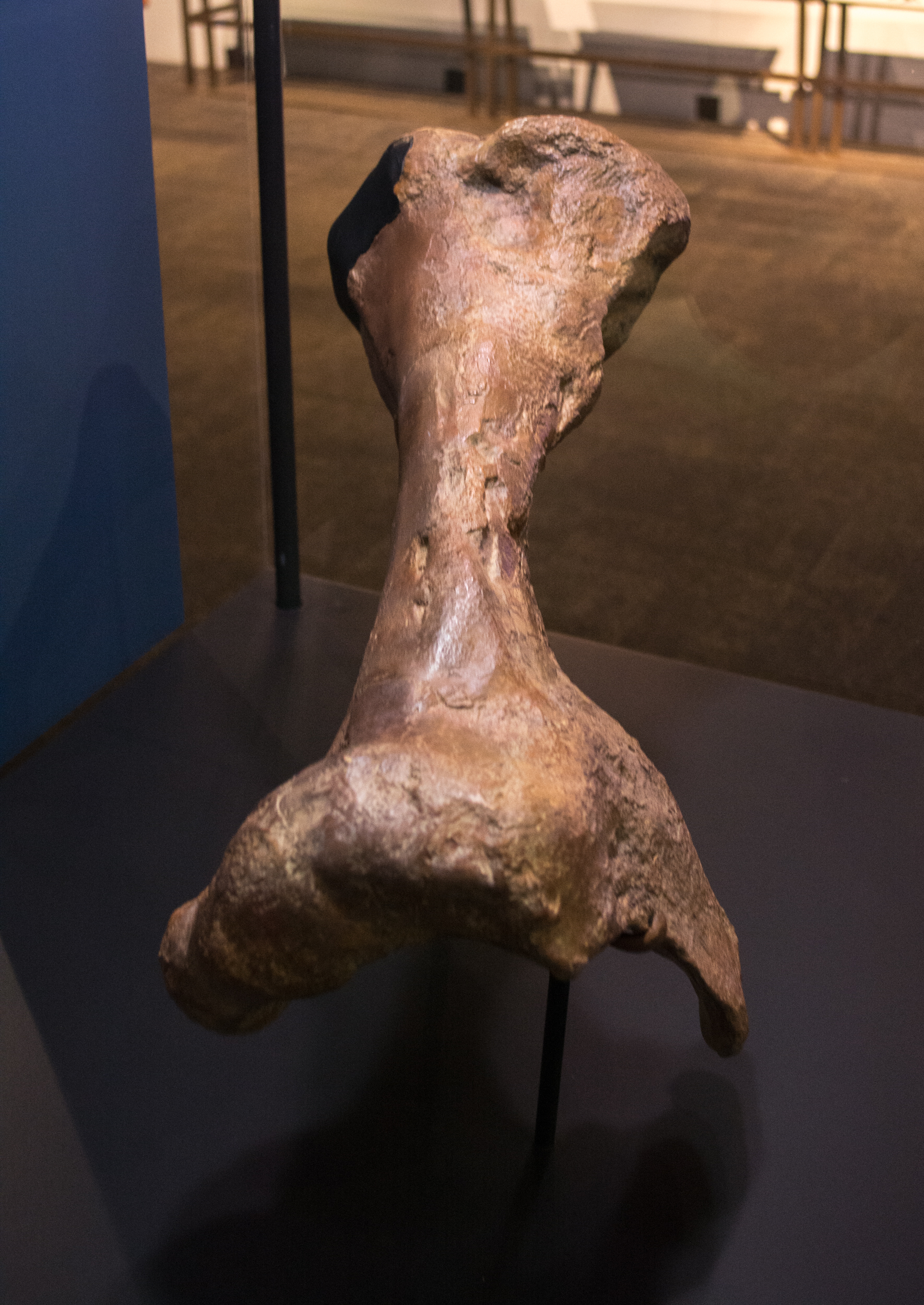
Cast of the humerus from the holotype of Q. northropi

Though the name Quetzalcoatlus was introduced in 1975, the lack of a formal description complicated its validity for several decades. The oldest name for the species is "Pteranodon gigas", from Lawson's 1973 thesis. However, the International Code of Zoological Nomenclature (ICZN) does not consider a thesis to be a formal publication capable of establishing of a taxon, and the name has not been used since. Regarding the genus Quetzalcoatlus and species Q. northropi, the name being established in a separate publication than the anatomical diagnosis also failed ICZN standards. As such, it was argued that the name was a nomen nudum, an intended but invalid scientific name, though some authors argued the second publication referencing the initial description was sufficient. The species received a diagnosis in a 1991 paper by Lev Nessov, but no action was taken to formalize the name. Furthermore, a study by Mark Witton and colleagues in 2010 doubted whether Quetzalcoatlus could be validly diagnosed at all. They noted that the bones preserved in the holotype of Q. northropi were not typically considered to be taxonomically informative between close relatives, and that they appeared extremely similar to those of other giant azhdarchids such as the Romanian azhdarchid Hatzegopteryx. Both of these issues were settled in the 2021 paper, whose rediagnosis affirmed Quetzalcoatlus as distinct. The authors agreed that the original paper did not constitute a valid establishment of the name. The authors noted their publication could serve as the a basis for the name, but did not wish to change the previously presumed authorship of the name. Thus, they submitted an application for the ICZN in 2017 to make an exception to the requirements, and had Lawson's second 1975 paper to be declared as the valid authority of the genus and species. The approval of this ICZN petition on August 30, 2019, conserved and formalized the binomen Quetzalcoatlus northropi as the type species.

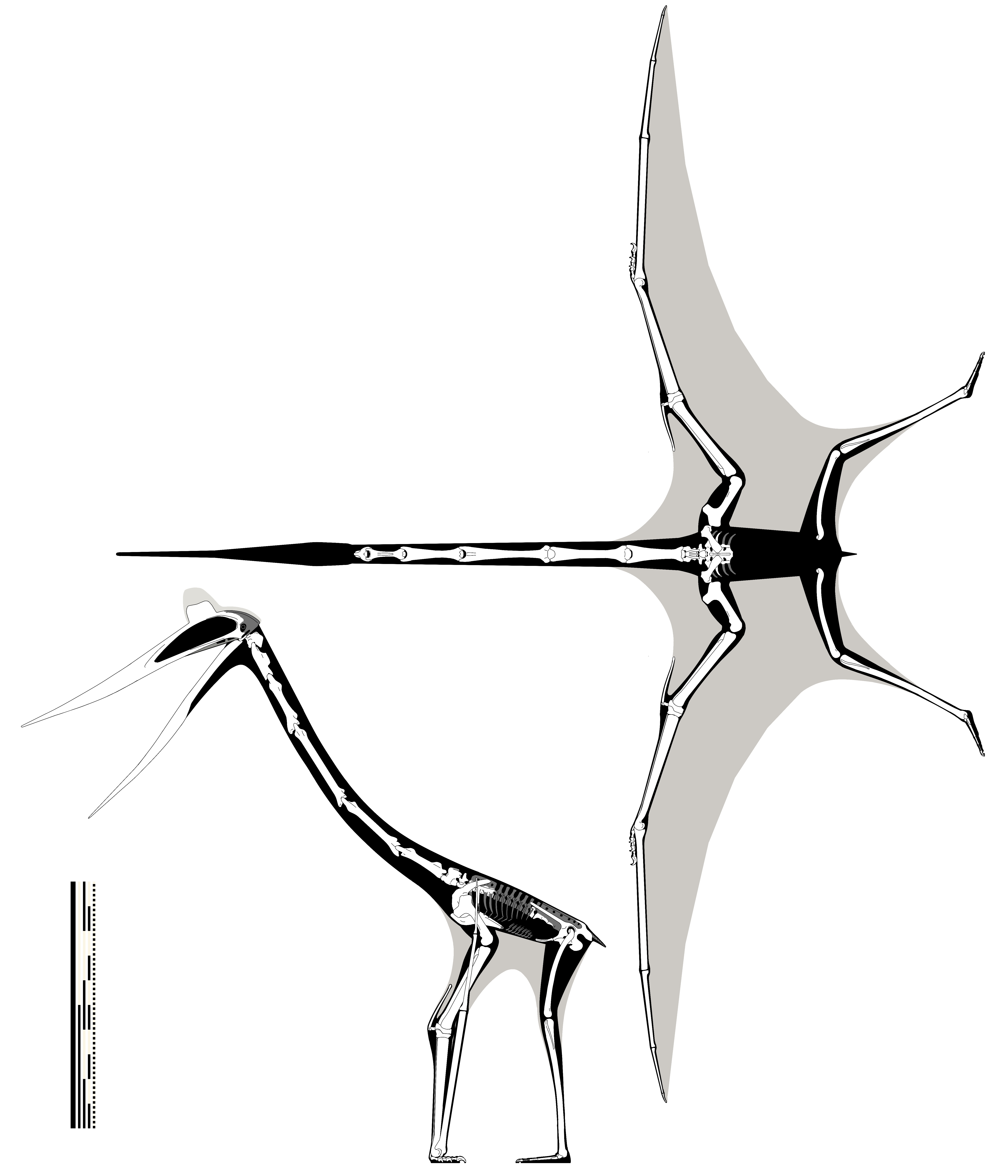
Skeletal reconstruction showing known material of Q. lawsoni

The name-bearing type specimen of Q. northropi is TxVP 41450-3, a partial wing. It includes a humerus, radius, ulna, wrist bones, finger bones, and many elements of the elongate wing finger, in addition to thousands of unidentifiable fragments. It is from the uppermost rocks of the Javelina Formation, making it one of the youngest pterosaur specimens known. Only a single other specimen can confidently be assigned to the same species, a left ulna designated TxVP 44036-1 known from the Black Peaks Formation, around three quarters the size of the type specimen and sharing distinctive anatomy. Four other specimens share a similarly giant size, but cannot be definitively assigned to Q. northropi in lack of overlapping material or distinguishing anatomical regions. TxVP 41047-1 and TxVP 41398-3, are both partial femurs, the former twice the size of that seen in Q. lawsoni. Their anatomy indicates they belonged to the same species, and is distinct from that of Q. lawsoni. Part of a wing finger, TxVP 41398-4, is also of the correct size to belong to Q. northropi but does not preserve the essential anatomy to confirm its identity. This specimen and the smaller femur were the first two specimens Lawson discovered, prior to uncovering the type specimen. Finally, one of the oldest pterosaur specimens in Big Bend is a giant cervical vertebra not matching that of smaller species from the formation. While conventional pterosaur research would assign all of these to Q. northropi, the 2021 redescription preferred to be cautious and merely assigned them to Q. cf. northropi, indicating uncertainty.

The assignment of remains to Q. lawsoni has proved more simplistic; a large quantity of similar remains were found together in nearby sites, 50 km from the Q. northropi locality. In total, 305 different fossil elements from 214 specimens are known, all of which are considered consistent with assignment to the same species. This is the most remains assigned to any singular species of pterosaur. The vast majority of the dozens of specimens are disarticulated individual bones. A few individual animals are, however, represented by associated remains; identification of these individuals was complicated by each bone being catalogued under a separate number, which was revised as part of the 2021 study. The most complete specimen is TxVP 41961-1, which possesses the most complete skull as well as several neck vertebrae, much of both wings, femurs, tibiotarsi, two metatarsals, and one of the toe bones. It was one of the original specimens described by Langston in 1975, and in accordance with Langston's wishes and its completeness was designated as the type specimen. Two less complete specimens, TxVP 42180-14 and TxVP 42161-1, were also preserved in partial articulation, the former mostly composed of limb and neck bones while the latter consists of neck and skull bones. Beyond this, identification of individual specimens is difficult. Two other specimens are more loosely associated, and others may have belonged to a single individual but are too weathered to identify with confidence. In some cases two or three neck vertebrae were found in presumed association, and similar loose associations of one or two limbs bones are seen in several cases. Taken together, nearly the entirely skeleton is represented, with the exception of some of the back of the skull. Eight different specimens preserve various portions of the skull, together allowing for a rather complete picture (excepting a portion of the back of the skull), and similarly the entire mandible is represented when cross-referencing four specimens. All nine neck vertebrae are known, and most torso vertebrae are known through the preservation of the notarium and synsacrum, structures consisting of several fused vertebrae in ornithocheiroid pterosaurs; it is unknown how many unfused vertebrae may have existed between these structures. Every single bone in the arm is known from at least one complete specimen, and the hindlimbs and pelvis are also more or less all present, though the femur and pelvis suffer from poor preservation. In 2025, Quetzalcoatlus was suggested to be polyphyletic with Quetzalcoatlus lawsoni not being sister to Quetzalcoatlus northropi.

=== Other assigned and reclassified material ===
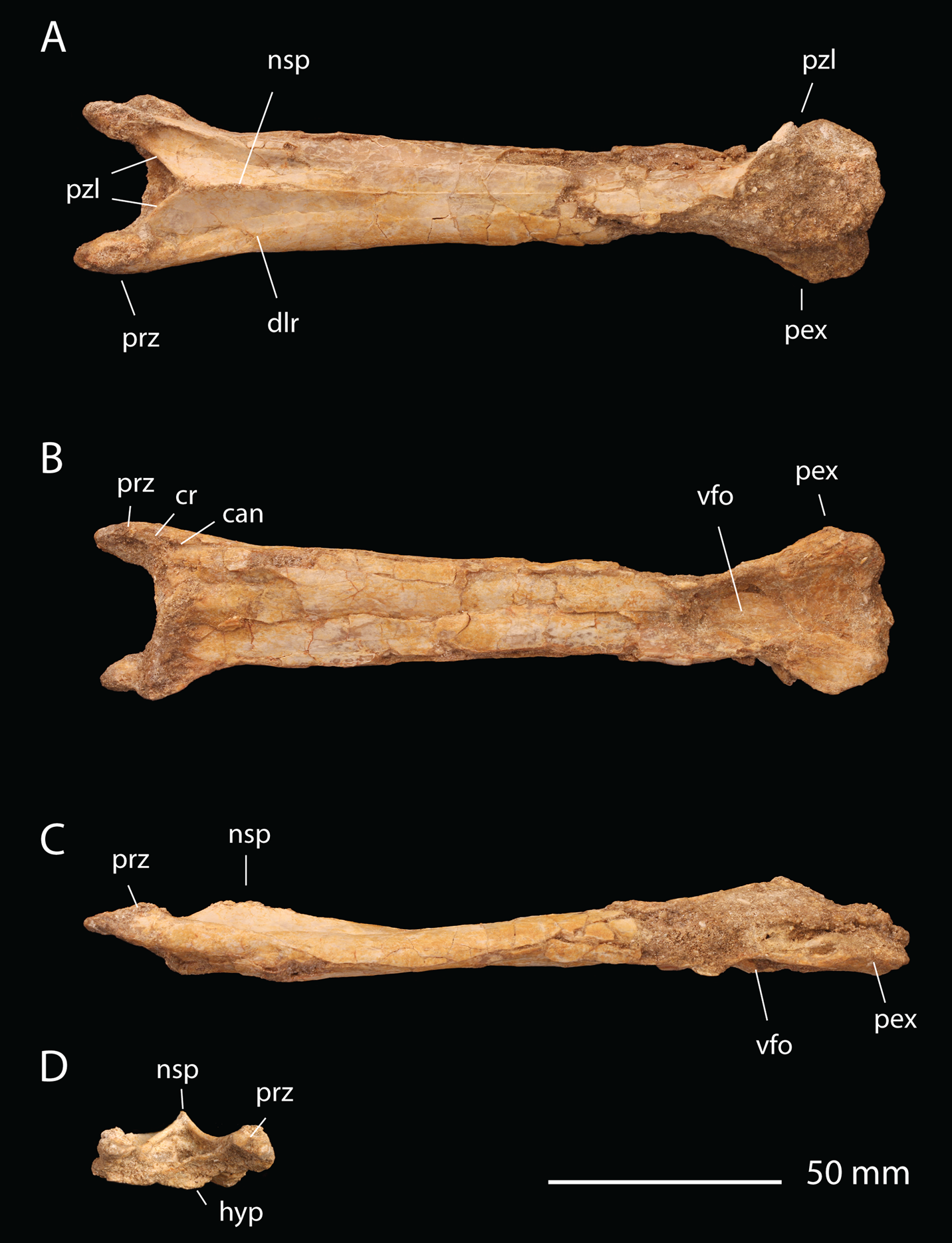
FSAC-OB 14, a vertebra assigned to aff. Quetzalcoatlus

Though most pterosaur remains from Big Bend have been assigned to Quetzalcoatlus, some other material exists. Most prominent amongst these is a specimen discovered around 380 metres (1,250 ft) north of the Pterodactyl Ridge localities, designated as TxVP 42489-2 and compromising a partial skull and jaws as well as five articulated neck vertebrae. It was immediately noted for its distinct shorted-jawed anatomy compared to what had come to be expected from Q. lawsoni specimens. Despite this distinctiveness, it was assigned to as a separate Quetzalcoatlus sp. in a 1991 book by Langston. As early as 1996, however, this was revised with recognition it was certainly a new genus informally known as the "short-faced pterosaur". It was formally named in the 2021 paper alongside Q. lawsoni, as the genus Wellnhopterus. In addition to this specimen, several indeterminate azhdarchid remains and some remains too fragmentary to assign beyond Pterosauria are known from Big Bend. Some of these represent smaller animals than the uniformly sized Q. lawsoni remains. Whether any of these remains represented separate animals from Quetzalcoatlus cannot be determined.

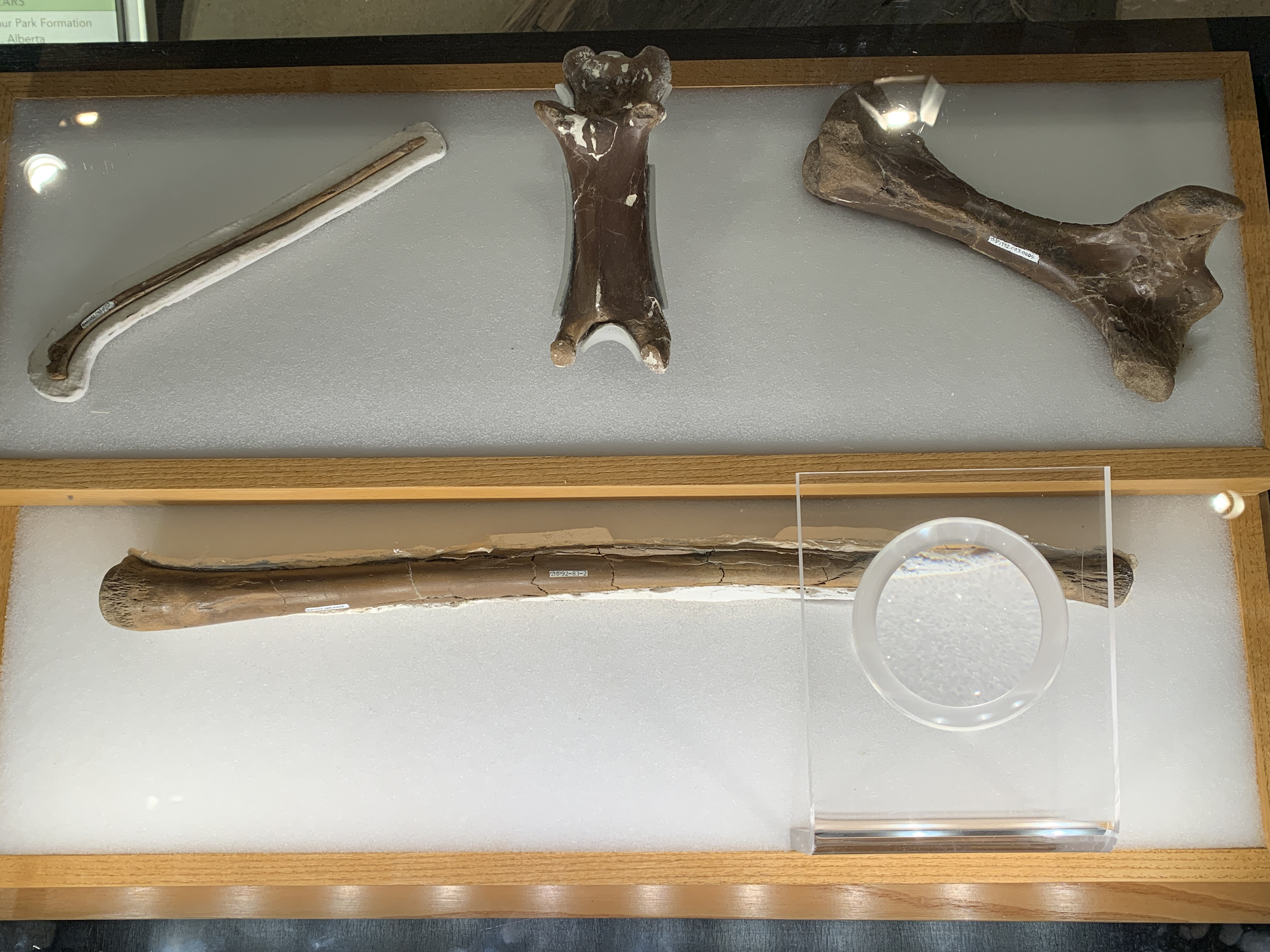
Specimens of Cryodrakon, once considered to represent Quetzalcoatlus

Several specimens from across Late Cretaceous North America were historically assigned to Quetzalcoatlus. In 1982 a femur from the Campanian aged Dinosaur Park Formation of Alberta, Canada was assigned to the genus by Philip J. Currie and Dale Russell. Currie later described further remains from Dinosaur Park in a 2005 book, noting their morphological similarity to Quetzalcoatlus but expressing caution against referral to the genus. In 2019, however, all azhdarchid remains from the formation were revised as distinct from Quetzalcoatlus and named as the new genus Cryodrakon. A humerus from the Two Medicine Formation in Montana was also provisionally assigned to the genus; it was considered an indeterminate azhdarchid or a specimen of Montanazhdarcho by subsequent studies. A neck vertebra from the Hell Creek Formation, also from Montana but dating to the Maastrichtian, was discovered in 2002 and initially assigned in 2006 to Quetzalcoatlus. The 2021 paper merely considered it an azhdarchiform specimen of uncertain affinities, but the 2025 study named it as the holotype of a distinct genus Infernodrakon.

Another neck vertebra, discovered in the similarly aged Lance Formation in Wyoming and first described in 1964, was later assigned to Quetzalcoatlus by Brent H. Breithaupt in 1982; later studies assigned it to Azhdarcho or an indeterminate azhdarchid or azhdarchiform. The 2025 Infernodrakon study found it to be distinguishable from that taxon, but anatomically compatible with Q. lawsoni; when tested in a phylogenetic analysis, they found it to form a polytomy with Q. lawsoni, Q. northropi, and a Moroccan specimen. Therefore, they considered it plausible it belonged to a small Q. lawsoni individual, but decided to merely make a tentative referral to Quetzalcoatlus at the genus level due to the incomplete nature of the specimen. The Moroccan specimen, from the Ouled Abdoun Basin (Maastrichtian), is designated as FSAC-OB 14 and was assigned to aff. Quetzalcoatlus by a 2018 study. This indicates it is considered unlikely to belong to the genus but bears extreme anatomical similarity to it.

== Description ==
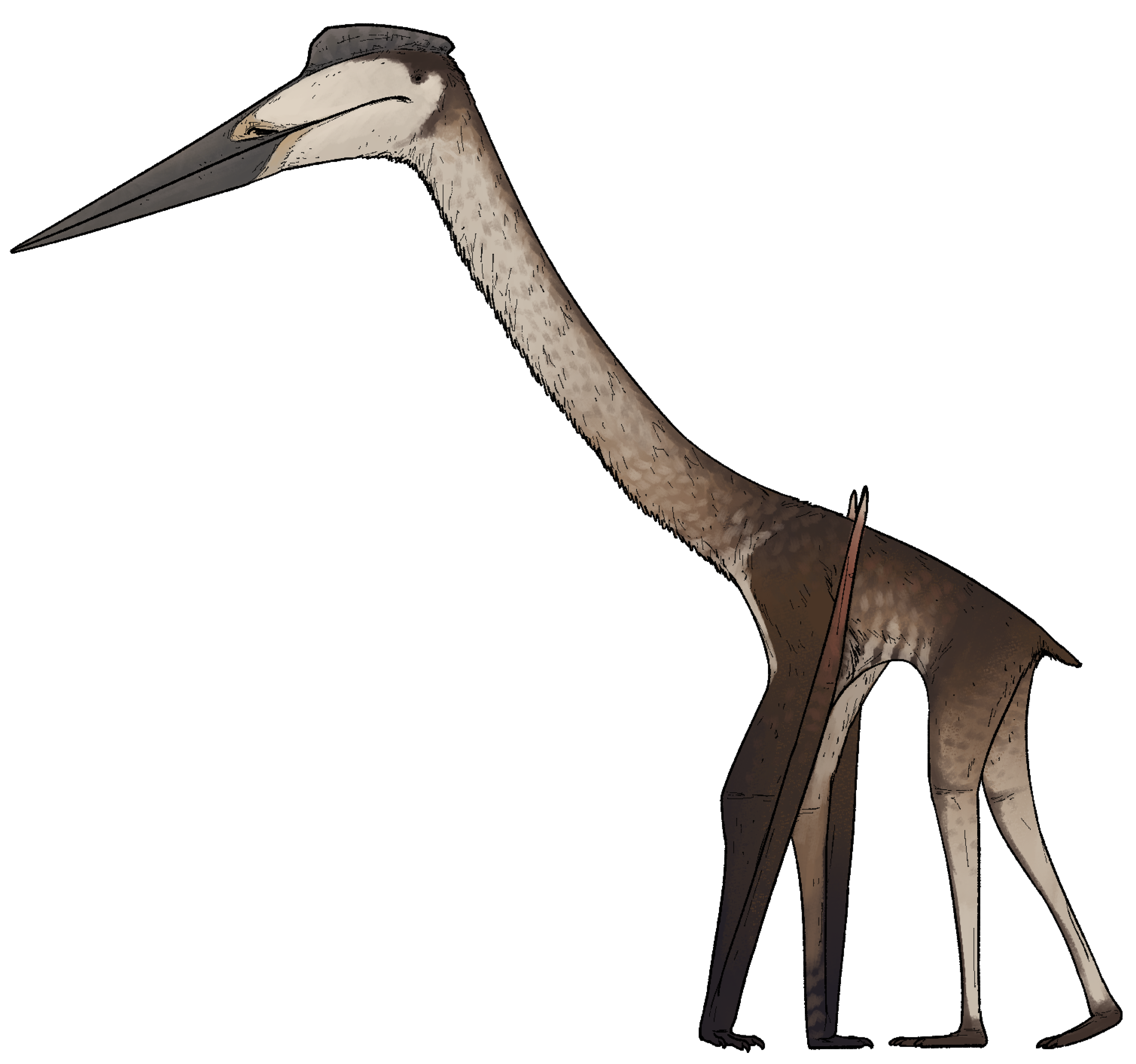
Speculative life reconstruction of Q. northropi

Quetzalcoatlus northropi was among the largest azhdarchids, though was rivalled in size by Arambourgiania and Hatzegopteryx (and possibly Cryodrakon). Azhdarchids were split into two primary categories: short-necked taxa with short, robust beaks (i.e. Hatzegopteryx and Wellnhopterus), and long-necked taxa with longer, slenderer beaks (i.e. Zhejiangopterus). Quetzalcoatlus falls squarely into the latter category. Based on the limb morphology of Q. lawsoni, related azhdarchids such as Zhejiangopterus, and pterosaurs at large, in addition to azhdarchid tracks from South Korea, Quetzalcoatlus was likely quadrupedal. As a pterosaur, Quetzalcoatlus would have been covered in hair-like filaments called pycnofibres, and had extensive wing-membranes, which would have been distended by a long wing-finger. There have been various models of the morphology of pterodactyloid wings, though based on multiple well-preserved pterosaur specimens, it is likely that azhdarchids had broad wings, with a membrane called the brachiopatagium extending from the tip of the wing finger to the outer side of each ankle. The aspect ratio of azhdarchid wings is 8.1, similar to that of storks and birds of prey that engage in static soaring, meaning they are reliant on thermals, updrafts, and other air currents to gain altitude through lift and remain aloft.

=== Size ===
Size comparison of a human to Q. lawsoni (red) and Q. northropi (orange)

Quetzalcoatlus is regarded as one of the largest pterosaurs, though its exact size has been difficult to determine. In 1975, Douglas Lawson compared the wing bones of Q. northropi to equivalent elements in Dsungaripterus and Pteranodon and suggested that it represented an individual with a wingspan of around 15.5 m (51 ft), or, alternatively, 11 m (36 ft) or 21 m (69 ft). Estimates put forward in subsequent years varied dramatically, ranging from 5.2–25.8 m (17–85 ft), owing to differences in methodology. Among the supporters of the initial size estimates was Robert T. Bakker, who, in his 1988 book The Dinosaur Heresies, contended that Quetzalcoatlus may indeed have reached the upper estimates, and that it may have remained flighted by altering its method of flapping. Other estimates contemporary to Bakker's, however, consistently supported a smaller size of 11–12 m (36–39 ft). More recent estimates based on greater knowledge of azhdarchid proportions place its wingspan at 10–11 m (33–36 ft). This would approach the maximum size possible for azhdarchids, estimated at 12–13 m (39–43 ft); while higher wingspans may technically be possible, they would require significant morphological changes, and the animal would struggle to become airborne due to increased strain on its joints and long bones. In one paper from the 2021 Memoir which redescribed Quetzalcoatlus, Q. lawsoni was estimated to have a wingspan of around 4.5 m (15 ft). In 2002, Gregory S. Paul estimated a wingspan of 4.7 m (15 ft) for specimen TxVP 41961-1, while in 2022, he suggested that Q. lawsoni had a somewhat larger wingspan of around 5 m (16 ft) and a body length, measured from the beak tip to the end of the tail, of 3.5 m (11 ft). Large azhdarchids such as Q. northropi have been estimated to have a shoulder height of about 2–3 m (6.6–9.8 ft); the head may have been held at a height of more than 4 m (13 ft), similar to that of an extant giraffe.

Body mass estimates for Quetzalcoatlus have, similarly, been historically variable. Mass estimates for giant azhdarchids are problematic because no existing species shares a similar size or body plan, and in consequence, published results vary widely. Crawford Greenewalt gave mass estimates of between 30–440 kg (66–970 lb) for Q. northropi, with the former figure assuming a small wingspan of 5.2 m (17 ft), and the latter assuming a far larger wingspan of 15.4 m (51 ft). In 2002, Gregory S. Paul noted that the lighter body masses are physically impossible, as the flight muscles alone in Q. northropi would weigh more than a human, and offered a larger estimate of 200–250 kg (440–550 lb). In 2010, Donald M. Henderson recovered the body mass of Quetzalcoatlus at 544 kg (1,199 lb), twice that of other contemporary estimates, citing it as evidence for secondary flightlessness in the genus. However, the vast majority of estimates published since the 2000s have hovered around 200–250 kg (440–550 lb), due largely to a greater understanding of how aberrant the anatomy of azhdarchids was in comparison to other pterosaur clades. In 2021, Kevin Padian and colleagues estimated that Q. northropi would have weighed around 150 kg (330 lb), and that Q. lawsoni would have weighed 20 kg (44 lb); Gregory S. Paul estimated higher body masses of 30–35 kg (66–77 lb) kg for Q. lawsoni specimen TxVP 41691-1 in 2002, and twenty years later, gave a higher estimate of 65 kg (143 lb).

=== Quetzalcoatlus lawsoni ===
Much of what has been said regarding Quetzalcoatlus northropi was informed from the now-separate species Q. lawsoni. Emily Thomas and Skye N. McDavid, in 2025, performed a revision of Azhdarchomorpha which recovered Quetzalcoatlus as polyphyletic, with Q. lawsoni not clading with the type species Q. northropi.

==== Skull ====
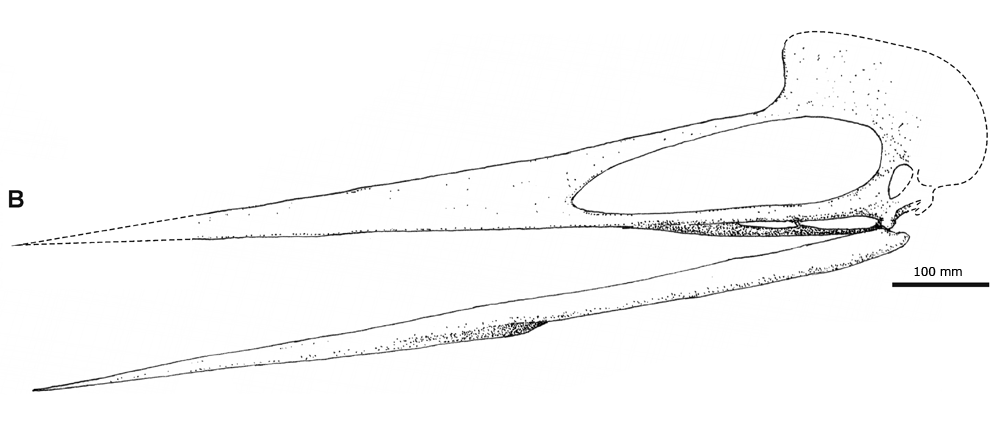
Skull reconstruction of Q. lawsoni

Complete skulls are not known from Quetzalcoatlus. Reconstructions of its skull anatomy therefore typically draw from eight separate Q. lawsoni specimens which preserve skull elements. Based on the length of the mandible (lower jaw), the skull of Q. lawsoni likely measured about 94–96 cm (37–38 in) in length. The distance between the condyloid (articular) processes of the mandible is around 13 cm (5.1 in). The ratio between the length of the skull and the length of the average dorsal (back) vertebra is very high in Q. lawsoni, and is surpassed only by Pteranodon and Tupuxuara.

Like other azhdarchids, Quetzalcoatlus lawsoni had a long, slender, toothless beak, with a gape of around 52 degrees. It was constructed from the premaxilla and maxilla on the upper jaw, and the dentary on the lower jaw. Beak tips are not preserved in any specimen, so it is not clear whether its tip was sharp or had some other morphology, such as a keel. Both the skull and the dentary had a slight sinusoidal curve, which may also be present in Hatzegopteryx. The mandibular symphyses would have widened slightly as the jaw opened, slightly separating the mandibles, which has led to suggestions that some sort of gular pouch was present. While this has led to comparisons with pelicans, the degree of lateral (sideways) motion seen in Q. lawsoni was far lower. At the base of the beak, formed from the premaxilla, was a crest, referred to by some authors as a sagittal crest. A premaxillary crest is also observed in Wellnhopterus, though is smaller and more anterior. The exact form of the crest in Q. lawsoni has yet to be determined, due to the poor preservation of the rear half of all specimen's skulls. Based on what is preserved, two distinct morphotypes have been suggested: one with a square sagittal crest and a tall nasoantorbital fenestra, and one with a more semicircular sagittal crest and a shorter nasoantorbital fenestra. Additionally, one morphotype is larger than the other, and has a proportionally shorter beak. Despite their differences, both share the diagnostic traits of Q. lawsoni, and are considered the same species. The reason for there being two morphotypes is unclear, though it may correlate to individual variation, ontogeny, or sexual dimorphism.

The nasoantorbital fenestra, a massive opening found in many pterosaurs which combined the nasal cavity (which housed the external nostril) and antorbital fenestra, was very large in Q. lawsoni, occupying about a third of the total length of the skull. In the largest specimen, TxVP 41961-1.1, it measured 34.7 cm (13.7 in) in length and 10.45 cm (4.11 in) in height. Q. lawsoni's choanae (internal nostrils) were confluent and anteriorly expanded, meaning that they were essentially fused and expanded towards the front, and formed a fenestra; in TxVP 41961-1.1, they are long enough to occupy around twenty percent of the total length of the skull. The orbit was small and obovate, resembling an inverted egg in shape. It was fairly low on the skull, similar to other azhdarchoids, like tapejarids. Like in other pterosaurs, the orbit was likely positioned in a way that would have allowed Q. lawsoni to see both forwards and directly to the sides, giving it a degree of stereoscopic vision. By turning its head and neck, it could achieve a 180-degree field of vision.

A lacrimal bone is preserved in only one Q. lawsoni specimen, though it is fragmentary. It formed part of the anterodorsal (front upper) margin of the orbit, and the posterodorsal (rear upper) margin of the nasoantorbital fenestra. The jugal bone was triradiate — meaning it branched in three directions — with a maxillary process that was rodlike and formed the lateral margin of the subtemporal fenestra, an opening on the palate. Quetzalcoatlus lawsoni and other azhdarchids had unusually thick jugals among pterosaurs, which may have strengthened the skull in a way that enabled the beak's use in agonistic (fighting) behaviors; while this was most applicable to more robust-skulled genera such as Hatzegopteryx, Darren Naish and Mark Witton suggested in 2013 that this may have been true of most, if not all azhdarchids. In all Q. lawsoni specimens, the palate, consisting of the contact between the maxillae, palatines, and pterygoids, is badly crushed, to the point where it is mostly visible in lateral view. It has been suggested that openings in the palate were for a vomeronasal (Jacobson's) organ, though this may simply be an artefact of the confluence of those bones. The quadrate bone of TxVP 42422-30 has three small, oval-shaped openings on its posterior surface, not seen in other pterosaurs; as these are not present in other specimens, these may be puncture wounds.

==== Skeleton ====
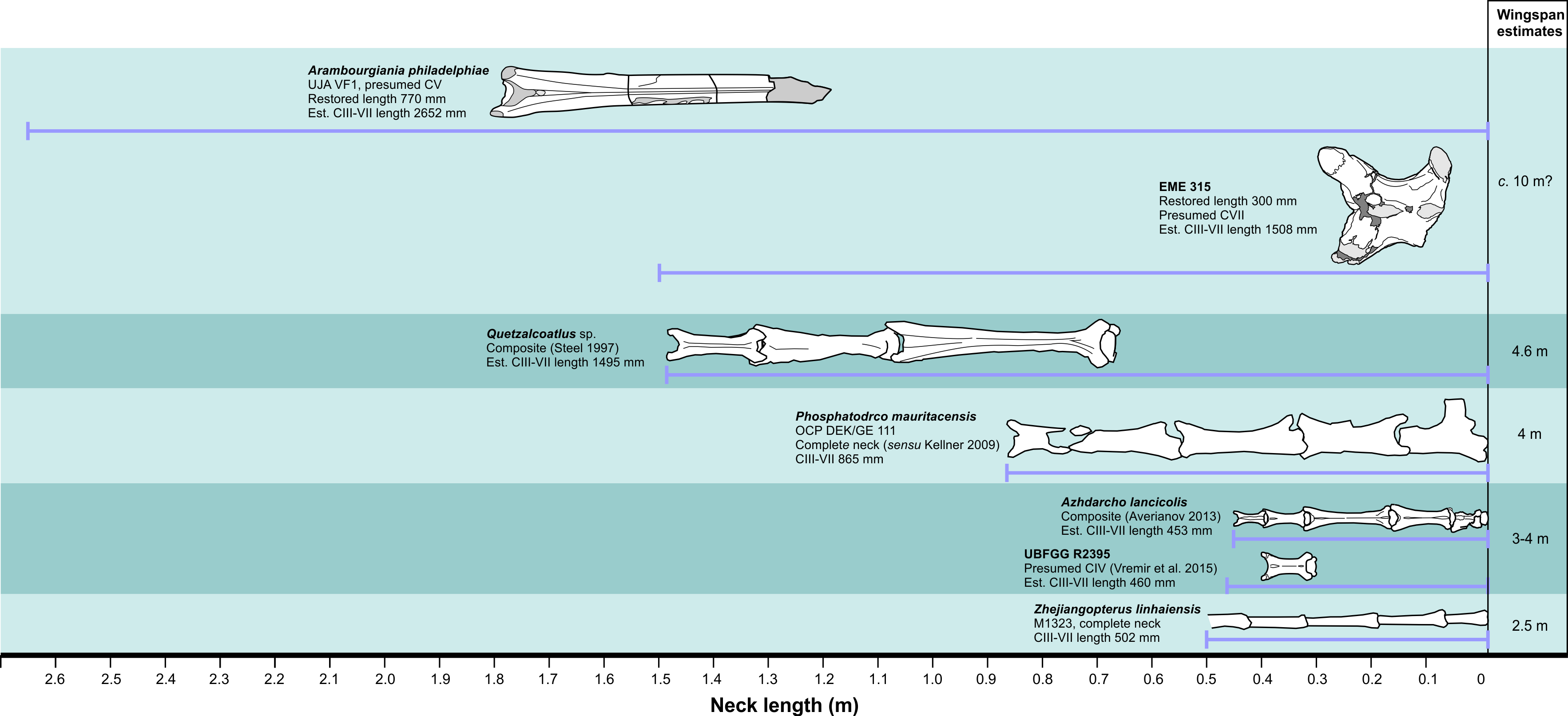
Neck lengths of various azhdarchids. Q. sp. is now Q. lawsoni.

Like other pterosaurs, Quetzalcoatlus had light, hollow bones, supported internally by struts called trabeculae. The neck of Q. lawsoni, measured from the third cervical (neck) vertebra to the seventh, has been estimated at 149.5 cm (58.9 in). It consisted of nine elongated vertebrae, which were procoelous, meaning that they were concave at the front. All of them were compressed dorsoventrally (top to bottom), and were better suited for dorsoventral motion than lateral (side-to-side) motion. However, the lateral range of motion was still extensive, and the neck and head could swing left and right in an arc of about 180 degrees. Like in other azhdarchoids, the cervical vertebrae were low, with neural arches that were essentially inside the centrum. In most azhdarchids, the neural spine of the seventh cervical vertebra was fairly long. This was not the case in Q. lawsoni, where the neural spine was shorter. Internally, the cervical vertebrae were supported by trabeculae that increased their buckling load substantially (about 90%). This may have been an adaptation for counteracting shear forces exerted on the neck while in flight, though may have also enabled agonistic neck-bashing behaviors like those seen in giraffes. While airborne, the neck of Q. northropi would have likely assumed a slight S-shaped curve, similar to swans.

Similar to other azhdarchids, the torso of Quetzalcoatlus lawsoni was proportionally small, about half as long again as the humerus. The vertebrae at the base of the neck and the pectoral (shoulder) girdle are poorly known. The first four dorsal (back) vertebrae are fused into a notarium, like in some other pterosaurs and birds, and particularly ornithocheiroids. The notarium supported the shoulder girdle during flight, and prevented the ribcage from being compressed by the wing muscles during each stroke. The vertebral count of the notarium is unlike Zhejiangopterus, which had six notarial vertebrae, but like Azhdarcho. Most other dorsal vertebrae are absent, except for three which had been integrated into the sacrum. Around seven dorsal vertebrae were free of the notarium and sacrum. Four true sacral vertebrae are preserved, though there were likely seven in all. No caudal (tail) vertebrae are preserved in any Quetzalcoatlus specimens.

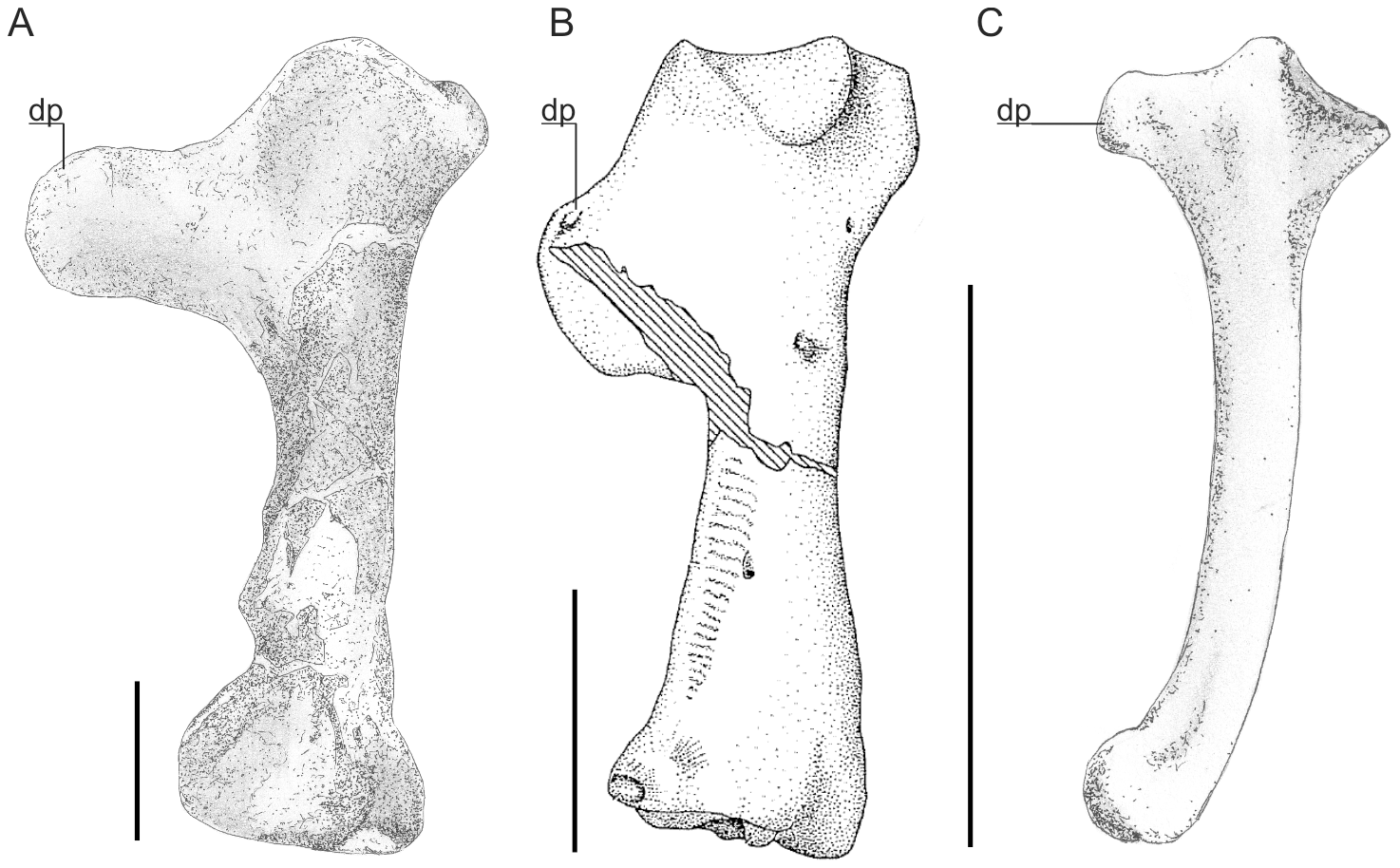
Holotype humerus of Q. northropi (A), alongside the humeri of Pteranodon (B) and Pterodactylus (C). The first two scale bars are 100 mm, while the third is 10 mm.

Quetzalcoatlus lawsoni's scapulocoracoid — a fusion of the scapula and coracoid bones — was U-shaped and broad. Throughout azhdarchid evolution, the scapula had been reducing in length, and this reached its pinnacle in Q. lawsoni, where the scapula was only slightly longer than the coracoid. The sternum, like that of other pterosaurs, was broad. It had a transverse ridge on its posterior (rear) portion, also observed in Pteranodon, albeit it was further forward in that genus. Like other pterosaurs, the bone walls of the sternum were very thin, and in the case of Q. lawsoni, they were as little as 1.5 mm (0.059 in) thick. Quetzalcoatlus lawsoni (presumably Quetzalcoatlus northropi) and other azhdarchids have forelimb and hind limb proportions more similar to modern running ungulate mammals than to members of other pterosaur clades, implying that they were uniquely suited to a terrestrial lifestyle. The humerus (upper arm bone) was short and robust, with considerable mobility. The two species had different humerus morphology, with Q. lawsoni's humerus having a proportionally shorter deltopectoral crest, and Q. northropi's being shaped more like a twisted hourglass. The ulna of Q. northropi was relatively shorter than that of Q. lawsoni, measuring 1.36 times the length of the humerus, as opposed to 1.52 times the length of the humerus in Q. lawsoni and other azhdarchiforms. Like all pterosaurs, Quetzalcoatlus had a specialized carpal (wrist) bone, the pteroid, which attached to the sesamoid bone of the wrist. It faced inwards, pointing towards the deltopectoral crest, and supported the propatagium. Specialized muscles allowed it to move slightly. The first digit was the smallest, and the third was almost the biggest digit that routinely contacted the ground. As with all pterosaurs, the wing finger was considerably longer than the others. It did not contact the ground, as evidenced by footprints. While on land, it may have been held between the elbow and the torso. The wings were short and broad, and forelimb musculature was extensive. Flapping power came from several muscle groups on the torso, forearm and manus (hand).

Typically for a pterosaur, the pelvis of Q. lawsoni consists of an ilium, pubis and ischium that had fused into a single unit, articulating anteroventrally (towards the front, at the bottom) with the prepubis, a small bone that sat before the pubis and likely helped support the abdominal cavity during respiration. The pelvis of one Q. lawsoni specimen (TxVP 41954-57) is large compared to that of other specimens, with deep posterior emargination and no preserved symphisis. This suggests that Q. lawsoni exhibited sexual dimorphism, similar to that suggested for other monofenestratans (i.e. Darwinopterus, Anhanguera and Nyctosaurus). The femur (thigh bone) was significantly more gracile than the humerus, though was still among the most robust bones in Q. lawsoni's skeleton. Based on Zhejiangopterus, the humerus was around eighty percent of the length of the tibiotarsus. Azhdarchids overall had fairly narrow feet, no longer than 30% of the length of the tibia, which may have borne fleshy pads similar to those of tapejarids. They were plantigrade, meaning that they walked with the sole of the foot flat on the ground. Q. lawsoni possessed well-developed pedal (foot) unguals, which supported moderately curved claws, shorter and slightly straighter than those of tapejarids.

== Classification ==
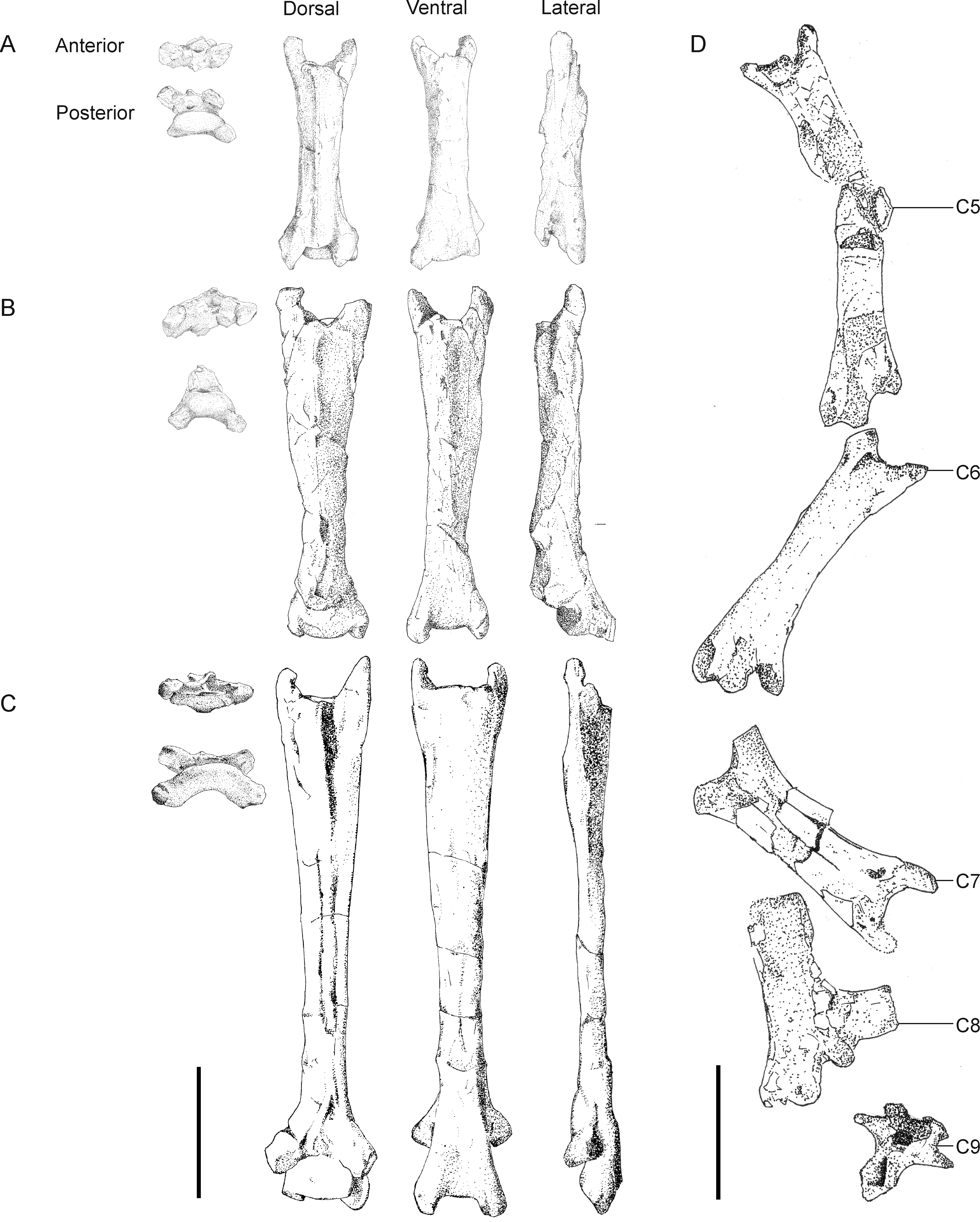
A comparison of Q. lawsoni cervical vertebrae (on the left) with the Phosphatodraco holotype (on the right)

When describing Quetzalcoatlus in 1975, Douglas Lawson and Crawford Greenewalt opted not to assign it to a clade more specific than Pterodactyloidea, though comparisons with Arambourgiania (then Titanopteryx) from Jordan had been drawn earlier that year. In 1984, Lev Alexandrovich Nessov erected the subfamily Azhdarchinae within Pteranodontidae to contain Azhdarcho, Quetzalcoatlus, and Titanopteryx. Unaware of that subfamily, in the same year, Kevin Padian erected the family Titanopterygiidae to accommodate Quetzalcoatlus and Titanopteryx, defining it based on the length and general morphology of the cervical vertebrae. Two years later, in 1986, noting commonalities not only in contained genera but in diagnostic features, he rendered Titanopterygiidae a junior synonym of Azhdarchinae, elevating the latter to family level and forming the family Azhdarchidae. In 2003, the clade Azhdarchoidea was defined by David Unwin. Azhdarchids were determined to form a clade, Neoazhdarchia, with Tapejaridae. Montanazhdarcho from North America and Zhejiangopterus from China were incorporated into Azhdarchidae. In the supplementary material for their 2014 paper describing Kryptodrakon progenitor, Andres, James Clark and Xing Xu named a new subfamily, Quetzalcoatlinae, of which Quetzalcoatlus is the type genus.

The relationship between Quetzalcoatlus and other giant azhdarchids, like Arambourgiania and Hatzegopteryx, is not certain. In 2021, Brian Andres recovered them as sister taxa, with Arambourgiania being the sister taxon of Quetzalcoatlus and Hatzegopteryx being slightly more basal. However, Rubi V. Pêgas and colleagues, in 2022, instead recovered Quetzalcoatlus as part of one of two quetzalcoatline branches, alongside Cryodrakon; the other giant azhdarchid genera were recovered on the other branch. A similar dichotomy was recovered by Leonardo Ortiz David and colleagues that same year, with the inclusion of Thanatosdrakon as Quetzalcoatlus' sister genus.

The first of the below cladograms shows the results recovered by Andres in 2021, and the second shows the results recovered by Ortiz David and colleagues in 2022.

Topology 1: Andres (2021).

- Azhdarchidae
  - Azhdarchinae
    - Azhdarcho lancicollis
    - - Albadraco tharmisensis
      - - Aerotitan sudamericanus
        - Mistralazhdarcho maggii
  - Quetzalcoatlinae
    - - Aralazhdarcho bostobensis
      - Phosphatodraco mauritanicus
    - - Eurazhdarcho langendorfensis
      - - Zhejiangopterus linhaiensis
        - - Wellnhopterus brevirostris
          - Cryodrakon boreas
          - - Hatzegopteryx thambema
            - - Arambourgiania philadelphiae
              - - Quetzalcoatlus lawsoni (=Q. lawsoni)
                - Quetzalcoatlus northropi

Topology 2: Ortiz David and colleagues (2022).

- Azhdarchidae
  - - Eurazhdarcho langendorfensis
    - - Phosphatodraco mauritanicus
      - Aralazhdarcho bostobensis
  - - Zhejiangopterus linhaiensis
    - - Azhdarcho lancicollis
      - Quetzalcoatlinae
        - - - Arambourgiania philadelphiae
            - - Aerotitan sudamericanus
              - Mistralazhdarcho maggii
          - - - Hatzegopteryx thambema
              - Albadraco tharmisensis
        - - Cryodrakon boreas
          - - Thanatosdrakon amaru
            - - Quetzalcoatlus lawsoni (=Q. lawsoni)
              - - aff. Quetzalcoatlus (FSAC-OB 14)
                - Quetzalcoatlus northropi

A 2025 analysis by Emily R. Thomas and Skye N. McDavid performed a revision of Azhdarchomorpha which recovered Quetzalcoatlus as polyphyletic, with the type species Q. northropi being sister to Thanatosdrakon while Q. lawsoni claded in a polytomy with the 'Tous pterosaur' and other unnamed specimens that was recovered as sister to Thanatosdrakon and Q. northropi.

A reproduction of their results is below:

- Serpennata
  - MPCA PV 2003
  - - Infernodrakon hastacollis
    - - MPPM 2000.23.1
      - Arambourgiania philadelphiae
  - - - Thanatosdrakon amaru
      - Quetzalcoatlus northropi
    - - 'Tous pterosaur'
      - ME1 04
      - UCMP 114286
      - FSAC-OB 14
      - Quetzalcoatlus lawsoni

== Paleobiology ==
=== Terrestrial locomotion ===
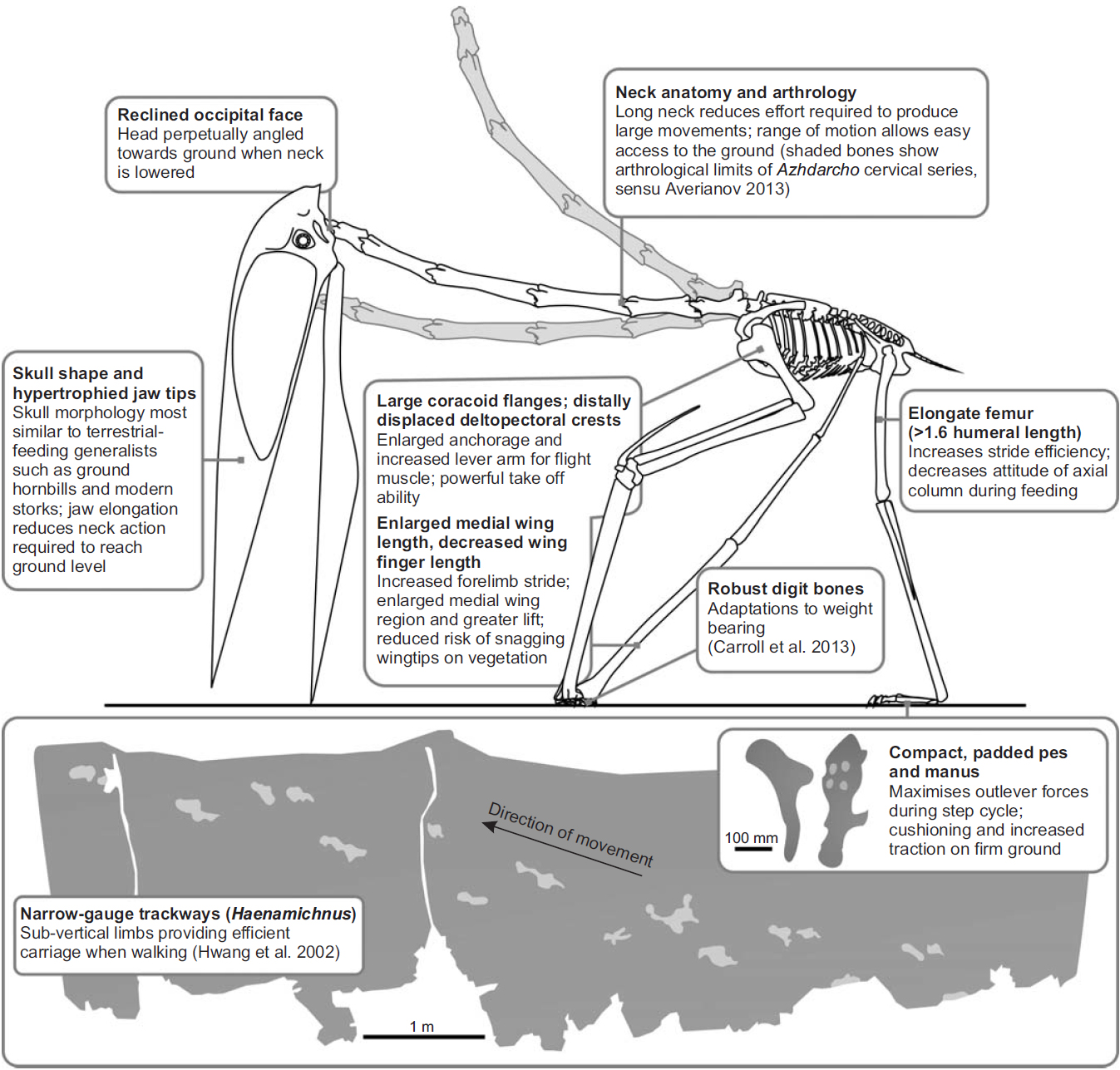
Diagram showing the terrestrial adaptations of azhdarchids. At the bottom is the presumed azhdarchid trackway Haenamichnus.

Azhdarchids are the only group of pterosaurs to which trackways have been confidently assigned. Haenamichnus, from South Korea, matches azhdarchids in foot shape, age, and size; it is estimated that most trackmakers had a wingspan of about 5–6 m (16–20 ft), though some may have had a greater wingspan of about 10 m (33 ft). One long Haenamichnus trackway shows that azhdarchids walked with their limbs held directly underneath their body, which, along with the morphology of their feet, indicates they were more proficient on the ground than other pterosaurs. Terrestrial locomotion in azhdarchids like Quetzalcoatlus likely involved a pacing gait, wherein the limbs on one side of the body would move at roughly the same time, followed by those of the opposite side. For example, the forelimb on one side of the body would lift off the ground and move forward first, to avoid colliding with the hind foot, and the hind limb would follow suit. The forefoot would be planted in the ground just before the hind foot. Once the stride completed, the same process would repeat on the opposite side of the body.

=== Flight ===
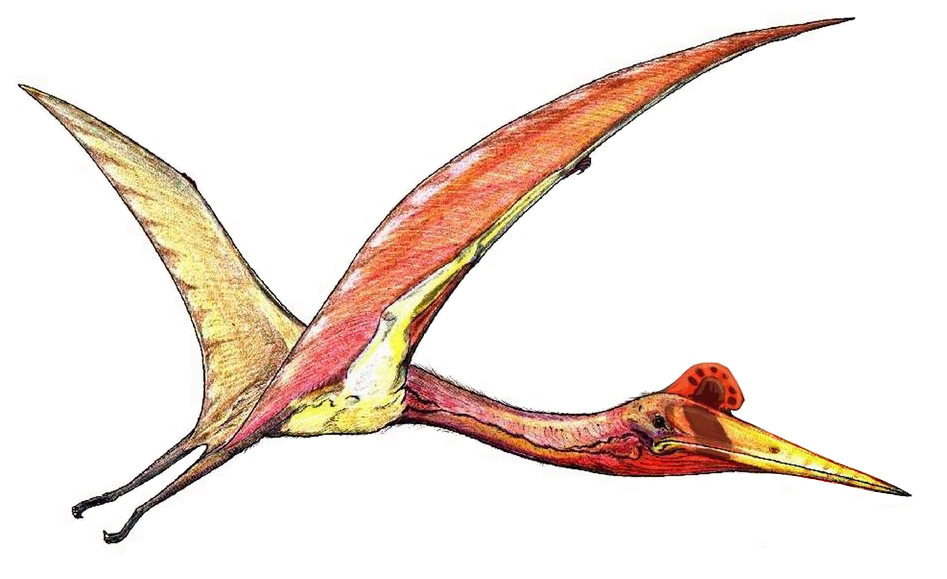
Restoration of a Quetzalcoatlus in flight

The nature of flight in Quetzalcoatlus and other giant azhdarchids was poorly understood until serious biomechanical studies were conducted in the 21st century. A 1984 experiment by Paul MacCready used practical aerodynamics to test the flight of Quetzalcoatlus. MacCready constructed a model flying machine or, ornithopter, with a simple computer functioning as an autopilot. The model successfully flew with a combination of soaring and wing flapping. The model was based on a then-current weight estimate of around 80 kg (180 lb), far lower than more modern estimates of over 200 kg (440 lb). The method of flight in these pterosaurs depends largely on their weight, which has been controversial, and widely differing masses have been favored by different scientists. Some researchers have suggested that these animals employed slow, soaring flight, while others have concluded that their flight was fast and dynamic. In 2010, Donald Henderson argued that the mass of Q. northropi had been underestimated, even the highest estimates, and that it was too massive to have achieved powered flight. He estimated in his 2010 paper that its mass may have been up to 540 kg (1,190 lb), and argued that it may have been flightless.

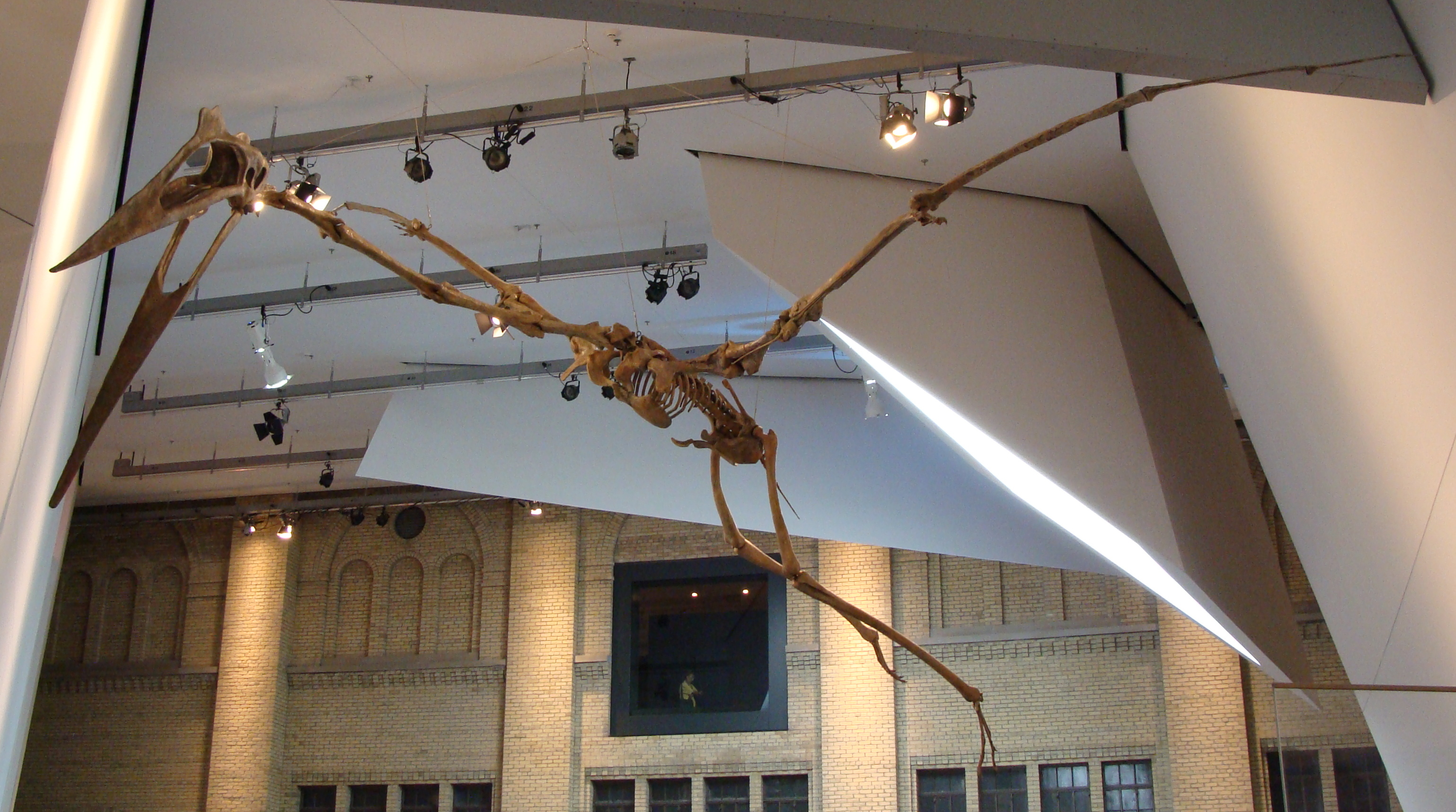
Quetzalcoatlus skeleton mounted in a flying pose at the Royal Ontario Museum.

Other flight capability estimates have disagreed with Henderson's research, suggesting instead an animal superbly adapted to long-range, extended flight. In 2010, Mike Habib, a professor of biomechanics at Chatham University, and Mark Witton, a British paleontologist, undertook further investigation into the claims of flightlessness in large pterosaurs. After factoring wingspan, body weight, and aerodynamics, computer modeling led the two researchers to conclude that Q. northropi was capable of flight up to 130 km/h (80 mph) for 7 to 10 days at altitudes of 4,600 m (15,000 ft). Habib further suggested a maximum flight range of 13,000–19,000 km (8,000–12,000 mi) for Q. northropi. Henderson's work was also further criticized by Witton and Habib in another study, which pointed out that, although Henderson used excellent mass estimations, they were based on outdated pterosaur models, which caused his mass estimations to be more than double what Habib used in his estimations and that anatomical study of Q. northropi and other big pterosaur forelimbs showed a higher degree of robustness than would be expected if they were purely terrestrial. This study proposed that large pterosaurs most likely utilized a short burst of powered flight to then transition to thermal soaring. However, a study from 2022 suggests that they would only have flown occasionally and for short distances, like the Kori bustard (the world's heaviest bird that actively flies) and that they were not able to soar at all. Studies of Q. northropi and Q. lawsoni published in 2021 by Kevin Padian and colleagues instead suggested that Quetzalcoatlus was a very powerful flier. While Padian himself also suggested that the legs and feet were likely tucked under the body during flight as in modern birds, co-authors John Conway and James Cunningham endorsed a system more in line with conventional models of pterosaur flight, wherein the hind limbs were splayed out while the animal was airborne.

=== Launching ===
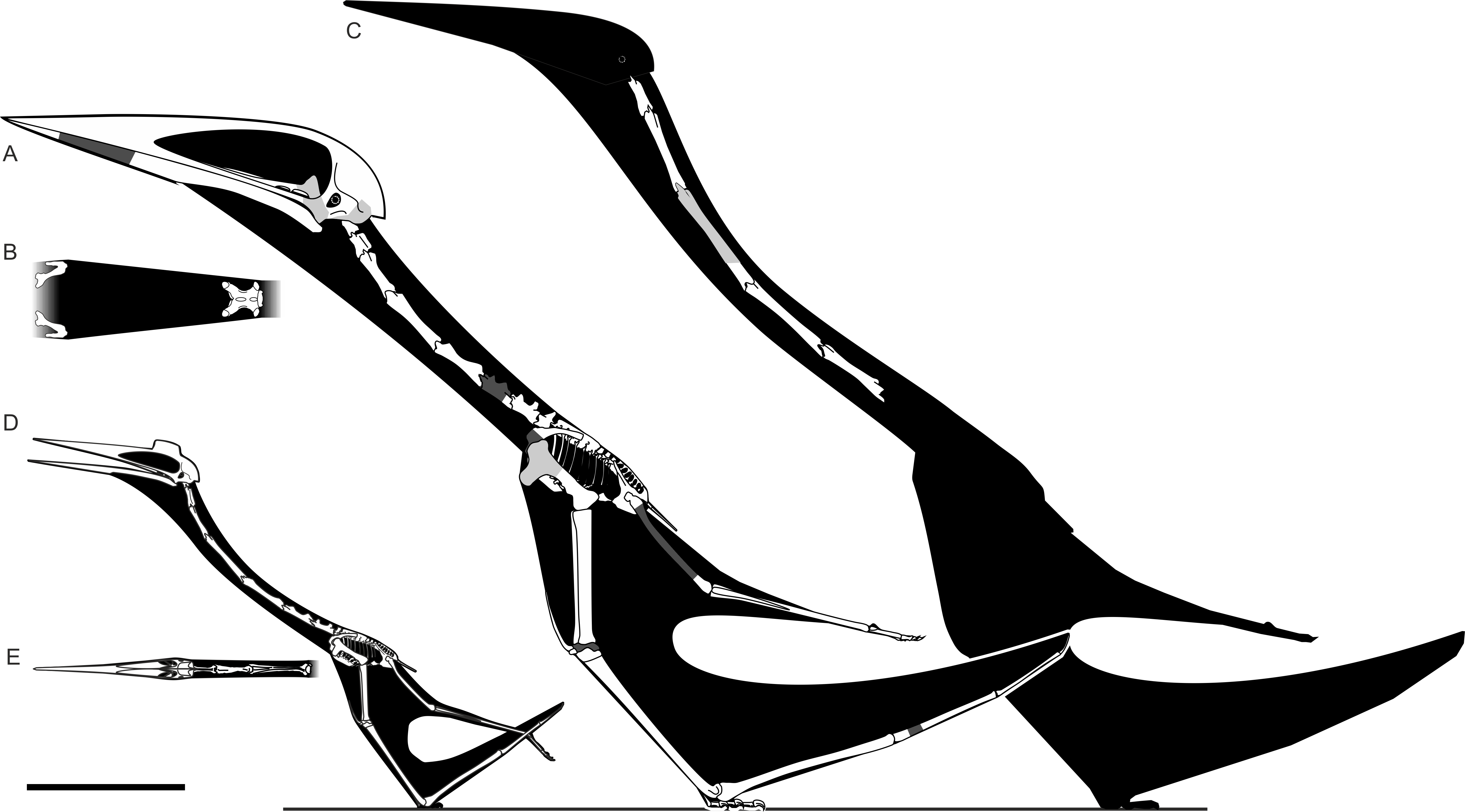
Skeletal reconstructions of three azhdarchids launching quadrupedally: Q. lawsoni on the left, Hatzegopteryx thambema in the middle, and Arambourgiania philadelphiae on the right.

Early interpretations of Quetzalcoatlus launching relied on bipedal models. In 2004, Sankar Chatterjee and R.J. Templin used a 70 kg (150 lb) model and utilized a running launch cycle powered by the hind limbs, in which Q. northropi was only barely able to take off. In 2008, Michael Habib suggested that the only feasible takeoff method for a 200–250 kg (440–550 lb) Quetzalcoatlus was one that was mainly powered by the forelimbs. In 2010, Mark Witton and Habib noted that the femur of Quetzalcoatlus was only a third as strong as what would be expected from a bird of equal size, whereas the humerus is considerably stronger, and affirmed that an azhdarchid the size of Quetzalcoatlus would have great difficulty taking off bipedally. Thus, they considered a quadrupedal launching method, with the forelimbs applying most of the necessary force, a likelier method of takeoff. However, in 2021, Kevin Padian and colleagues attempted to resurrect the bipedal launch model, using a comparatively lightweight estimate of 150 kg (330 lb). They suggested that Quetzalcoatlus' hind limbs were more powerful than previously suggested, and that they were strong enough to launch its body as high as 8 ft (2.4 m) off the ground without the aid of the forelimbs. A large breastbone would support the necessary muscles to create a flight stroke, allowing Quetzalcoatlus to gain enough clearance to begin the downstrokes needed for takeoff. In a blog post written in response to the Padian and colleagues study, Mark Witton wrote that little of Quetzalcoatlus' morphology indicated that a bipedal launch mechanism was employed, and that quadrupedal launching, even in the smaller Q. lawsoni, remained the likeliest model.

== Paleoecology ==
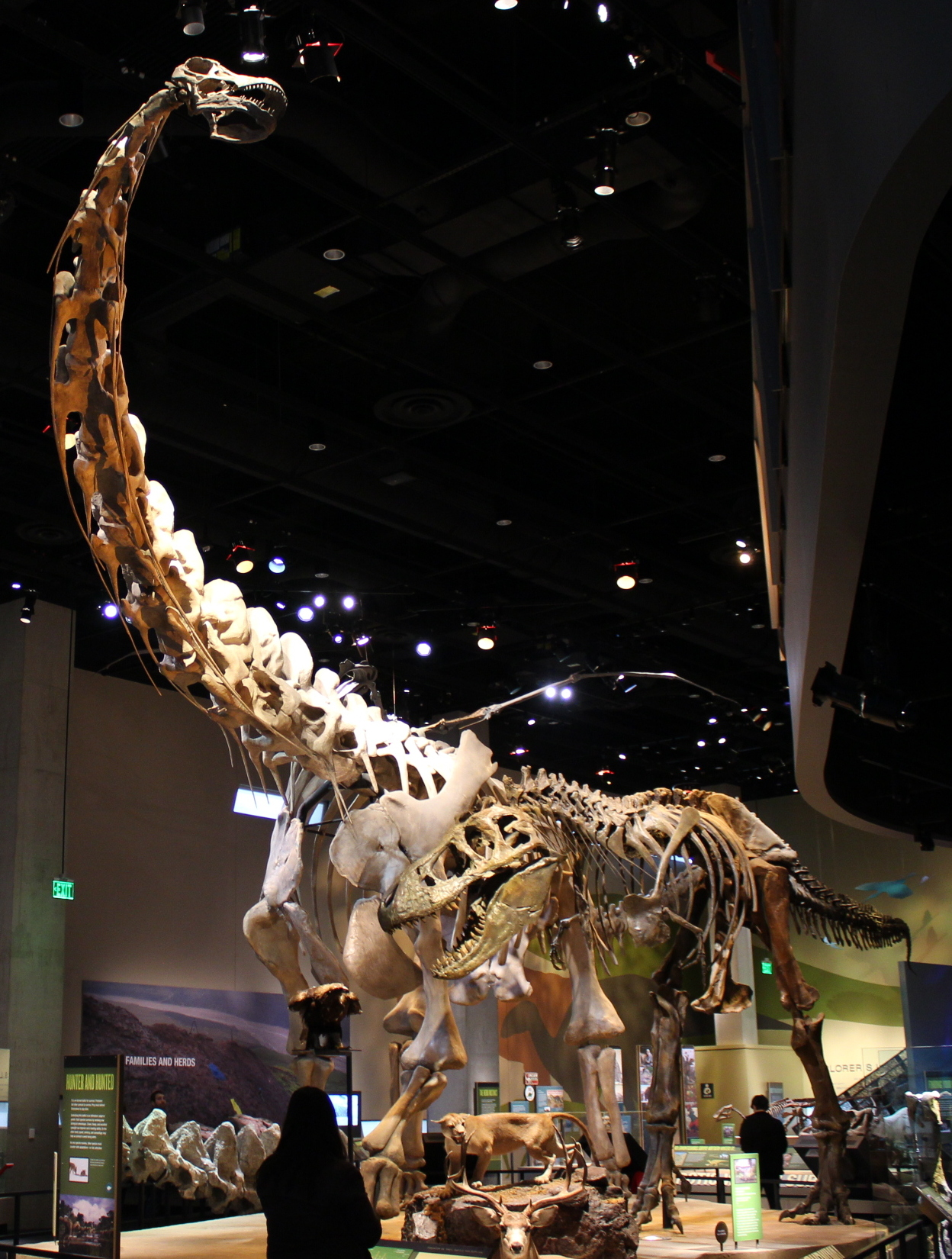
Skeletal mounts of Alamosaurus and Tyrannosaurus, giant dinosaurs characteristic of the fauna Quetzalcoatlus inhabited

Definitive fossils of Quetzalcoatlus have only been found from the Javelina Formation of Texas, though similar and potentially congeneric azhdarchids are known from isolated bones across North America. The formation consists of around 140 m (460 ft) of fluvial deposits from the middle to late Maastrichtian, and is gradually overlain by Black Peaks Formation which contains the Cretaceous–Paleogene boundary. At the time of sedimentation, the coastline of the seaway was around 300 to 400 km (190 to 250 mi) southeast of the formation. The fauna is dominated by the large sauropod Alamosaurus, which has been considered characteristic of the fauna of the Lancian of southern Laramidia, with Quetzalcoatlus noted in association despite its relative inabundance. Specimens of Quetzalcoatlus are only known from the upper half of the formation where they are the most common vertebrate, with magnetostratigraphy and uranium–lead dating demonstrating that these deposits were from the latest Maastrichtian around 67 to 66 million years ago. Additional pterosaur specimens that may be Quetzalcoatlus are found in older parts of the formation, though the single oldest pterosaur fossil belongs to the azhdarchid Wellnhopterus. As Q. lawsoni is known only from the upper part of the formation, and those of Q. northropi are from the top of the Javelina or the base of the Black Peaks Formations, it is possible that the three taxa succeeded each other, though uncertainty allows for some overlap of the species of Quetzalcoatlus.

Even if Q. lawsoni and Q. northropi coexisted, their remains are found in different facies so they may have lived in different habitats. Specimens of Q. northropi are found in stream-channel deposits consisting of sandstone and conglomerate, where scattered skeletons, limb bones of Alamosaurus, and local log jams are also found. In places, the conglomerates contain accumulations of small bones such as vertebrae, scales, teeth, and osteoderms of gar, fish, turtles, and crocodilians, and shells of gastropods. The flow in these streams fluctuated dramatically and was possibly ephemeral with short duration flooding events. While abandoned channel-lake deposits are the least common in the formation, most specimens of Q. lawsoni have been found in them. As the channels were abandoned or cut off from active flow, the lakes would develop where sediments would accumulate and occasionally be flooded by nearby streams. Burrows can be found throughout these deposits, bones are normally excrusted with calcite, and the carbonates present suggest photosynthetic algae and microbes as found in alkaline lakes. The lakes were several hundred meters wide but only a few meters deep at their maximum extent, though the main fossil layer is from a single prolonged lake development.

The overbanks surrounding the channels and lakes were covered in a mature forest represented by Javelinoxylon and araucariaceaen conifers showing a warm, dry, and nonseasonal environment of a tropical lowland. Much of the wood is infested with dry-wood termites. Slender aquatic vines and palm fronds and stalks can be found throughout the abandoned channel-lake deposits. Bioturbation in the lakes show it supported an abundant fauna of soft-bodied invertebrates including crustaceans, insects and annelids with intermittent freshwater bivalves and gastropods. Common aquatic vertebrates found elsewhere are absent, suggesting an inhospitable environment that was perhaps too alkaline. Q. lawsoni may have fed on the invertebrate fauna, and has a body plan similar to modern wading birds found in alkaline environments such as cranes and storks. The area surrounding lakes was vegetated with palmetto palms and trees in an evergreen or semideciduous forest with a closed canopy over 30 m (98 ft) tall. No nearby elevation or branches were present to assist with launching for Q. lawsoni so it must have been capable of takeoff from limited open spaces and of aerial maneuvering in dense forest. Q. northropi in contrast is found in channels suggesting a riparian habitat and more solitary lifestyle, but its absence from other similar riparian habitats of the time suggests something was preferable about the Javelina environment. The floodplain would have has a mean average temperature of 16–22 °C (61–72 °F) and a dry and nonseasonal climate, so if Quetzalcoatlus did migrate in flocks, it would not have been in response to seasonality. The closest modern equivalent to the environment of Quetzalcoatlus would be the coastal plains of southern Mexico.

=== Feeding and ecological niche ===
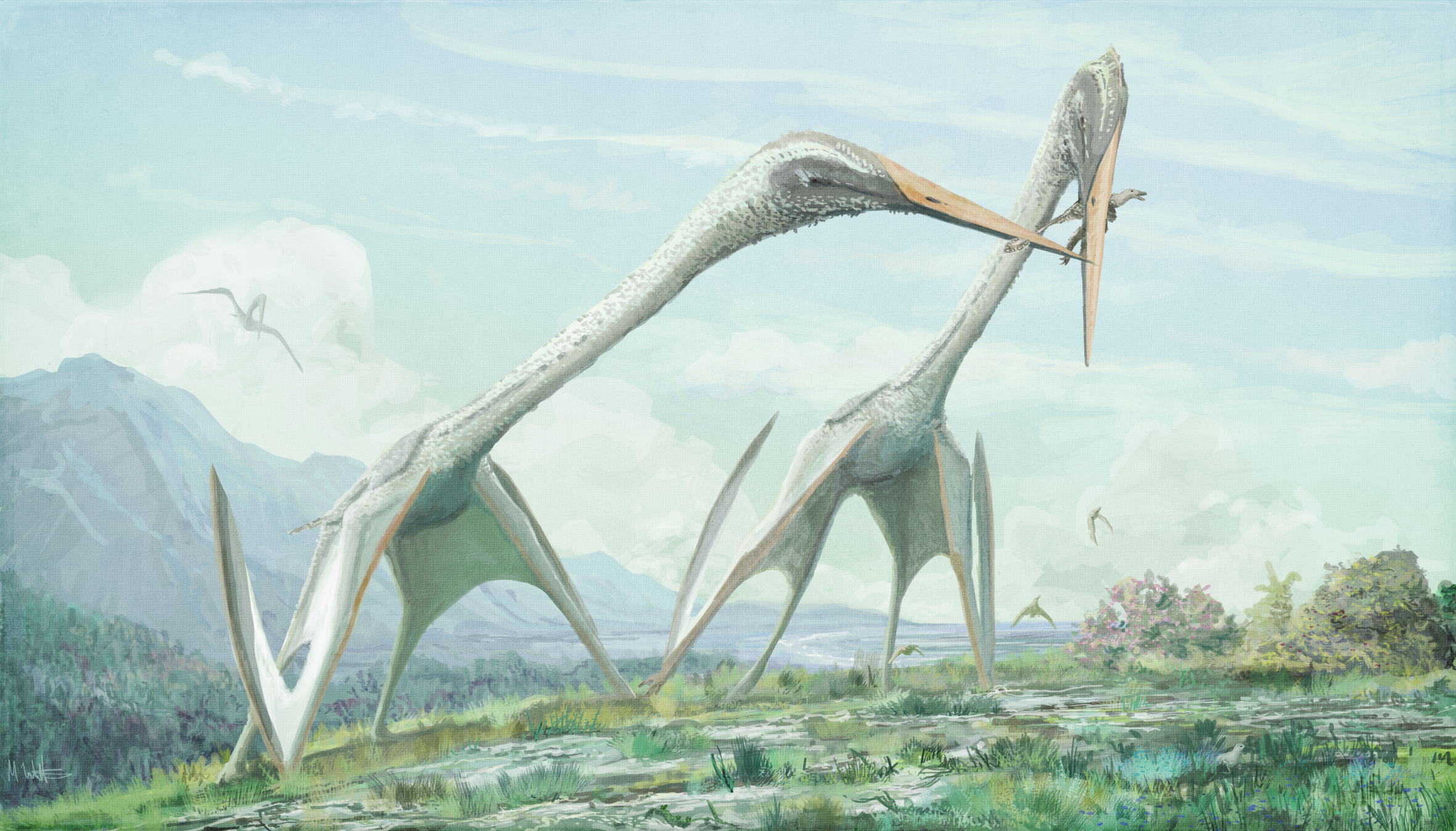
Arambourgiania philadelphiae, a close relative of Quetzalcoatlus, squabbling over a small theropod captured on the ground

In 1975, Douglas Lawson rejected the notion that Quetzalcoatlus might have had a fish-eating (piscivorous) lifestyle like pteranodontids. The Big Bend site where the holotype was discovered is roughly 250 mi (400 km) removed from the coastline, and since Lawson believed that the river systems of the locality were too small to support an animal the size of Q. northropi, he instead suggested that it was a scavenger, similar to vultures. The holotype was found in close association with the skeletons of Alamosaurus, a titanosaur sauropod, which Lawson cited as further evidence. However, David Martill dismissed this connection, noting that the association was nothing more than circumstantial evidence. Due to the light construction of Quetzalcoatlus' beak, it would have had to wait for other predators to open up a carcass before it could feed. Another issue is that, while many scavenging birds have extremely flexible necks allowing them to efficiently probe for meat, Quetzalcoatlus had a stiffer neck, and would not have had the same advantages. Since Q. lawsoni's beak was relatively weak and unhooked, being compared by Wann Langston Jr. to chopsticks, it is unlikely that it could have torn flesh from a carcass. In the coming decades, further hypotheses regarding Quetzalcoatlus' ecology were put forward. Lev Alexandrovich Nesov, in 1984, suggested that Q. northropi and other azhdarchids were piscivorous after all, and that they were ecological analogs to modern skimmers, which feed by skimming the water's surface. He did not, however, indicate any morphological indicators for this behavior, and indeed, azhdarchids lack many of the adaptations necessary for such a feeding method (such as robust, aerodynamic beaks with shock-absorbing structures, and the neck flexibility necessary for skimming). Thus, skimming is very unlikely. Another hypothesis, proposed by Langston, is that azhdarchids probed for burrowing invertebrates, using its beak to pluck them from the substrate. Among the evidence provided by Langston was extensive bioturbation of the strata around Quetzalcoatlus fossils, indicative of extensive invertebrate activity; this has since been suggested to be totally circumstantial. Such a lifestyle has subsequently been suggested for Q. lawsoni. However, wading animals tend to have large, long and broad feet, with a high surface area. This contrasts the morphology seen in Q. lawsoni and other azhdarchids, which had small, narrow feet.

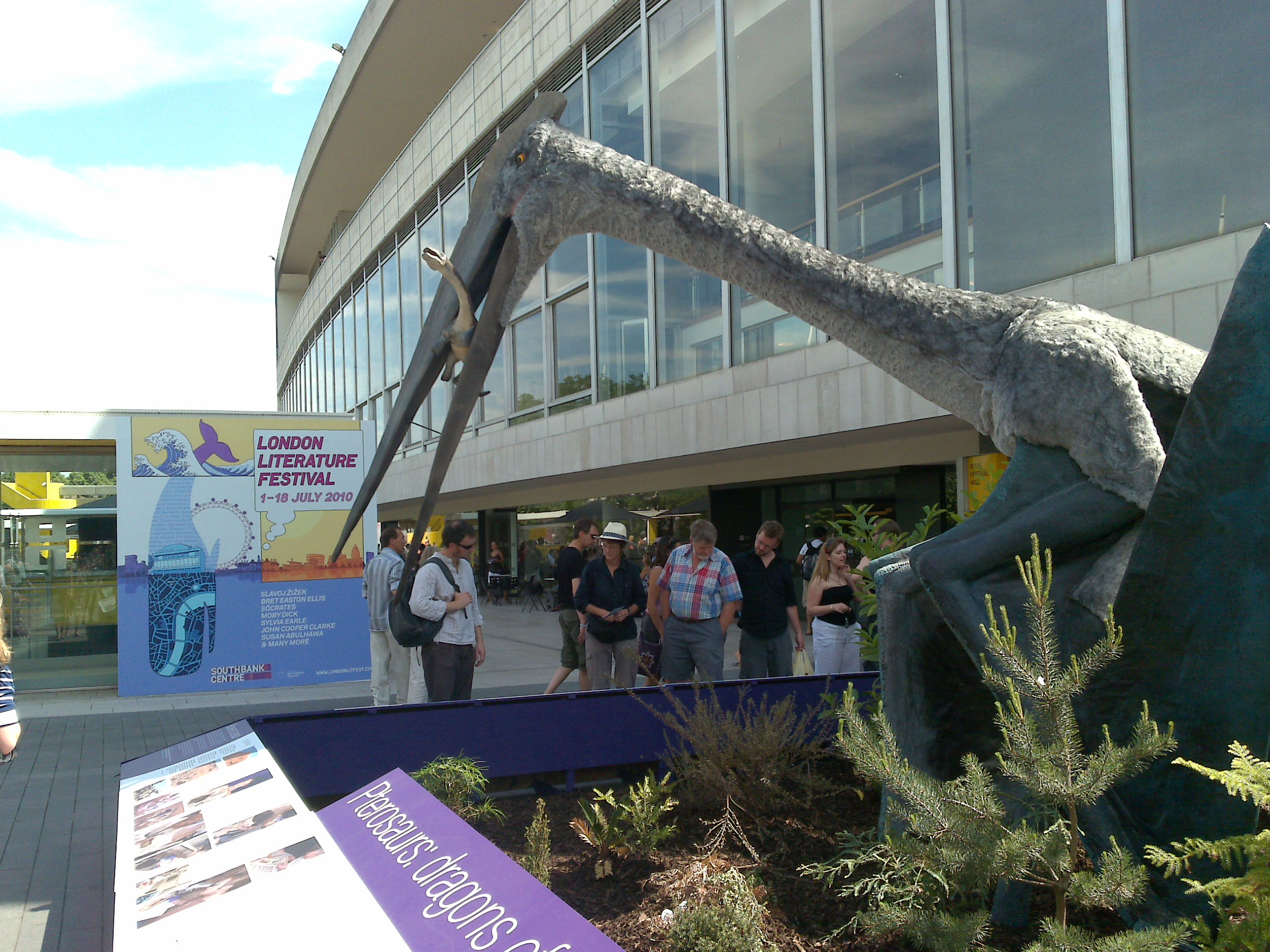
Reconstruction of Q. northropi hunting terrestrially, on London's South Bank for the Royal Society's 350th anniversary exhibition

The predominant model of azhdarchid feeding behavior is the "terrestrial stalking" hypothesis, which suggests that they were terrestrial generalists which fed upon small terrestrial prey, especially small tetrapods. A predecessor to this hypothesis was proposed by Gregory S. Paul in a 1987 correspondence published in the journal Nature. Paul suggested that Q. northropi was analogous to modern storks, specializing in plucking small vertebrates, such as frogs and turtles, from around watercourses. This initial iteration was supported by Sankar Chatterjee and R. J. Templin, who believed that many pterodactyloids adopted such a lifestyle. Lifestyles analogous to modern herons were also proposed by Kevin Padian and Donna Braginetz in 1988, and by S. Christopher Bennett in 2001. In a 2008 paper on the paleoecology of azhdarchids, Mark Witton and Darren Naish reviewed previous models of their ecology and found the majority to be untenable. The anatomy possessed by azhdarchids was, to them, indicative of terrestrial prey capture. They argued that the family were ecologically closest to storks or ground hornbills, and coined the term "terrestrial stalker" to collectively describe them. Witton elaborated in a 2013 book that the proportions of azhdarchids would have been consistent with them striding through vegetated areas with their long limbs, and their downturned skull and jaws reaching the ground. Their long, stiffened necks would be an advantage as it would help lowering and raising the head and give it a vantage point when searching for prey, and enable them to grab small animals and fruit. The internal anatomy of Q. lawsoni's cervical vertebrae suggests that it, and other mid-sized azhdarchids, may have been able to pick up prey animals weighing 9–13 kg (20–29 lb) at maximum; prey size would have been further limited by the size of Q. lawsoni's skull and gullet rather than body mass. Q. lawsoni's skull does not exhibit cranial kinesis, meaning that the skull was essentially a rigid unit, and as such it was likely incapable of masticating hard objects.

Q. northropi fossils have been found in plains deposits, and due to the paucity and location of its remains, was speculated by Thomas Lehman to have been a solitary hunter that favored riparian environments. Q. lawsoni, on the other hand, is found in great numbers in facies that likely represent alkaline lakes. It may have lived like modern gregarious wading birds, feeding on small invertebrates such as annelids, crustaceans and insects that inhabit such environments, and using its beak to probe for burrowing invertebrates. The two species, if contemporaneous, were likely separated by such behavioral and ecological differences. In a 2021 study, Claudio Labita and David Martill suggested that azhdarchids might have been less terrestrial than suggested by Witton and Naish, since azhdarchid fossils were known from marine strata, such as Phosphatodraco from Morocco and Arambourgiania from the phosphates of Jordan. They noted that no azhdarchids had been found in truly terrestrial strata, and proposed they could instead have been associated with aquatic environments, such as rivers, lakes, marine and off-shore settings.

Pterosaurs were generally thought to have gone gradually extinct by decreasing in diversity towards the end of the Cretaceous, but Longrich and colleagues suggested this impression could be a result of the poor fossil records for pterosaurs (the Signor-Lipps Effect). Pterosaurs during this time had increased niche-partitioning compared to earlier faunas from the Santonian and Campanian ages, and they were able to outcompete birds in large size based niches, and birds therefore remained small, not exceeding 2 m (6.6 ft) wingspans during the Late Cretaceous (most pterosaurs during this time had larger wingspans, and thereby avoided the small-size niche). To these researchers, this indicated that the extinction of pterosaurs was abrupt instead of gradual, caused by the catastrophic Chicxulub impact. Their extinction freed up more niches that were then filled by birds, which led to their evolutionary radiation in the Early Cenozoic.

=== Contemporary fauna ===
Beyond the dominant sauropod Alamosaurus the Javelina Formation is known from a diverse vertebrate fauna throughout its channel, overbank, and lake deposits. Both the pterosaurs Quetzalcoatlus and Wellnhopterus are known, and the dinosaur megafauna is represented by the ceratopsids Bravoceratops and Torosaurus utahensis, hadrosaurids assigned to Gryposaurus, Kritosaurus and Saurolophinae, ankylosaurs, and an indeterminate species of Tyrannosaurus. Smaller theropods including the dromaeosaurid Saurornitholestes and an indeterminate troodontid have been found, as well as a variety of fishes, smaller reptiles, and mammals. Most fishes, smaller reptiles and mammals were found through the screening of microfossil localities, which also discovered scraps of dinosaurs. Fish include the stingray Dasyatis, the bowfin, the gar Atractosteus, while amphibians include an indeterminate frog, and reptiles are represented by the lizard Glyptosaurus, the snake Dunnophis, and the crocodile Brachychampsa. Mammals are very common in microfossil sites of both the Black Peaks and Javelina Formations, represented in the latter by the multituberculates Ptilodus, Mesodma, Stygimys, and Viridomys, indeterminate therians, and the metatherians Peratherium, Gelastops, Bryanictis, Mixodectes, Palaechthon, Eoconodon, Carsioptychus, Haploconus, Ellipsodon, and Promioclaenus.

== Cultural significance ==
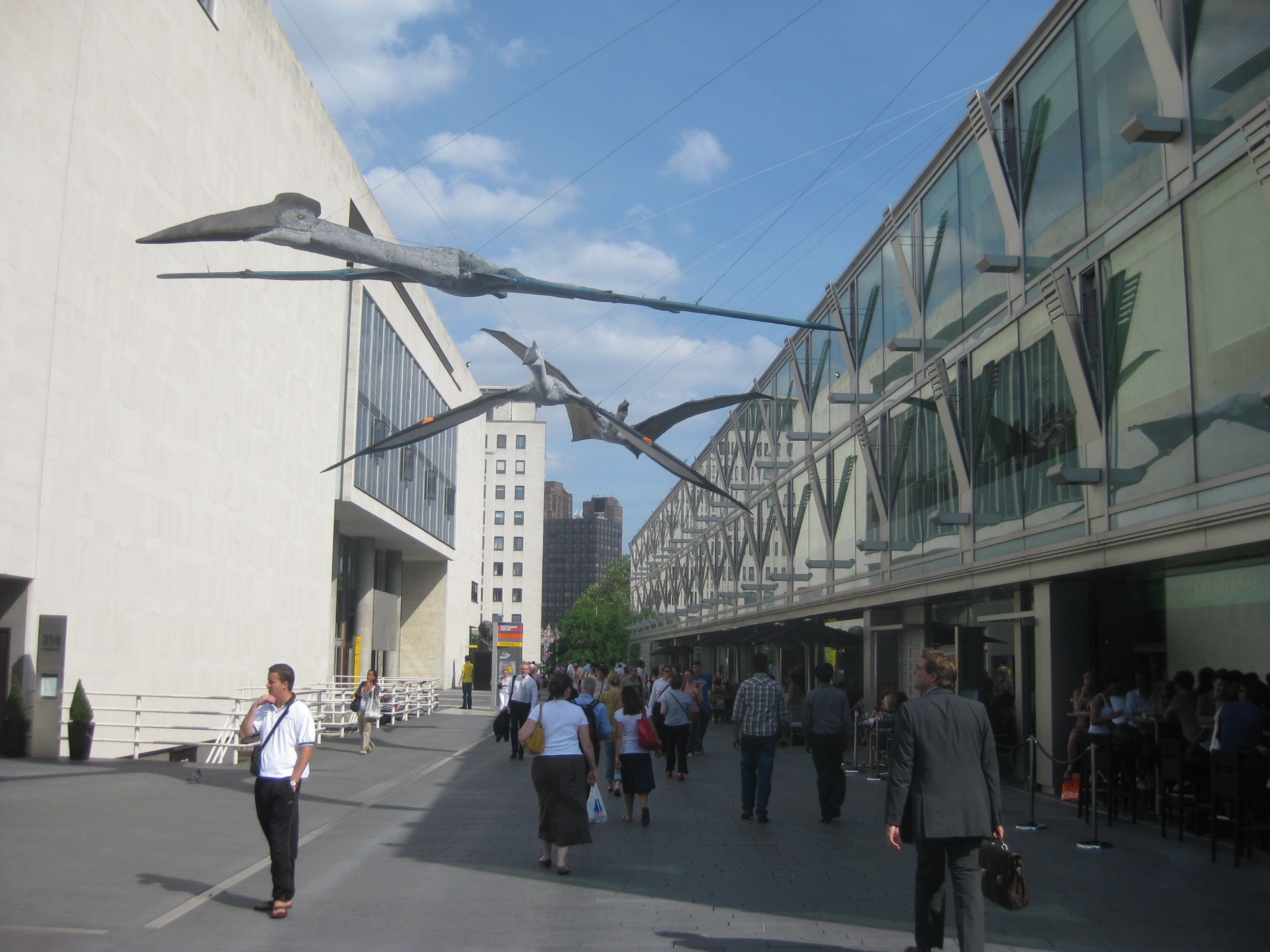
Models of Q. northropi in the air on London's South Bank

In 1975, artist Giovanni Caselli depicted Quetzalcoatlus as a small-headed scavenger with an extremely long neck in the book The evolution and ecology of the Dinosaurs by British paleontologist Beverly Halstead. Over the next twenty-five years prior to future discoveries, it would launch similar depictions colloquially known as "paleomemes" in various books, as noted by Darren Naish.

In 1985, the US Defense Advanced Research Projects Agency (DARPA) and AeroVironment used Q. northropi as the basis for an experimental ornithopter unmanned aerial vehicle (UAV). They produced a half-scale model weighing 18 kg (40 lb), with a wingspan of 5.5 m (18 ft). Coincidentally, Douglas A. Lawson, who discovered Q. northropi in Texas in 1971, named it after John "Jack" Northrop, a developer of tailless flying wing aircraft in the 1940s. The replica of Q. northropi incorporates a "flight control system/autopilot which processes pilot commands and sensor inputs, implements several feedback loops, and delivers command signals to its various servo-actuators". It is on exhibit at the National Air and Space Museum.

In 2010, several life-sized models of Q. northropi were put on display on London's South Bank as the centerpiece exhibit for the Royal Society's 350th-anniversary exhibition. The models, which included both flying and standing individuals with wingspans of over 10 m (33 ft), were intended to help build public interest in science. The models were created by scientists from the University of Portsmouth.

== See also ==
- List of pterosaur genera
- Timeline of pterosaur research
