= Infernodrakon =

Infernodrakon Temporal range: Late Cretaceous, latest Maastrichtian
- Skeletal reconstruction of the holotype

Scientific classification
- Kingdom: Animalia
- Phylum: Chordata
- Class: Reptilia
- Order: †Pterosauria
- Suborder: †Pterodactyloidea
- Clade: †Azhdarchoidea
- Family: †Azhdarchidae
- Clade: †Quetzalcoatlini
- Genus: †Infernodrakon; Thomas et al., 2025
- Species: †I. hastacollis

Binomial name
- †Infernodrakon hastacollis Thomas et al., 2025

Genus of azhdarchid pterosaurs

Infernodrakon (meaning "dragon from hell") is a genus of azhdarchid pterosaurs from the Upper Cretaceous Hell Creek Formation of Montana, United States. The genus contains a single species, I. hastacollis, known from a single neck vertebra. Based on comparisons with related azhdarchids, it probably had a wingspan of about 4.15 m (13.6 ft).

== Discovery and naming ==
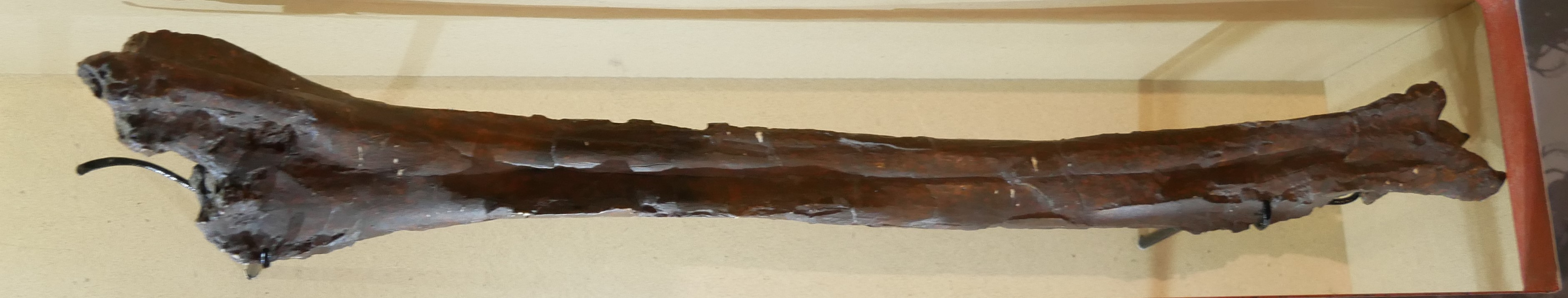
Holotype at the Burpee Museum of Natural History

In 2002, a tyrannosauroid specimen (BMR P2002.4.1, "Jane", now the holotype of Nanotyrannus lethaeus) was recovered from strata belonging to the Maastrichtian-age Hell Creek Formation in Carter County, Montana, United States. Alongside that specimen was the fifth cervical (neck) vertebra of an azhdarchid pterosaur. Catalogued as BMR P2002.2, it was originally assigned to cf. Quetzalcoatlus sp. In 2014, Alexander Averianov identified the specimen as indeterminate azhdarchid. In 2021, Brian Andres and Wann Langston Jr. classified BMR P2002.2 more broadly as an indeterminate azhdarchiform.

In 2025, a team consisting of Emily Thomas, David W. E. Hone, Timothy Gomes, and Joseph E. Peterson re-examined the specimen, determining that it belonged to a novel genus more closely related to Arambourgiania philadelphiae from Jordan than to Quetzalcoatlus. The authors designated BMR P2002.2 as the holotype of a new pterosaur genus and species, Infernodrakon hastacollis.

The generic name, Infernodrakon, combines the Italian word inferno (derived from the Latin infernus), meaning "hell", after the discovery of the holotype in the Hell Creek Formation, with the Ancient Greek δράκων (drakon), meaning "dragon". The specific name, hastacollis, combines "hasta"—a type of Roman spear—with the Latin root collum, meaning "neck", referencing the extremely long and thin morphology of the preserved vertebra. This name also references the specific epithet of the related Azhdarcho lancicollis, which is derived from the Roman lancea javelin. The intended full binomial name meaning is "spear-necked dragon from Hell".

== Description ==
Size compared to a human

Infernodrakon is known only from a single neck vertebra measuring 35 cm (14 in) long. This bone is extremely elongated and gracile; the ratio of the preserved length to the width at the middle of the centrum ('elongation ratio') is 15.1. The only comparable ratios in azhdarchids are found in quetzalcoatlines, such as 16.3 in Quetzalcoatlus lawsoni. All other azhdarchids for which this ratio can be determined demonstrate ratios below 6. Based on comparisons with related taxa, the maximum straight-line wingspan of Infernodrakon was likely close to 4.15 m (13.6 ft). Considering the natural curvature of the wing, the wingspan would have been shorter, at around 3–4 m (9.8–13.1 ft). As such, it is comparable in size to Quetzalcoatlus lawsoni (4.8 m (16 ft)) and Zhejiangopterus.

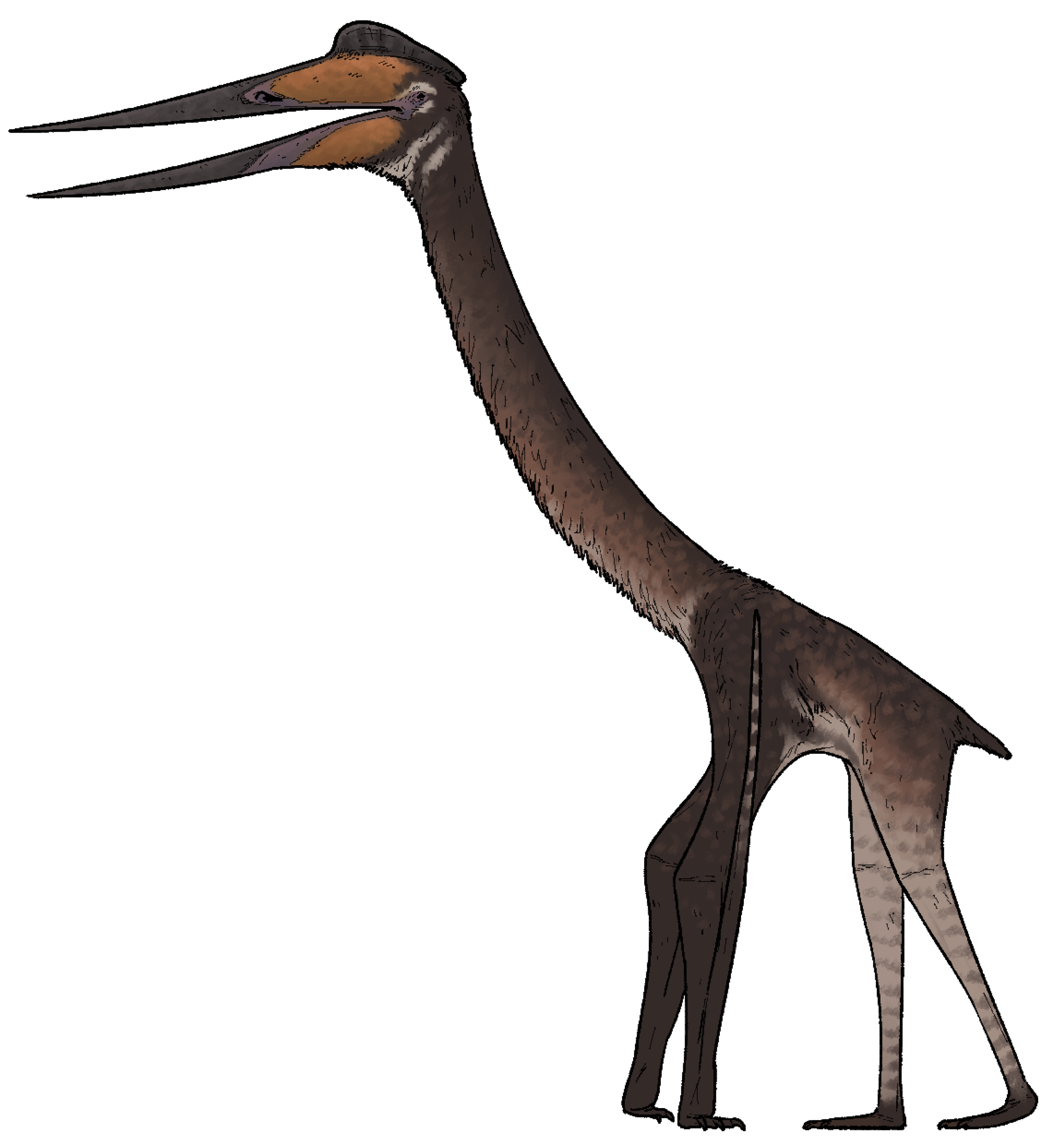
Speculative life restoration

The holotype likely belongs to an adult or a nearly mature individual, since the external surface of the vertebra had a smooth texture unlike the textures of the vertebra in immature pterosaurs. The other feature that distinguishes Infernodrakon from all other known azhdarchids is the presence of accessory pneumatic foramen (air sac hole) dorsal to the opening of the posterior neural canal (the rear exit of the spinal canal). In all other azhdarchids, the pneumatic foramen is dorsal or lateral to the opening of the anterior neural canal (the front entrance of the spinal canal), or to both the anterior and posterior neural canal opening. Additionally, the size of the anterior neural canal opening in Infernodrakon is significantly larger than in other azhdarchids.

== Classification ==
To assess the relationships of Infernodrakon, Thomas et al. (2025) scored it in the comprehensive pterosaur-focused phylogenetic matrix of Pêgas, 2024. They recovered Infernodrakon as the sister taxon to Arambourgiania within the azhdarchid clade Quetzalcoatlinae. These results are displayed in the cladogram below:

- Azhdarchidae
  - - Aralazhdarcho
    - - Eurazhdarcho
      - - Phosphatodraco
        - Wellnhopterus
  - - - Azhdarcho
      - Cryodrakon
    - Quetzalcoatlinae
      - - Zhejiangopterus
        - - Aerotitan
          - Mistralazhdarcho
      - - - Albadraco
          - Hatzegopteryx
        - - Thanatosdrakon
          - - - Quetzalcoatlus lawsoni
              - Quetzalcoatlus northropi
              - FSAC-OB 14
                (Ouled Abdoun Basin, aff. Quetzalcoatlus)
              - UCMP 114286
                (Lance Formation, cf. Quetzalcoatlus)
            - - Infernodrakon
              - - Arambourgiania
                - MPPM 2000.23.1
                  (Coon Creek Formation, Arambourgiania sp.)

== Paleobiology ==
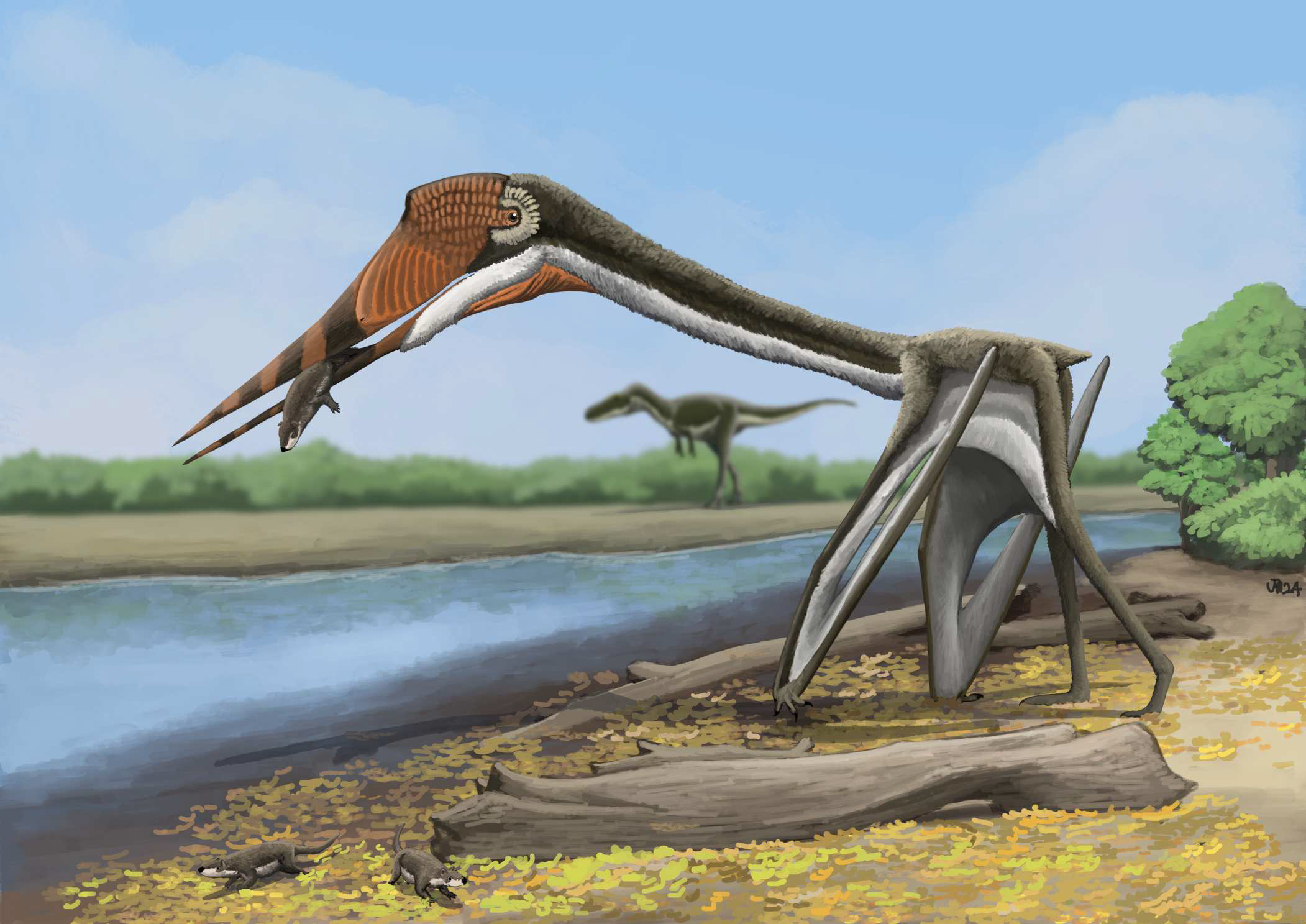
Reconstruction of Infernodrakon foraging in its environment

Though azhdarchid lifestyles have long been debated, more recent analyses suggest that they hunted small terrestrial prey. This model is known as the 'terrestrial stalking' hypothesis. Prey size in azhdarchids would have been limited primarily by torso size, the morphology (and accordingly strength) of their cervical vertebrae, and skull width. Infernodrakon, being a mid-sized azhdarchid with gracile neck vertebrae, would have likely been poorly adapted to the stresses of handling or swallowing large animals. As such, it can be identified as a mesopredator, likely consuming small animals including juvenile archosaurs, squamates (lizards and snakes), mammals, amphibians, and eggs.
