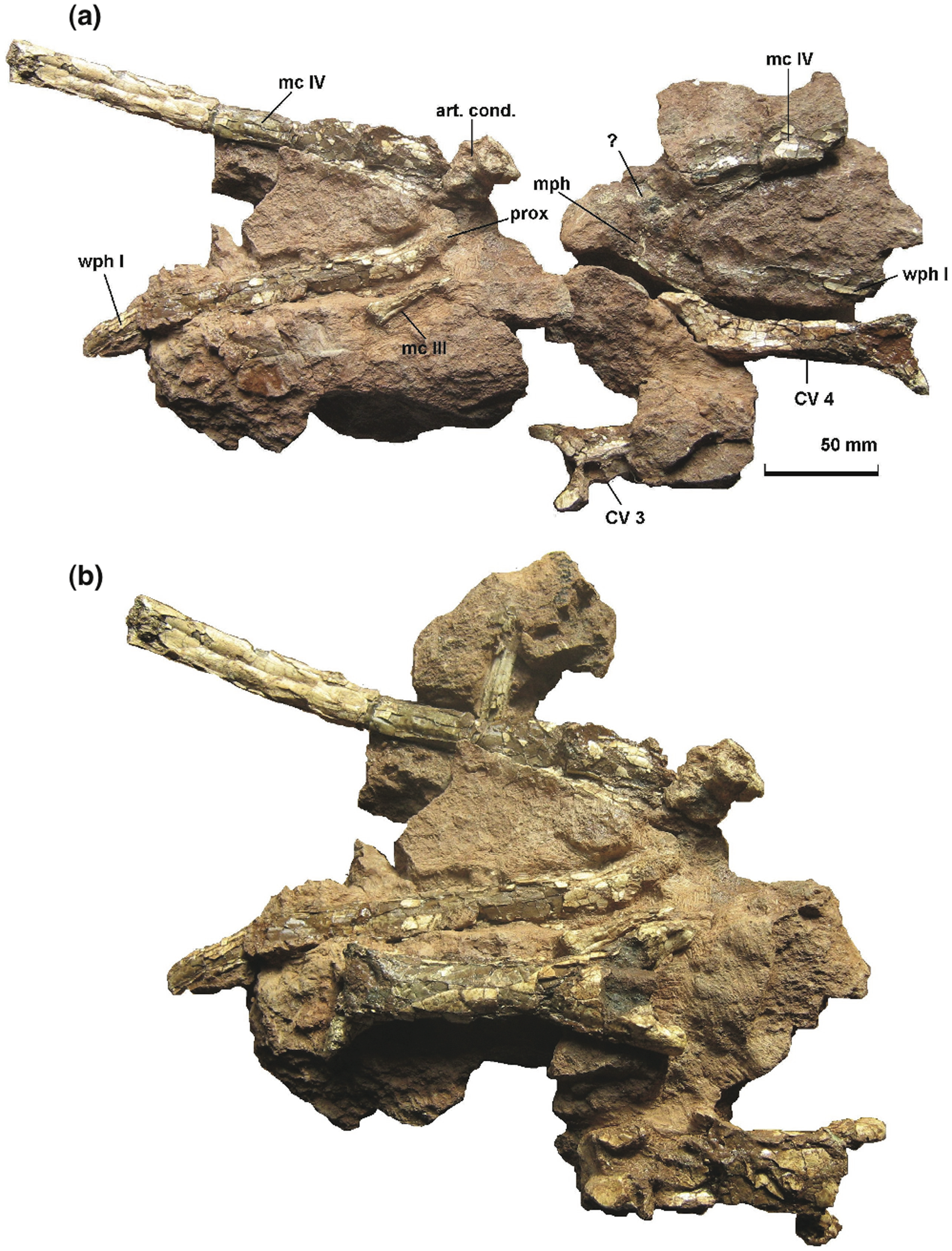
- Preserved elements re-assembled as found in partial articulation

Scientific classification
- Kingdom: Animalia
- Phylum: Chordata
- Class: Reptilia
- Order: †Pterosauria
- Suborder: †Pterodactyloidea
- Clade: †Azhdarchoidea
- Family: †Azhdarchidae
- Genus: †Eurazhdarcho; Vremir et al., 2013
- Species: †E. langendorfensis

Binomial name
- †Eurazhdarcho langendorfensis Vremir et al., 2013

= Eurazhdarcho =

Eurazhdarcho Temporal range: Late Cretaceous, 69 Ma

Genus of azhdarchid pterosaur from the Late Cretaceous

Eurazhdarcho is a genus of azhdarchid pterosaur that lived during the Maastrichtian age of the Late Cretaceous period in what is now Romania, about 69 million years ago. Starting in 2009, pterosaur fossil remains were unearthed in a layer of the Sebeș Formation in Lancrăm, southwestern Transylvania by paleontologist Mátyás Vremir. In 2013, he, along with paleontologists Alexander Kellner, Darren Naish, and Gareth Dyke would name the new genus and type species Eurazhdarcho langendorfensis. Its generic name is a combination of Europe and the genus Azhdarcho, while its specific name is in reference to its origin from Langendorf (the name of Lancrăm in the language of the German ethnic minority in Romania). The holotype specimen of Eurazhdarcho consists of a partial skeleton that includes cervical (neck) vertebrae, metacarpal, and phalanx fragments. The related and much larger azhdarchid Hatzegopteryx has also been found in the same location, indicating a possibility that Eurazhdarcho may have a juvenile of this pterosaur. However, the describers deemed this unlikely as its fossils seem to represent an adult specimen.

With extrapolations from the comparisons of cervical vertebrae and wingbones of Eurazhdarcho with those of the related azhdarchid Zhejiangopterus from China, Vremir and colleagues would estimate a wingspan not surpassing 3 m (9 ft 10 in). This makes Eurazhdarcho a medium size member of its family, Azhdarchidae. The distinctive traits that the describers set for Eurazhdarcho are all found in its cervical vertebrae. Within Azhdarchidae, the position of Eurazhdarcho has been somewhat disputed, with some studies recovering it within the subfamily Quetzalcoatlinae, while others have found it in a basal (primitive) position within the family. Due to the abundance of terrestrial fauna in the Sebeș Formation, it has been suggested that Eurazhdarcho most likely fed by snatching small terrestrial prey while walking on all fours instead of being a fish-eater on the coast.

== Discovery and naming ==
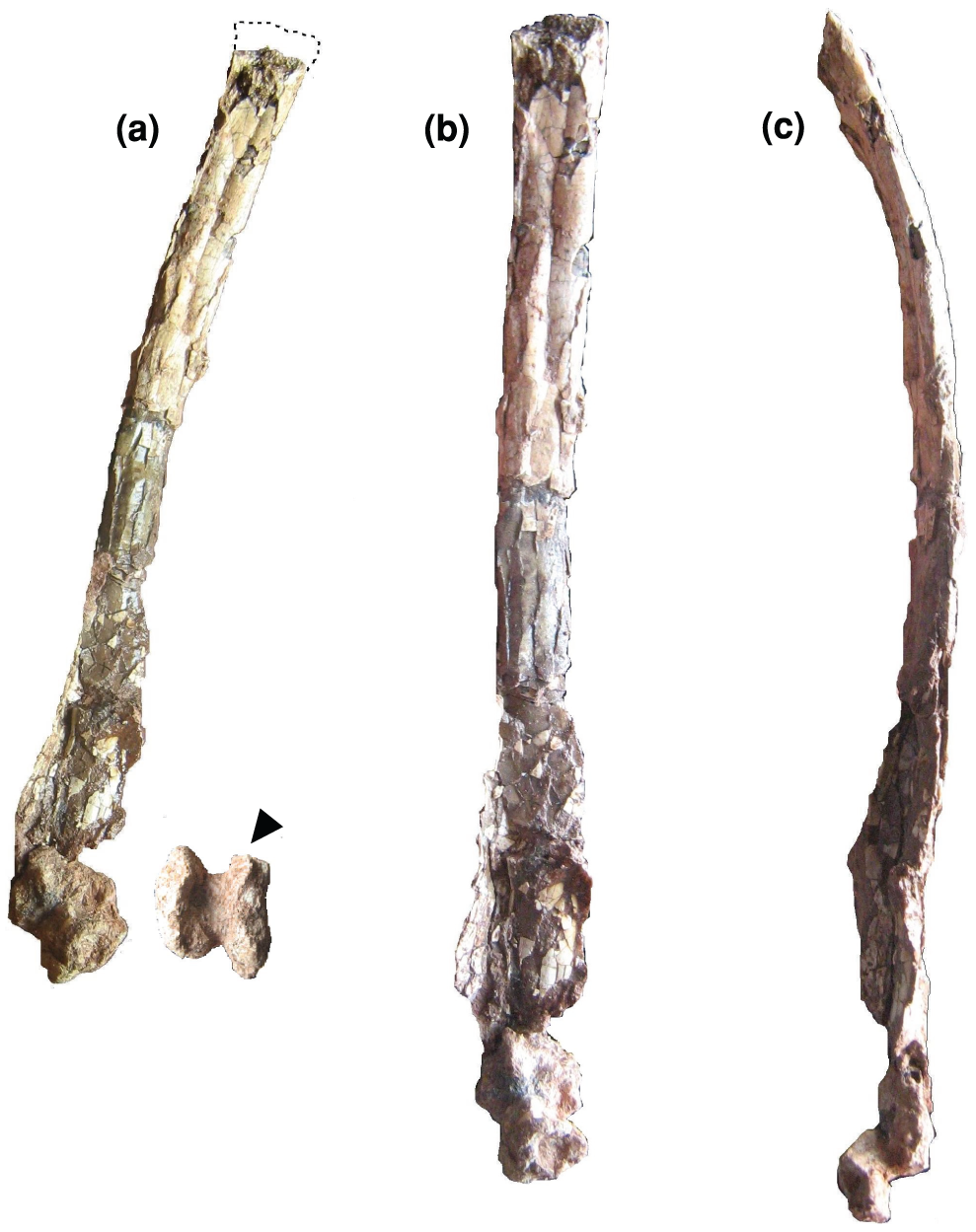
Fourth metacarpal

In 2009, Romanian paleontologist Mátyás Vremir uncovered the remains of a pterosaur at the SbG-B site of the Sebeș Formation in Lancrăm, near Sebeș-Glod in southwestern Transylvania, Romania. He donated these to the Erdélyi Múzeum of the Societății Muzeului Ardelean (Transylvanian Museum Society). Subsequent excavations by Vremir discovered additional bones of the same individual animal and were added by him to the collection of the Babeș-Bolyai University.

In 2013, Vremir, along with paleontologists Alexander Kellner, Darren Naish, and Gareth Dyke named and described a new genus and type species, Eurazhdarcho langendorfensis. The generic name Eurazhdarcho combines the name of Europe with that of the related pterosaur Azhdarcho. The specific name langendorfensis refers to its provenance from Langendorf, which is the name of Lancrăm in the language of the German ethnic minority in Romania. The article appeared in the electronic journal PLoS ONE without an accompanying printed version; it nevertheless validly names the taxon under the new rules of the ICZN.

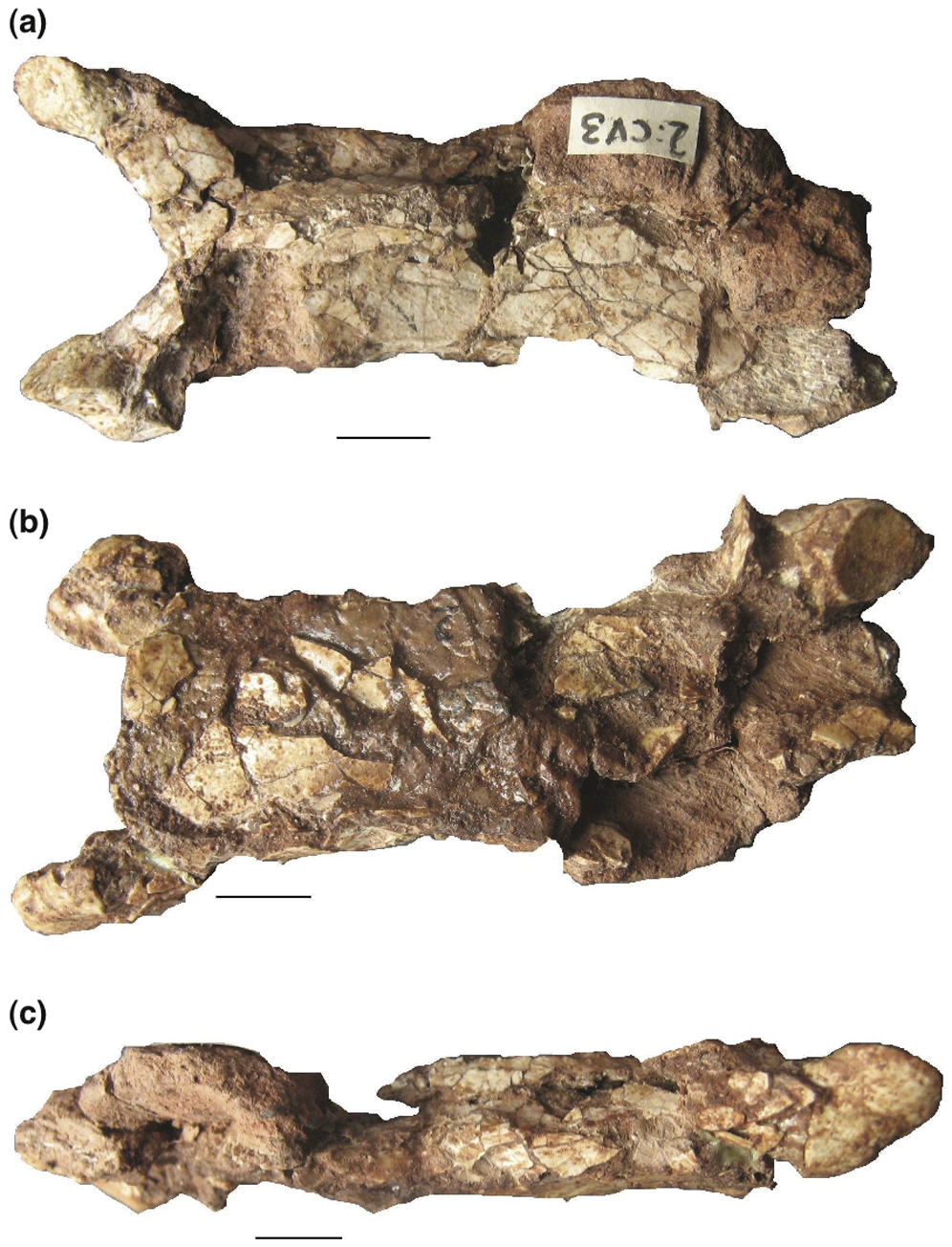
Third cervical vertebra

The holotype specimen, EME VP 312, was found in a layer of the Sebeș Formation dating from the upper Early Maastrichtian, about 69 million years old. It consists of a partial skeleton lacking the skull. It includes three cervical (neck) vertebrae among which the almost complete third and the fourth; the third and fourth right metacarpal; the upper part of the first phalanx of the wing finger; the lower part of the second phalanx; a lower phalanx of one of the other fingers and a number of undetermined fragments. The Babeș-Bolyai University material is included within this enumeration and is not indicated by a separate inventory number. Generally, the quality of the bones is poor, with much of the outer cortex broken or eroded and internal structures present as impressions of natural molds. The fossils have not been completely flattened, preserving three-dimensionality, but compression has caused some distortion. The carcass had probably by flooding been deposed on its back in mud near a riverbank. Afterwards it was exposed to the air, weathering and being scavenged as proven by circular bite-marks inflicted by the conical teeth of some member of the Crocodyliformes. Later covered by a thin layer of dirt, it was damaged by beetles and termites.

The describers of Eurazhdarcho noted that the related giant pterosaur Hatzegopteryx is known from the same Romanian layers; the known fossil material from both genera does not overlap. Vremir and colleagues considered a juvenile identity for Eurazhdarcho with respect to Hatzegopteryx to be unlikely because the much smaller EME VP 312 seems to represent an adult individual.

== Description ==
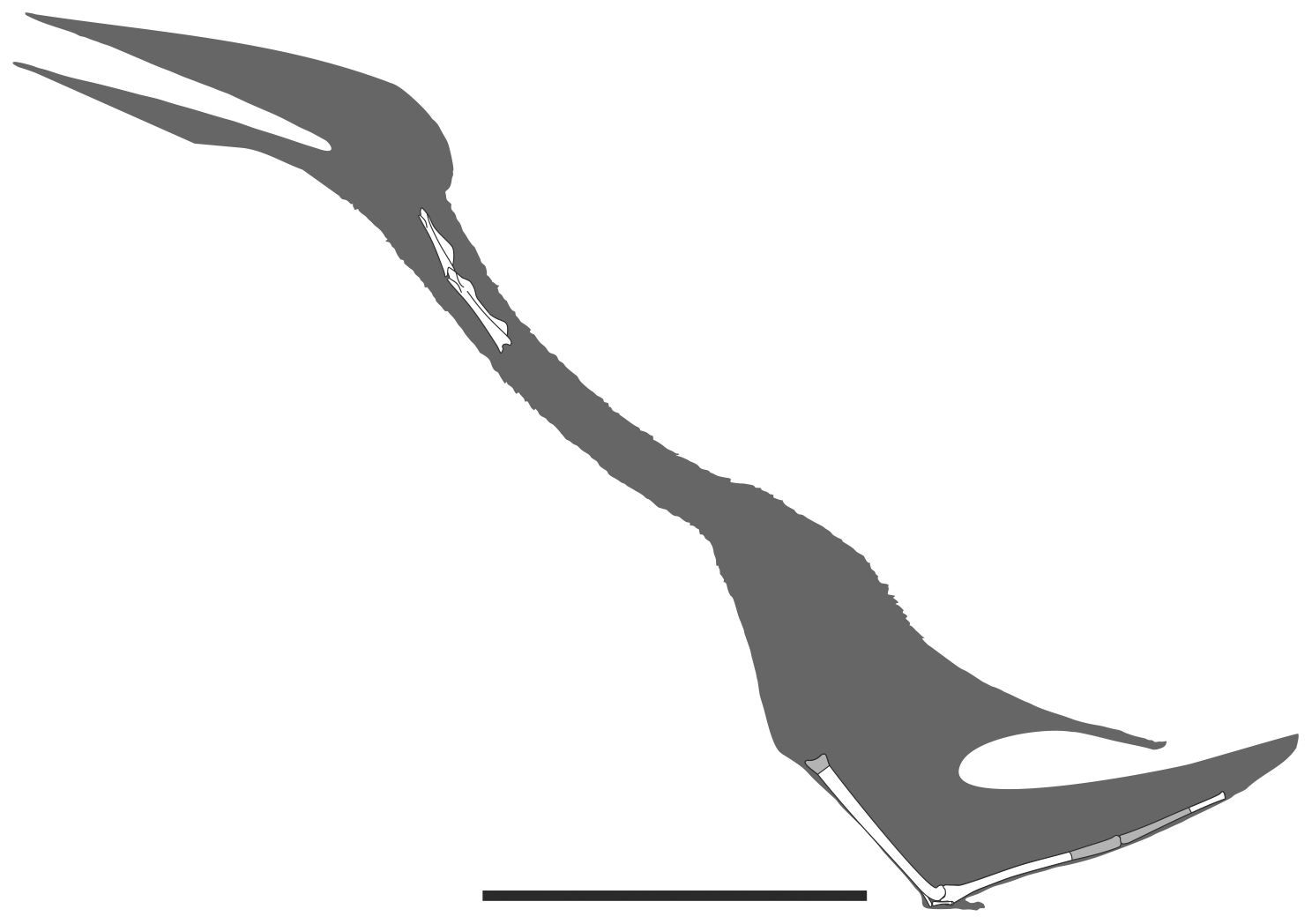
Silhouette restoration showing the known remains in white

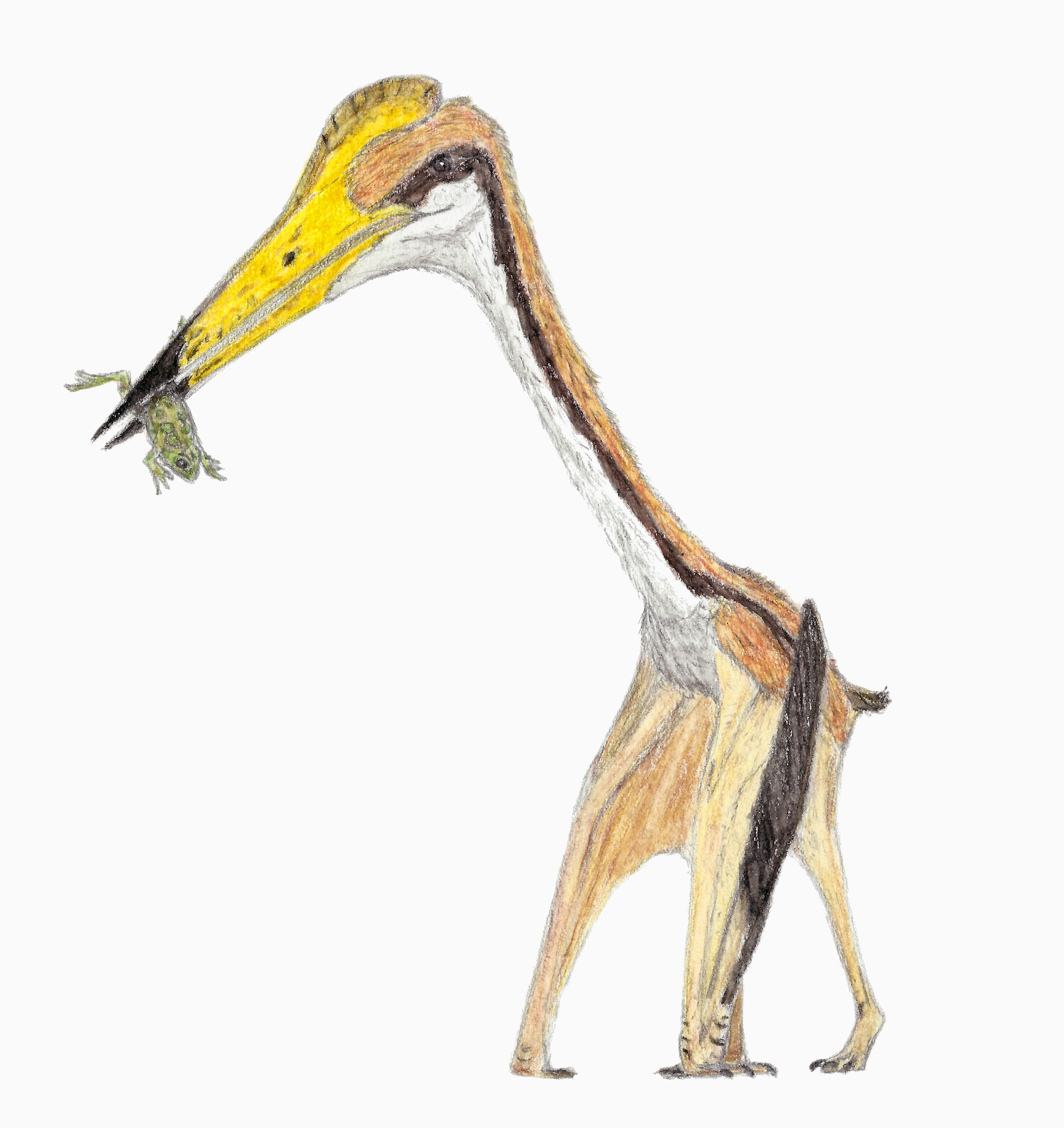
Life restoration in terrestrial pose

Eurazhdarcho is a medium-sized member of Azhdarchidae, the family to which it belongs. Comparing the cervical vertebrae and wingbones of the largest adult and most complete specimen of Zhejiangopterus, Vremir and colleagues noted that the length of the fourth cervical is roughly the same as in specimen EME VP 312 of Eurazhdarcho, while the estimated length of the fourth metacarpal is substantially less, 250 mm (9.8 in) in Eurazhdarcho versus 336 mm (1 ft 1.2 in) in Zhejiangopterus. Extrapolating from this data, Vremir and colleagues estimated the wingspan of Eurazhdarcho at no more than 3 m (9 ft 10 in).

Vremir and colleagues established some distinctive traits for Eurazhdarcho, all present in the cervical vertebrae. The third neck vertebra has three-quarters of the length of the fourth vertebra, whereas 60 percent would be normal with azhdarchids. The necks of the prezygapophyses, the front joint processes, are well-developed and elongated, obliquely pointing forwards and outwards under an angle of 30 degrees with the long axis of the vertebra. The preexapophysis, a secondary joint process on the side of the prezygapophysis, is well-developed with a forward pointing articulation facet and separated from a process, itself the remains of the diapophysis and possibly a neck rib, on the outer base of the prezygapophysis, by a deep trough on its underside. The pneumatic openings, the entrance holes for the air sacks, at the sides of the neural arch are small and placed in a low position.

== Classification ==
In its description, Eurazhdarcho was assigned to the family Azhdarchidae, based on the method of comparative anatomy. However, a cladistic analysis was not performed. In his 2021 study of Quetzalcoatlus, American paleontologist Brian Andres included Eurazhdarcho in his phylogenetic analysis. He placed Eurazhdarcho in the subfamily Quetzalcoatlinae within Azhdarchidae. His analysis is shown in the first cladogram below. In 2023, paleontologist Rubi Pêgas and colleagues recovered Eurazhdarcho in a different position within Azhdarchidae. They found it forming a clade with azhdarchids Phosphatodraco, Wellnhopterus, and Aralazhdarcho in a basal (primitive) position within the family. This classification model would be followed by a few subsequent studies. Their phylogenetic analysis is shown in the second cladogram below.

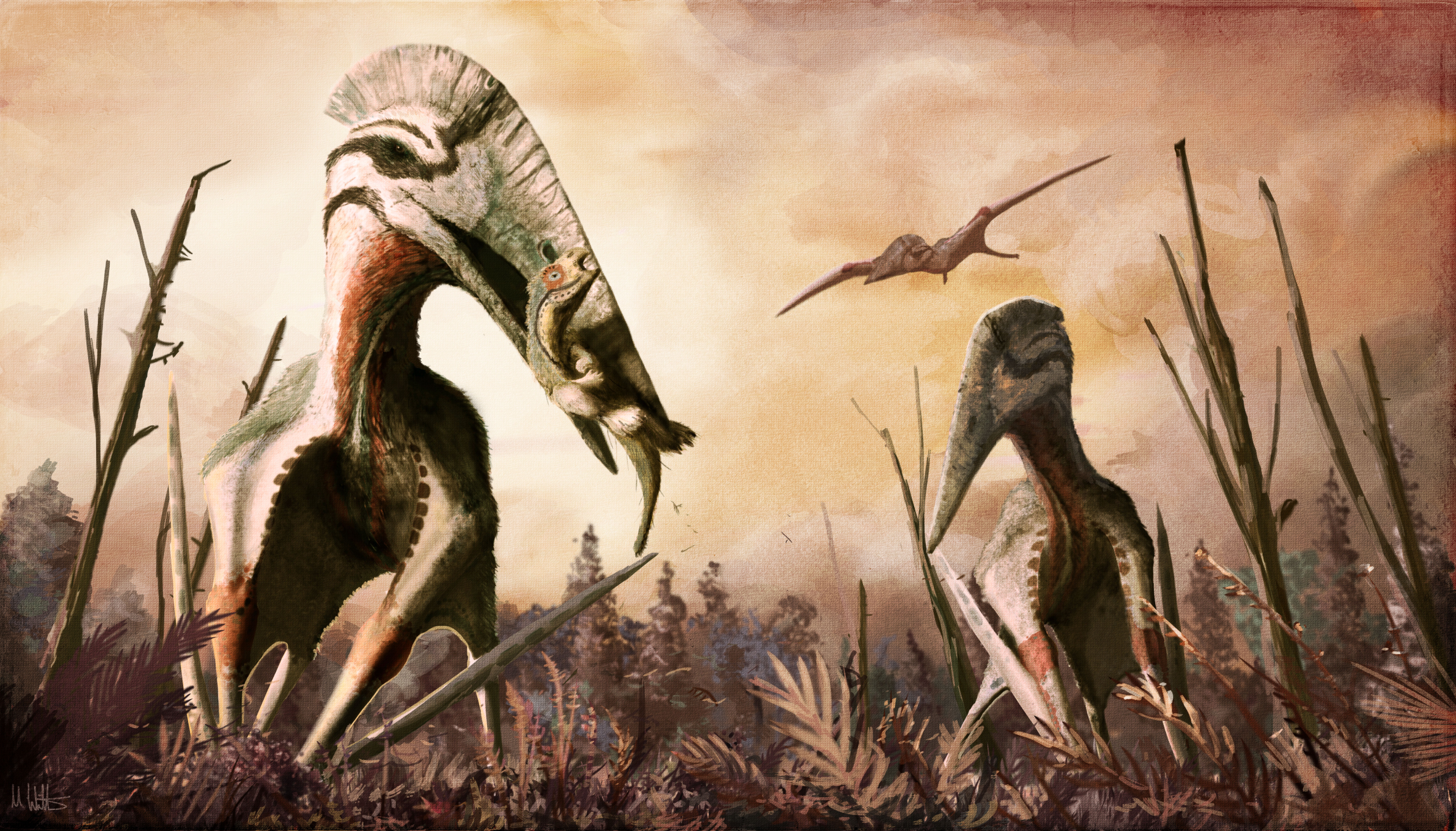
Life reconstruction of the azhdarchid Hatzegopteryx feeding on the ground. This pterosaur was found in the same location as Eurazhdarcho

Topology 1: Andres (2021).

- Azhdarchidae
  - Azhdarchinae
    - Azhdarcho lancicollis
    - - Albadraco tharmisensis
      - - Aerotitan sudamericanus
        - Mistralazhdarcho maggii
  - Quetzalcoatlinae
    - - Aralazhdarcho bostobensis
      - Phosphatodraco mauritanicus
    - - Eurazhdarcho langendorfensis
      - - Zhejiangopterus linhaiensis
        - - Wellnhopterus brevirostris
          - Cryodrakon boreas
          - - Hatzegopteryx thambema
            - - Arambourgiania philadelphiae
              - - Quetzalcoatlus lawsoni
                - Quetzalcoatlus northropi

Topology 2: Pêgas and colleagues (2023).

- Azhdarchidae
  - - Eurazhdarcho langendorfensis
    - - Phosphatodraco mauritanicus
      - Wellnhopterus brevirostris
      - Aralazhdarcho bostobensis
  - - Zhejiangopterus linhaiensis
    - - Azhdarcho lancicollis
      - Quetzalcoatlinae
        - Cryodrakon boreas
        - - - Hatzegopteryx thambema
            - Albadraco tharmisensis
          - - - Quetzalcoatlus northropi
              - Quetzalcoatlus lawsoni
              - Quetzalcoatlus sp. (FSAC-OB 14)
            - - Mistralazhdarcho maggii
              - Aerotitan sudamericanus
              - Arambourgiania philadelphiae

== Paleobiology ==
The area where Eurazhdarcho was found, in the Upper Cretaceous was localized on the Hațeg Island, part of the prehistoric European archipelago in the ancient Tethys Sea. The SbG-B site, though encompassing a surface of just 200 m^{2} (2,200 sq ft), has yielded several distinct animal species, among which are the turtle Kallokibotion bajazidi, the hadrosaur Telmatosaurus and the titanosaur Magyarosaurus. This terrestrial fauna suggests that Eurazdarcho was not a coastal piscivore catching fish on the wing, affirming the "superstork" model for azhdarchids, in which they are terrestrial stalkers snatching small prey animals while walking on all fours.

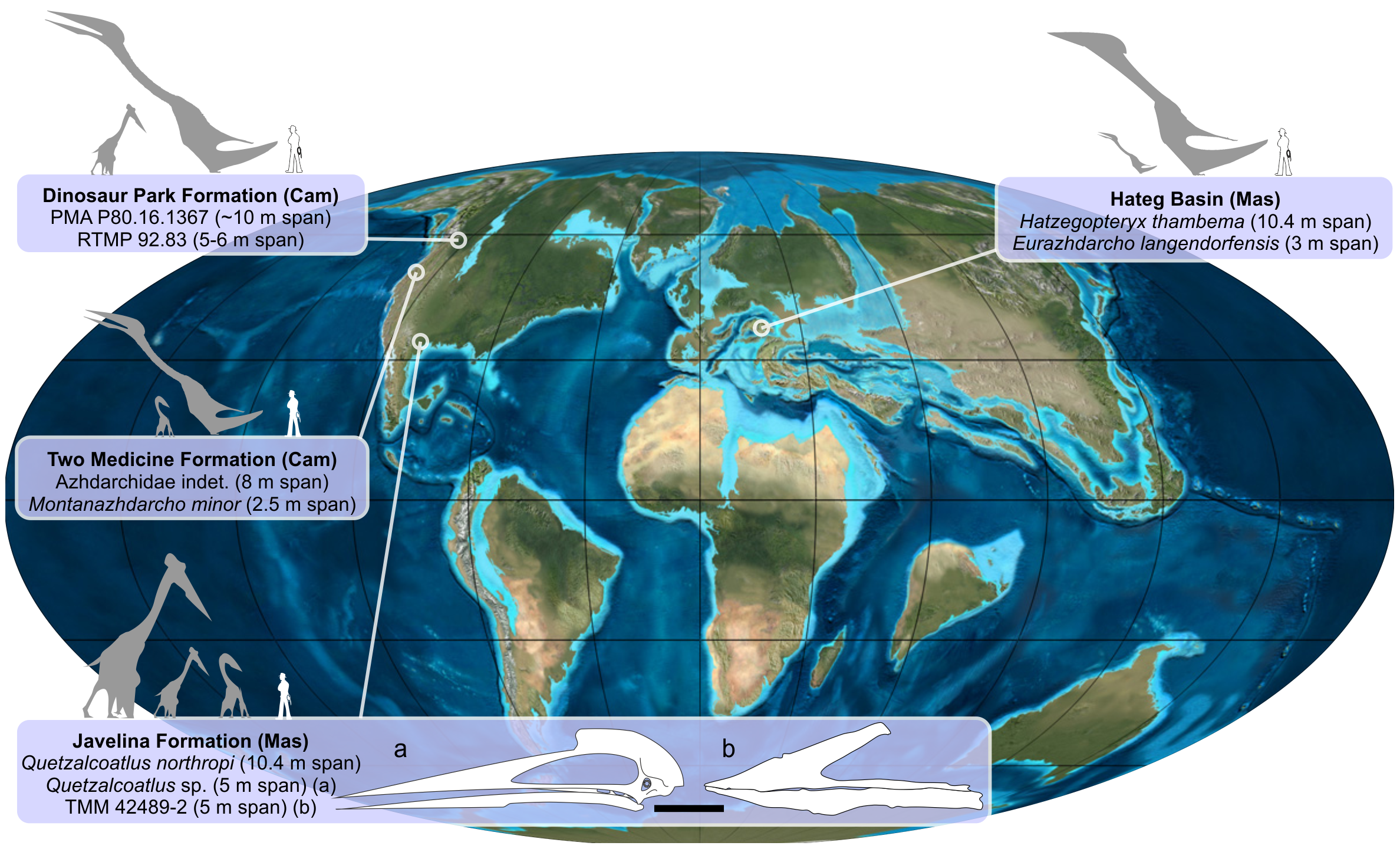
Map of azhdarchid sites with size distinction, notice Hațeg Island with Eurazhdarcho and Hatzegopteryx, shown on the top right

If Eurazhdarcho was indeed distinct from Hatzegopteryx, its discovery implies the presence of two azhdarchid forms in the Hațeg fauna, the one gigantic, the other medium-sized. This suggests a niche partitioning between them, although it is as yet unclear how this correlates with differences in prey preference and hunting techniques. This reflects a pattern seen in other Late Cretaceous faunae which also show a combination of a large azhdarchid species with a smaller one. One such example is the Javelina Formation from the Maastrichtian of Texas, which has brought forth the giant Quetzalcoatlus northropi, but also smaller taxa such as Quetzalcoatlus lawsoni and Wellnhopterus brevirostris.

== See also ==
- List of pterosaur genera
- Timeline of pterosaur research
