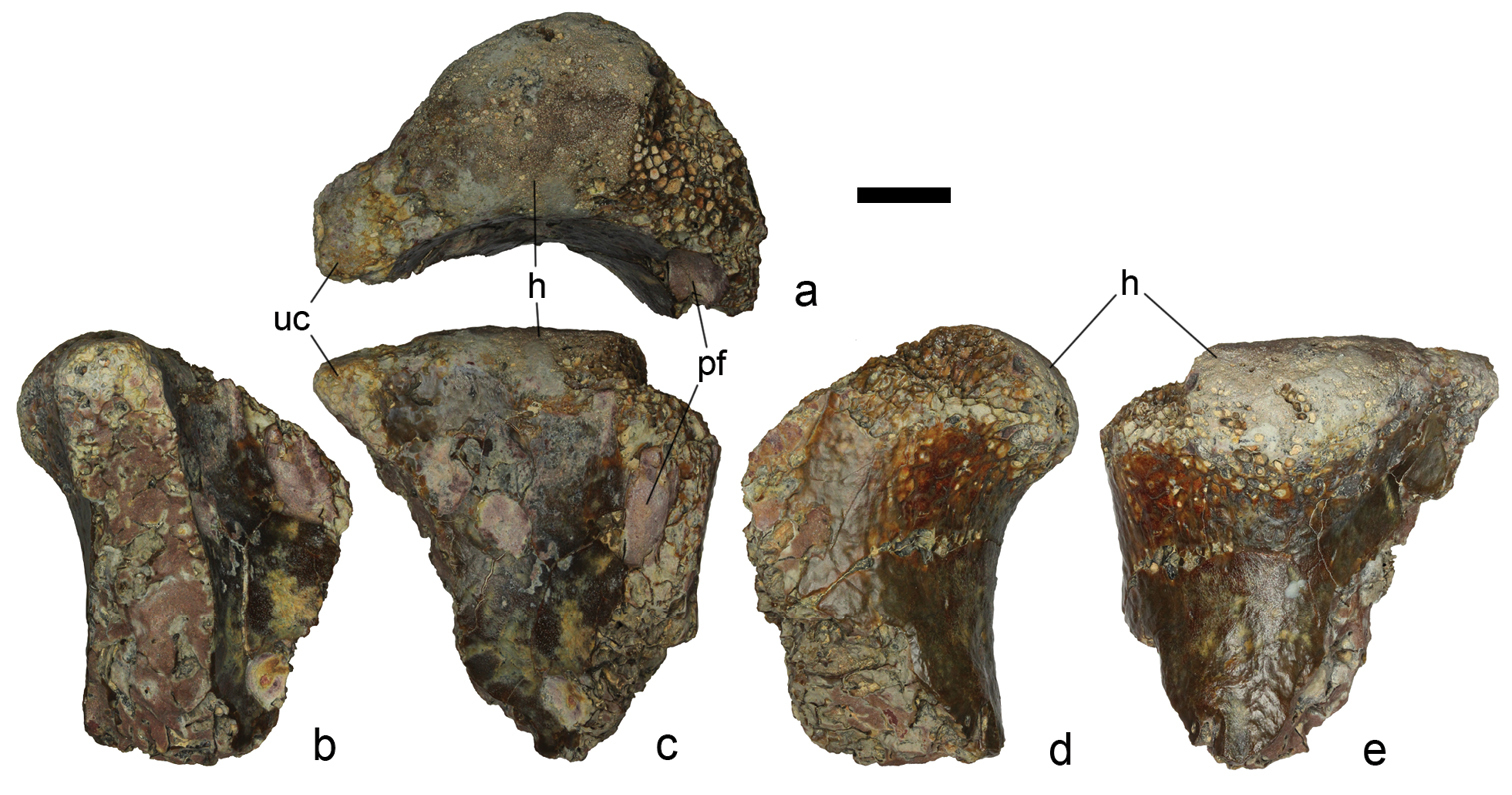
- Fragment of a left humerus viewed from various angles

Scientific classification
- Kingdom: Animalia
- Phylum: Chordata
- Class: Reptilia
- Order: †Pterosauria
- Suborder: †Pterodactyloidea
- Clade: †Azhdarchoidea
- Family: †Azhdarchidae
- Genus: †Aralazhdarcho; Averianov, 2007
- Species: †A. bostobensis

Binomial name
- †Aralazhdarcho bostobensis Averianov, 2007

Synonyms
- Samrukia? Naish et al., 2012

= Aralazhdarcho =

Aralazhdarcho Temporal range: Santonian–Campanian

Genus of azhdarchid pterosaur from the Late Cretaceous

Aralazhdarcho is a genus of azhdarchid pterosaur that lived during the Santonian to the early Campanian ages of the Late Cretaceous period in what is now Kazakhstan. The type and only known species is Aralazhdarcho bostobensis, named and described by Russian paleontologist Alexander Averianov. Its remains were found in the Bostobe Formation of Kazakhstan. The generic name combines the Aral Sea and the related genus Azhdarcho, while the specific name refers to its origin from the Bostobe Formation.

Due to its toothless anatomy and the geological age of its fossil remains, Aralazhdarcho was assigned to the family Azhdarchidae. Phylogenetic analyses would often recover it in a clade alongside Phosphatodraco from Morocco. The pterosaur genus Samrukia has been speculated to be a junior synonym of Aralazhdarcho.

== Etymology ==
Aralazhdarcho bostobensis as a genus and type species was named in 2007 by Russian paleontologist Alexander Averianov. However, the holotype specimen had already been described back in 2004. The generic name Aralazhdarcho is derived from the Aral Sea and the related genus Azhdarcho, while the specific name bostobensis refers to its provenance from the Bostobe Formation.

== Description ==
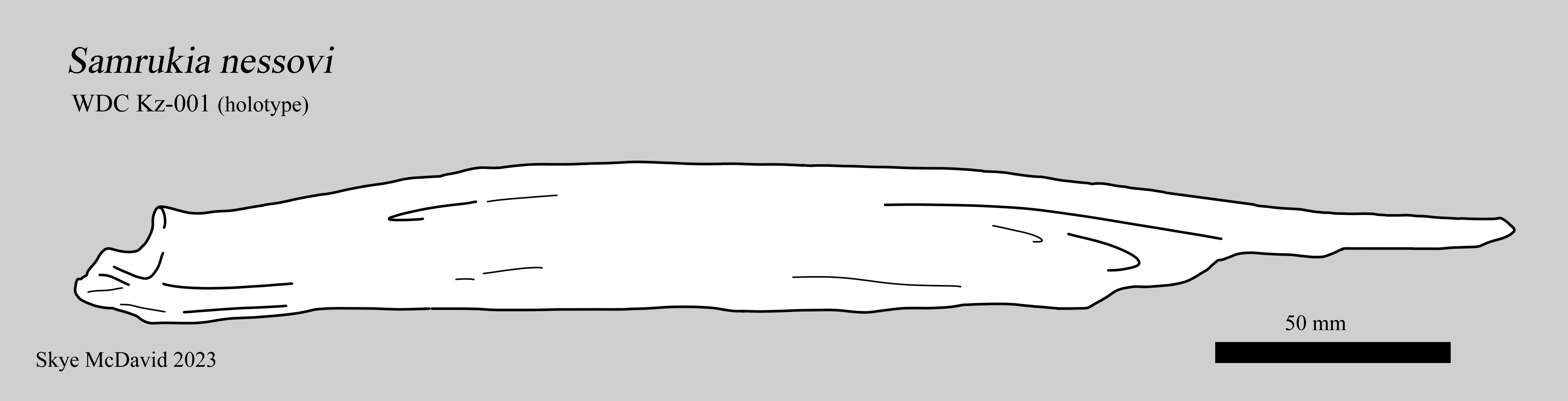
Illustration of the holotype of Samrukia, a possible junior synonym of Aralazhdarcho

Aralazhdarcho is based on holotype ZIN PH, no. 9/43, consisting of the anterior end of a neck vertebra, probably the fifth or sixth. Several paratypes have also been referred: a jugal, a toothless lower jaw fragment, centra from vertebrae, the distal end of a scapula, the proximal end of a second phalanx of the left wing finger and the proximal end of a left femur, of which, however, the head has broken off. The remains were found at the Shakh-Shakh locality of Kazakhstan. The species Samrukia nessovi, described separately from a partial lower jaw from the same formation, may have possibly been a junior synonym of Aralazhdarcho.

== Classification ==
In its description by Averianov, Aralazhdarcho was assigned to the family Azhdarchidae, in view of its lack of teeth and geological age. Averianov presumed that it presented a more southern form of azhdarchid as opposed to the contemporary genus Bogolubovia (now assigned as a pteranodontid instead of an azhdarchid), which was found more northern regions of Kazakhstan. The cladograms below show two different phylogenetic analyses that have recovered Aralazhdarcho within Azhdarchidae. The first one is by American paleontologist Brian Andres, in which he found Aralazhdarcho within the subfamily Quetzalcoatlinae, in a basal (primitive) clade with Phosphatodraco from Morocco. This close relationship between both azhdarchids would later be demonstrated again in a 2023 study by paleontologist Rubi Pêgas and colleagues, finding them in a trichotomy with Wellnhopterus from Texas. However, contrary to Andres in 2021, Pêgas and colleagues recovered Aralazhdarcho outside Quetzalcoatlinae in a more basal position within Azhdarchidae.

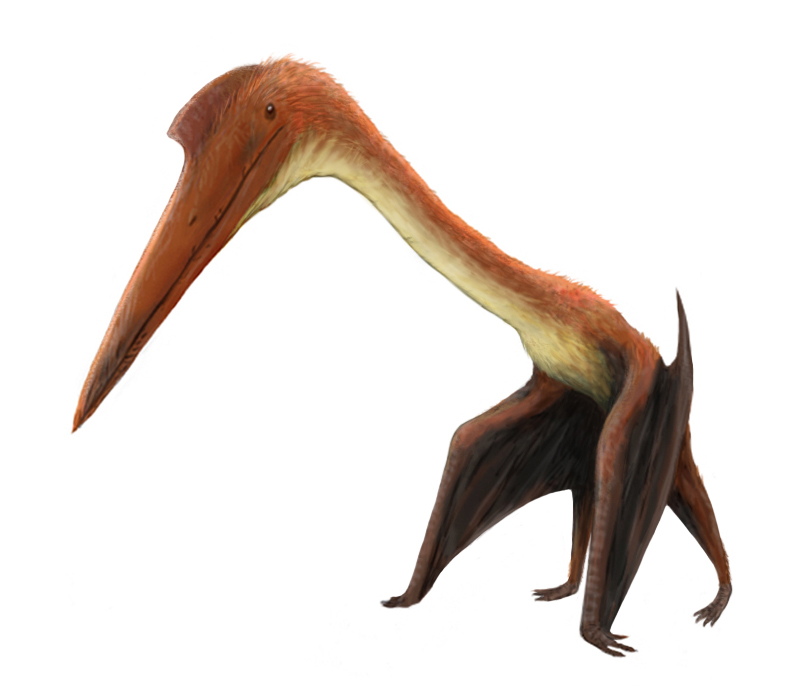
Life restoration of the azhdarchid Phosphatodraco, recovered as the sister taxon of Aralazhdarcho in many studies

Cladogram by Andres (2021).

- Azhdarchidae
  - Azhdarchinae
    - Azhdarcho lancicollis
    - - Albadraco tharmisensis
      - - Aerotitan sudamericanus
        - Mistralazhdarcho maggii
  - Quetzalcoatlinae
    - - Aralazhdarcho bostobensis
      - Phosphatodraco mauritanicus
    - - Eurazhdarcho langendorfensis
      - - Zhejiangopterus linhaiensis
        - - Wellnhopterus brevirostris
          - Cryodrakon boreas
          - - Hatzegopteryx thambema
            - - Arambourgiania philadelphiae
              - - Quetzalcoatlus lawsoni
                - Quetzalcoatlus northropi

Cladogram by Pêgas and colleagues (2023).

- Azhdarchidae
  - - Eurazhdarcho langendorfensis
    - - Phosphatodraco mauritanicus
      - Wellnhopterus brevirostris
      - Aralazhdarcho bostobensis
  - - Zhejiangopterus linhaiensis
    - - Azhdarcho lancicollis
      - Quetzalcoatlinae
        - Cryodrakon boreas
        - - - Hatzegopteryx thambema
            - Albadraco tharmisensis
          - - - Quetzalcoatlus northropi
              - Quetzalcoatlus lawsoni
              - Quetzalcoatlus sp. (FSAC-OB 14)
            - - Mistralazhdarcho maggii
              - Aerotitan sudamericanus
              - Arambourgiania philadelphiae

== See also ==
- Timeline of pterosaur research
- List of pterosaurs
