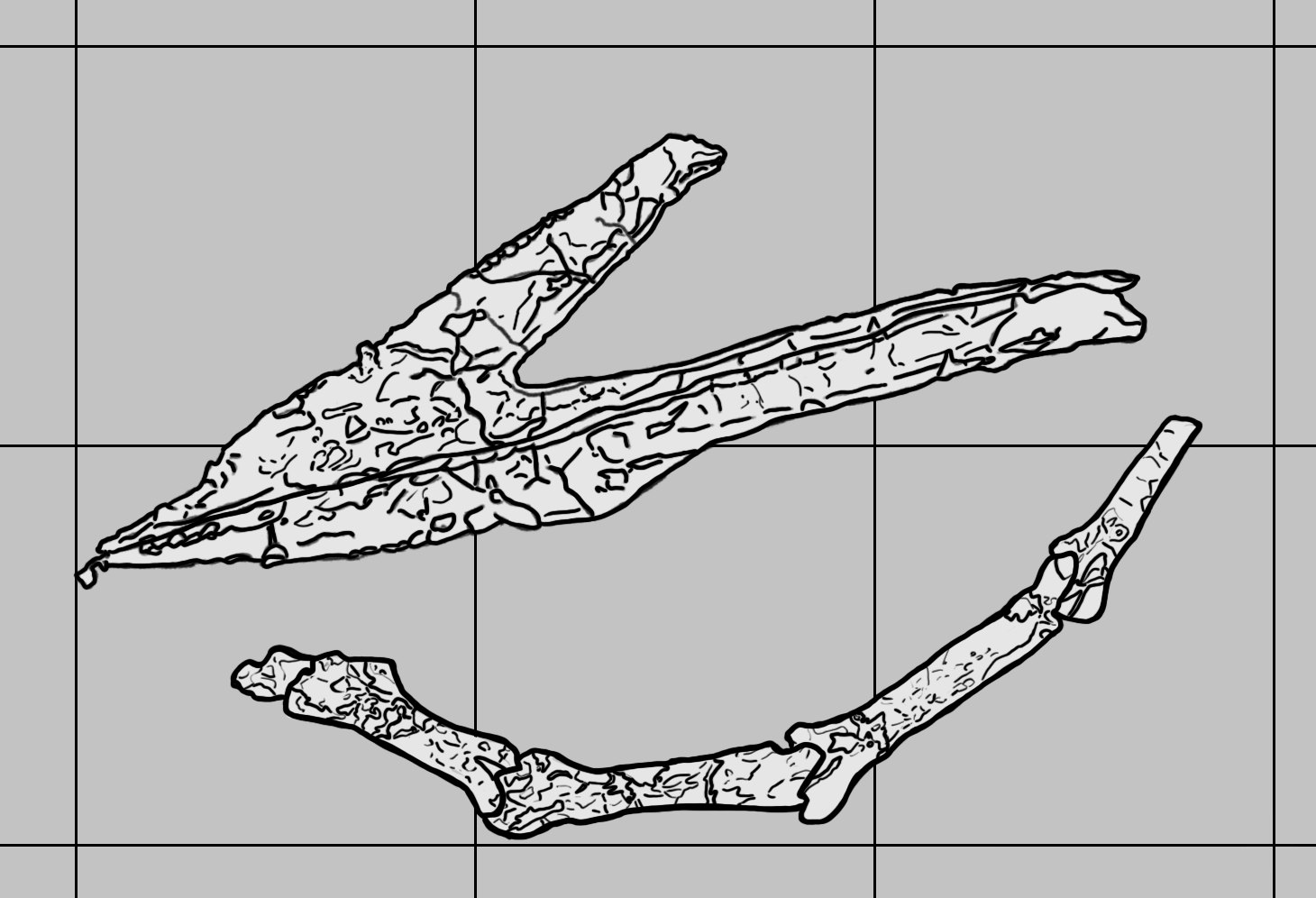
- Illustration of specimen TxVP 42489-2, the holotype

Scientific classification
- Kingdom: Animalia
- Phylum: Chordata
- Class: Reptilia
- Order: †Pterosauria
- Suborder: †Pterodactyloidea
- Clade: †Azhdarchoidea
- Family: †Azhdarchidae
- Genus: †Wellnhopterus; Andres & Langston Jr., 2021
- Species: †W. brevirostris

Binomial name
- †Wellnhopterus brevirostris Andres & Langston Jr., 2021

Synonyms
- Javelinadactylus sagebieli Campos, 2021

= Wellnhopterus =

Wellnhopterus Temporal range: Late Cretaceous (Maastrichtian), 68–66 Ma

Genus of azhdarchid pterosaur from the Late Cretaceous

Wellnhopterus is a genus of azhdarchid pterosaur that lived during the Maastrichtian age of the Late Cretaceous period in what is now Texas, United States. Its fossil remains were discovered in the Javelina Formation at Big Bend National Park, located in Brewster County, Texas. The fossils consist of a set of upper and lower jaws, several cervical (neck) vertebrae, and a fragmentary long bone. Originally referred to an indeterminate species of Quetzalcoatlus, these remains would receive various interpretations ranging from a tapejarid to an azhdarchid identity. It was not until December 2021 that they were given a new genus and type species, Wellnhopterus brevirostris, named and described by paleontologists Brian Andres and, posthumously, Wann Langston Jr.. Its generic name means "Wellnhofer's wing", named in honor of paleontologist Peter Wellnhofer, while its specific name means "short-beaked", attributing to the blunt structure of its jaws.

Back in July 2021, the jaw remains of Wellnhopterus had actually been given a separate genus and type species, "Javelinadactylus sagebieli", named and described by paleontologist Hebert Campos. He assigned it to the group Thalassodrominae. The article describing it, however, has now been retracted due to Campos lacking ownership of the reported data and because Andres had submitted his paper describing Wellnhopterus earlier than he did. As of the present day, Wellnhopterus brevirostris is the formal name of this pterosaur.

In its description, Andres and Langston Jr. estimated a wingspan of about 3 m (9 ft 10 in), making it a mid-sized pterosaur. It is comparable to the wingspan estimate of the contemporary species Quetzalcoatlus lawsoni, which sits at about 4.5 m (15 ft). The blunt structure of the snout, coupled with the more robustly-built and shorter neck of Wellnhopterus is quite different from the contemporary azhdarchid Quetzalcoatlus, which had more slender jaws and a longer neck. This anatomy of Wellnhopterus has been compared to other "blunt-jawed" azhdarchids, such as Hatzegopteryx, which are more adapted to hunt proportionally large prey in a raptorial manner. Wellnhopterus has been assigned to the family Azhdarchidae, but its position within the group has been somewhat disputed. Its describers placed it within the subfamily Quetzalcoatlinae, but other studies have recovered it in a more basal position outside Quetzalcoatlinae.

== Discovery and history ==
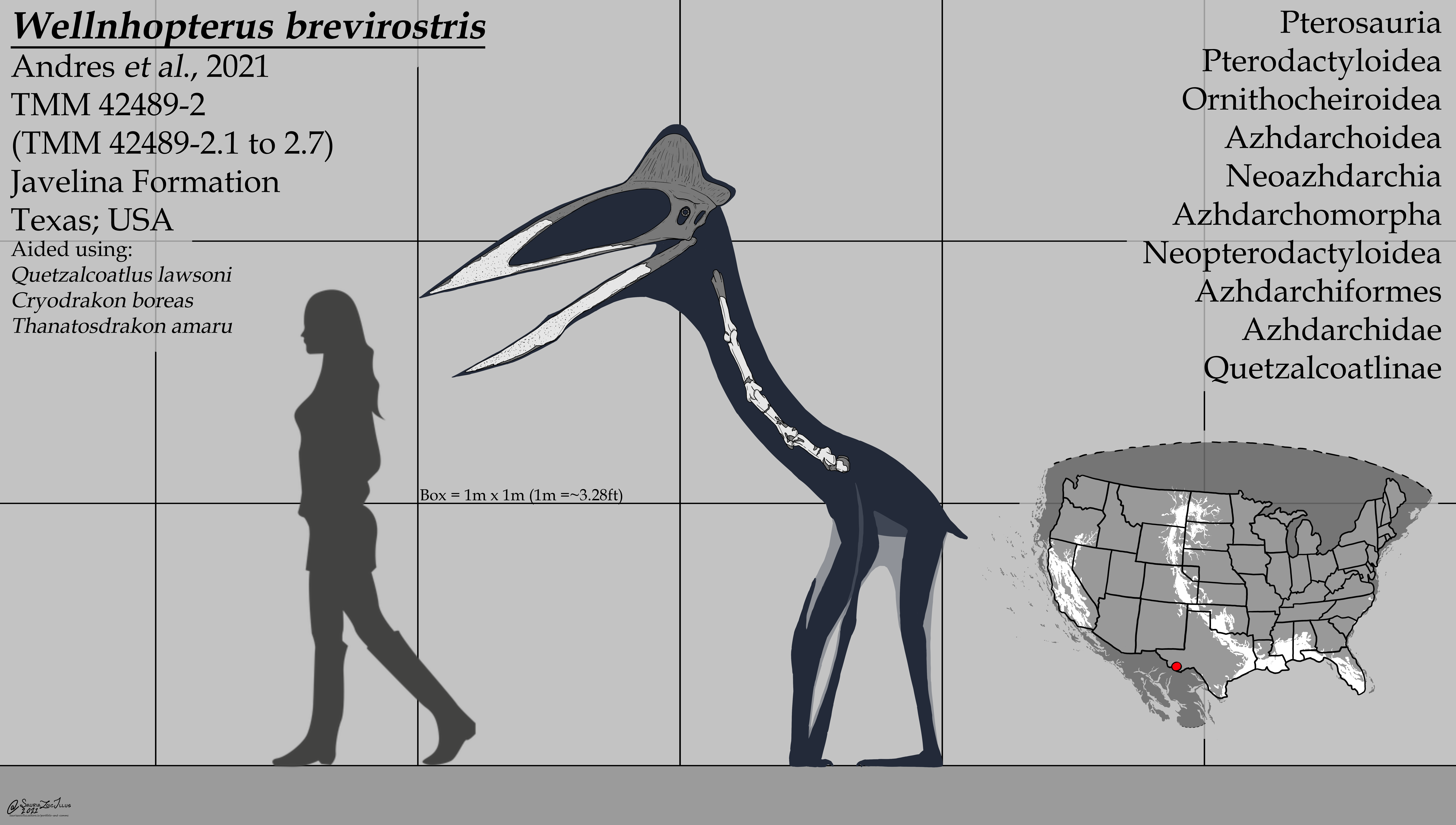
Size chart of specimen TxVP 42489-2 reconstructed as an azhdarchid, including the jaws and neck vertebrae

In March 1986, the remains of jaws and cervical (neck) vertebrae of a large pterosaur were discovered in the Javelina Formation at Big Bend National Park in Brewster County, western Texas, by preparator Robert Rainey. In 1991, German paleontologist Peter Wellnhofer illustrated the find by a picture in his book The Illustrated Encyclopedia of Pterosaurs. In the photo caption, Wellnhofer assigned it to Quetzalcoatlus sp., indicating an indeterminate species of said pterosaur. Accordingly, his illustrator John Sibbick reconstructed Quetzalcoatlus itself with a snout that was too blunt, a mistake repeated in many popular science works. In 1996, paleontologists Alexander Kellner and Wann Langston Jr. pointed out that the remains dated from older layers than those which had produced Quetzalcoatlus sp. and that it represented a pterosaur with a shorter snout and neck. In 2004, Kellner, limiting himself to the skull material which he reconstructed, stated that it was a member of the family Tapejaridae. In 2006, British paleontologists David Martill and Darren Naish concluded that the snout resembled that of Tupuxuara more than that of Quetzalcoatlus and referred to the taxon as the "Javelina Tupuxuara". However, the fossils were studied in 2013 by American paleontologist Brian Andres, whose cladistic analysis recovered the taxon as a member of the family Azhdarchidae, both when the cervical vertebrae were included and when only the skull material was entered in the analysis. In the same year, British paleontologist Mark Witton similarly favored an azhdarchid interpretation over a thalassodromid one such as Tupuxuara, comparing it to other azhdarchids that had blunt jaws.

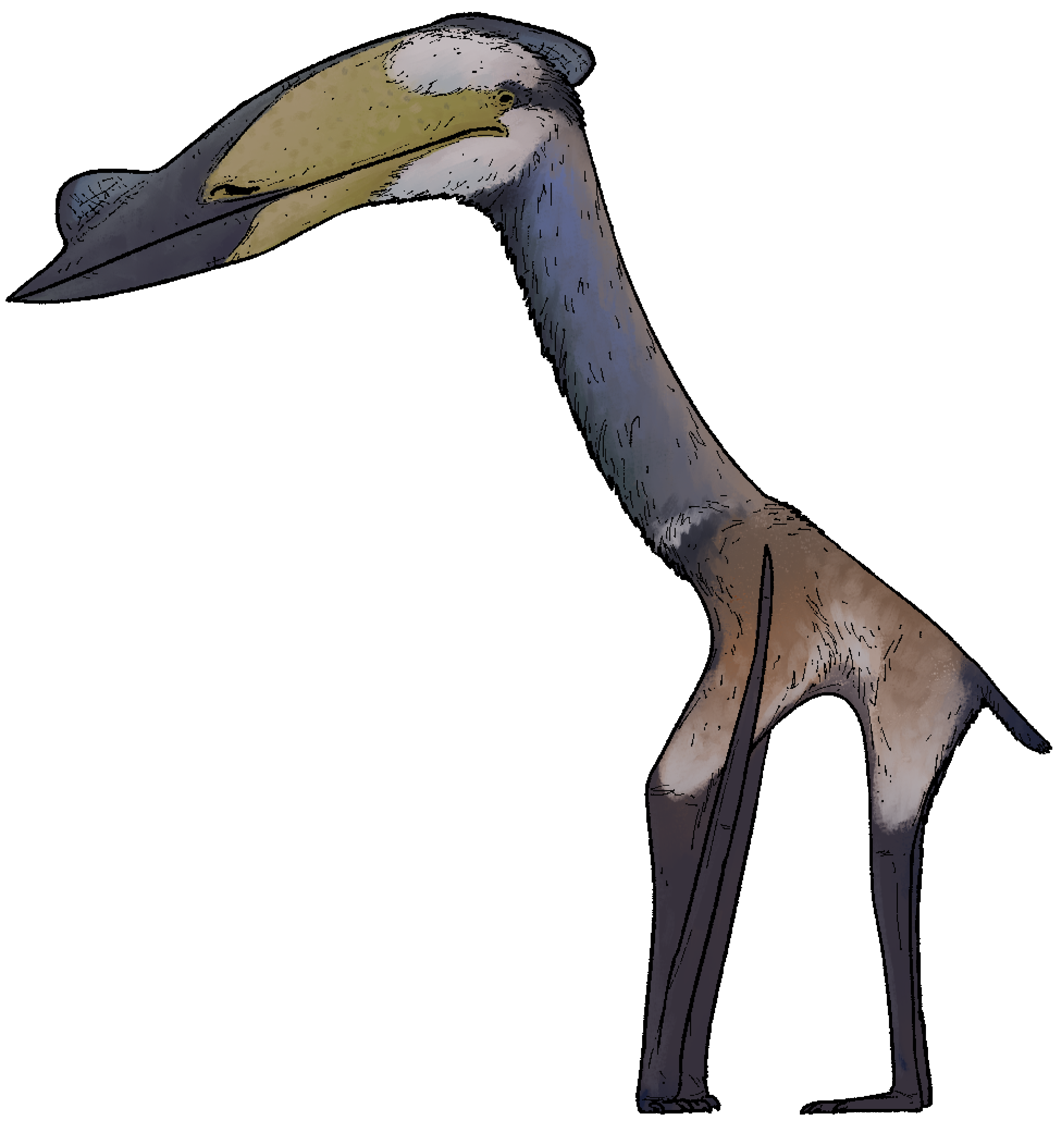
Life reconstruction of Wellnhopterus brevirostris with speculative beak crest

The known fossil remains of Wellnhopterus consist of specimen TxVP 42489-2, which is a set of upper and lower jaws, specimens TxVP 42489-2.3 to 42489-2.8, which are several cervical vertebrae, and specimen TxVP 42489-2.9, which is a fragmentary long bone. The layer of the Javelina Formation where they were found dated back to the Maastrichtian of the Late Cretaceous. The complete specimen, including the jaws and the cervical vertebrae, were given the new genus and type species Wellnhopterus brevirostris in December 2021. It was named and described by Andres and, posthumously, Langston Jr. The generic name Wellnhopterus honors Wellnhofer by combining his name with the Greek word πτερόν (pteron, meaning "wing"), a typical suffix for pterosaur genera, and would translate as "Wellnhofer's wing". The specific name brevirostris is a combination of the Latin words brevis, meaning "short", and rostrum, meaning "beak", which references its description in the literature as a "short-faced animal". Specimen TxVP 42489-2 was made the holotype of Wellnhopterus and it includes the front of the paired (both left-side and right-side) premaxillae, the paired maxillae, the jugals, the front of the mandibular symphysis and the dentary branch. The remains had been partially articulated.

=== "Javelinadactylus" ===
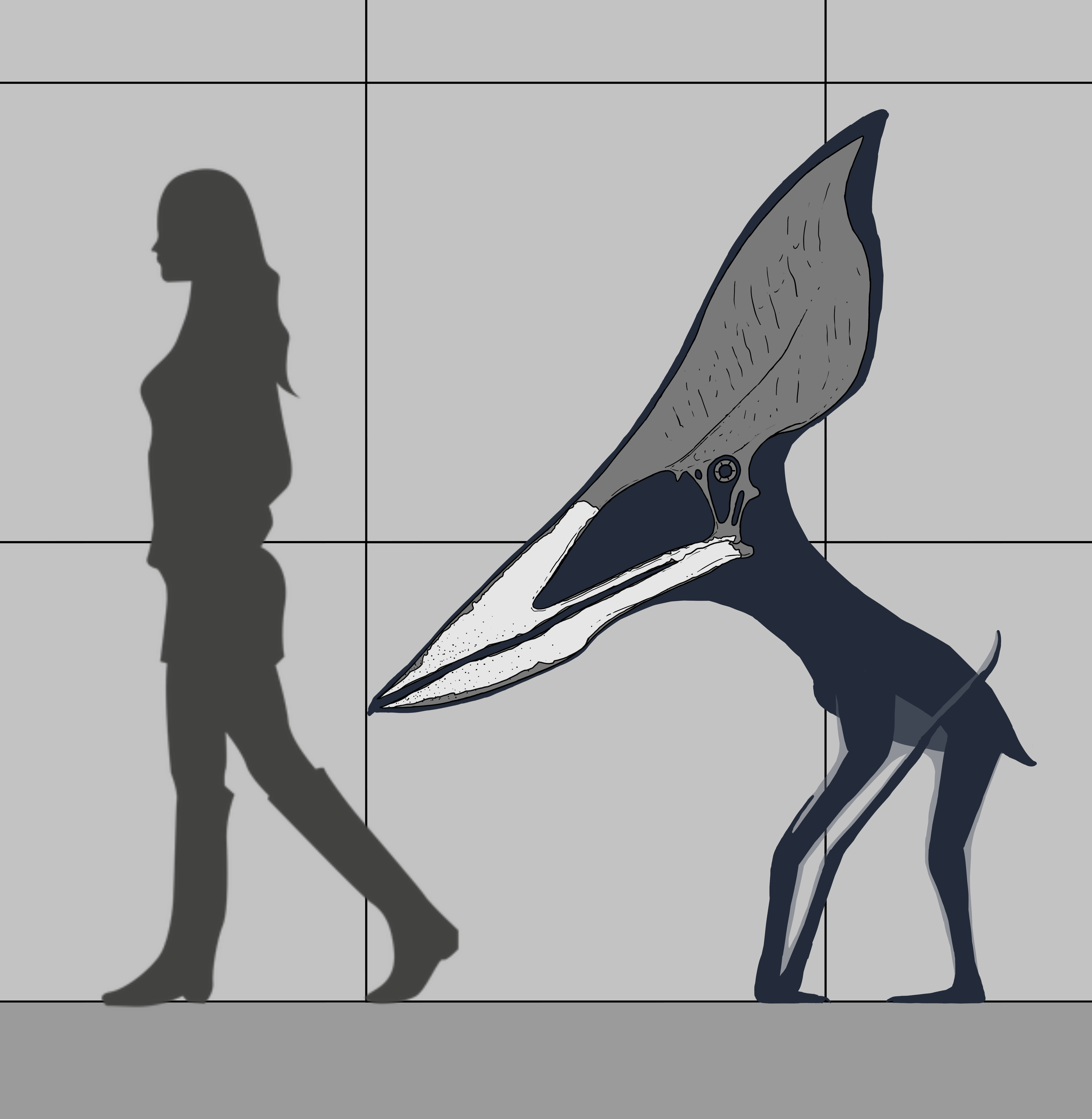
Size chart of specimen TxVP 42489-2 reconstructed as a thalassodromine

Back in July 2021, the genus and type species "Javelinadactylus sagebieli" had been named and described by Brazilian paleontologist Hebert Campos based only on specimen TxVP 42489-2. The neck vertebrae (specimens TxVP 42489-2.3 to 2.7) were not considered to be part of the holotype in this paper. The generic name Javelinadactylus is a combination of the Javelina Formation, in reference to its origin there, with the Ancient Greek word δάκτυλος (daktylos, meaning "finger"), a usual suffix in the names of pterosaurs. The specific name sagebieli honors James Sagebiel, head of the vertebrate fossils collection of the University of Texas. It was the second pterosaur species named from the latest Cretaceous of Texas, after Quetzalcoatlus. Campos had assigned it to the subfamily Thalassodrominae within Tapejaridae, which would make "Javelinadactylus" the first known tapejarid from North America and would extend the range of the group to the Maastrichtian. However, in July 2022, Campos' paper was retracted due to the following reasons:

"The editors have retracted this article, because the author did not have the ownership of the data reported. This was confirmed by the University of Texas at Austin. In addition, this article described a new species that was based on photographs of specimen TxVP 42489-2. This specimen has been described and named, as Wellnhopterus brevirostris, gen. et sp. nov., in a different article that was submitted for publication prior to the submission of this article, and itself was part of a larger study. Hebert Bruno Nascimento Campos agrees to this retraction. The online version of this article contains the full text of the retracted article as Supplementary Information."

== Description ==
Size of Wellnhopterus (middle bottom) compared to contemporary pterosaurs, birds, and a human. Quetzalcoatlus northropi (lower left) and Q. lawsoni (above Wellnhopterus) are also depicted

In its description by Andres and Langston Jr., Wellnhopterus was given an estimated wingspan of about 3 m (9 ft 10 in), much smaller than that of the contemporary species Quetzalcoatlus northropi, which had an estimated wingspan of around 10 to 11 m (33 to 36 ft). However, the wingspan of Wellnhopterus is comparable to another contemporary species of Quetzalcoatlus, Q. lawsoni, which had estimated wingspan of around 4.5 m (15 ft). With regards to the structure of its snout, Wellnhopterus has a well-defined bluntness in its jaws and a stockier and shorter neck, which is very different from the slender-jawed and longer-necked structure of its coeval Quetzalcoatlus. Due to these features, Wellnhopterus has been compared to other "blunt-jawed" members of the Azhdarchidae (the family to which Wellnhopterus belongs), which have a more robustly-built but shorter neck and thicker jaws. One such example is Hatzegopteryx from Romania.

== Classification ==
In its description in 2021 by Andres and Langston Jr., Wellnhopterus was recovered as a member of the family Azhdarchidae. In the same year, Andres performed a phylogenetic analysis in which he recovered Wellnhopterus in the subfamily Quetzalcoatlinae within Azhdarchidae. Wellnhopterus was more specifically found in a trichotomy with Cryodrakon and a clade consisting of Hatzegopteryx, Arambourgiania, and Quetzalcoatlus. The first cladogram below shows the results of his study. In 2023, paleontologist Rubi Pêgas and colleagues performed their own phylogenetic analysis and recovered Wellnhopterus in a much more different position than Andres in 2021. Within Azhdarchidae, it formed a trichotomy with both Phosphatodraco and Aralazhdarcho. This clade, which was joined by Eurazhdarcho, was recovered outside Quetzalcoatlinae in a more basal (primitive) position. The second cladogram below shows the results of their analysis.

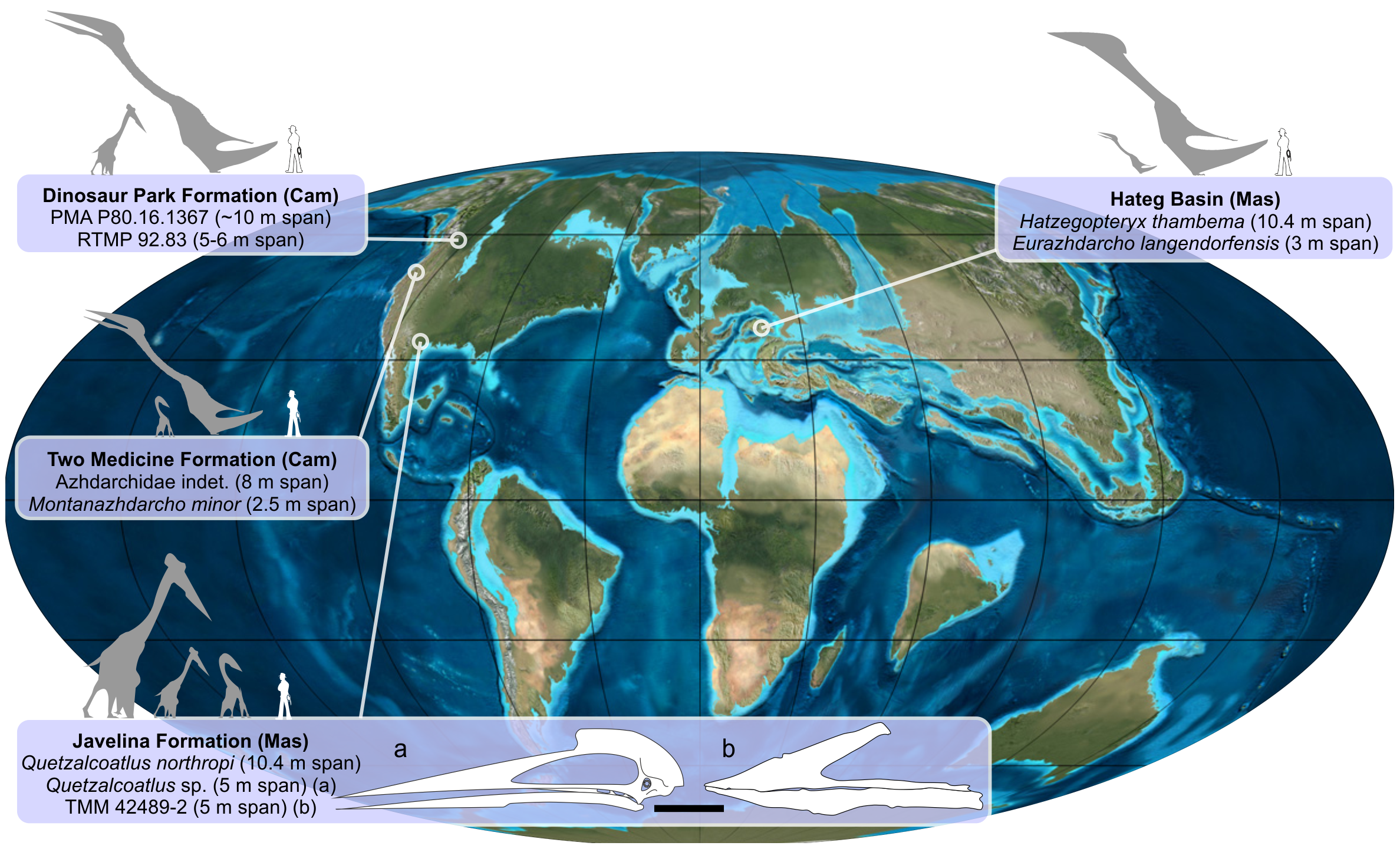
Map showing global distribution of faunas containing small-medium and giant-sized azhdarchids, with Wellnhopterus (TxVP 42489-2; lower left) alongside Quetzalcoatlus

Topology 1: Andres (2021).

- Azhdarchidae
  - Azhdarchinae
    - Azhdarcho lancicollis
    - - Albadraco tharmisensis
      - - Aerotitan sudamericanus
        - Mistralazhdarcho maggii
  - Quetzalcoatlinae
    - - Aralazhdarcho bostobensis
      - Phosphatodraco mauritanicus
    - - Eurazhdarcho langendorfensis
      - - Zhejiangopterus linhaiensis
        - - Wellnhopterus brevirostris
          - Cryodrakon boreas
          - - Hatzegopteryx thambema
            - - Arambourgiania philadelphiae
              - - Quetzalcoatlus lawsoni
                - Quetzalcoatlus northropi

Topology 2: Pêgas and colleagues (2023).

- Azhdarchidae
  - - Eurazhdarcho langendorfensis
    - - Phosphatodraco mauritanicus
      - Wellnhopterus brevirostris
      - Aralazhdarcho bostobensis
  - - Zhejiangopterus linhaiensis
    - - Azhdarcho lancicollis
      - Quetzalcoatlinae
        - Cryodrakon boreas
        - - - Hatzegopteryx thambema
            - Albadraco tharmisensis
          - - - Quetzalcoatlus northropi
              - Quetzalcoatlus lawsoni
              - Quetzalcoatlus sp. (FSAC-OB 14)
            - - Mistralazhdarcho maggii
              - Aerotitan sudamericanus
              - Arambourgiania philadelphiae

== Paleobiology ==
Wellnhopterus was likely raptorial, as "blunt-jawed" azhdarchids are thought to have been specialized to hunt proportionally large prey. Its co-existence with the much larger Quetzalcoatlus and a possible additional pterosaur taxon in the Javelina Formation have been used as examples of pterosaur diversity being higher in the Maastrichtian than traditionally thought.
