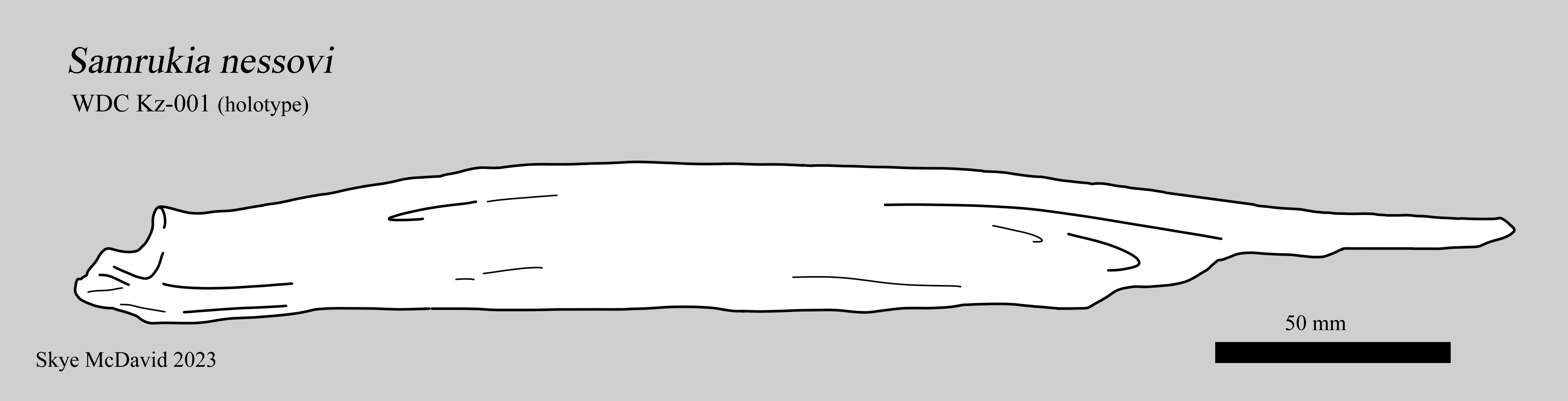
- Illustration of the holotype.

Scientific classification
- Kingdom: Animalia
- Phylum: Chordata
- Class: Reptilia
- Order: †Pterosauria
- Suborder: †Pterodactyloidea
- Genus: †Samrukia; Naish et al., 2012
- Species: †S. nessovi

Binomial name
- †Samrukia nessovi Naish et al., 2012

Synonyms
- Aralazhdarcho? Averianov, 2007

= Samrukia =

Samrukia Temporal range: Late Cretaceous, 84 Ma

Genus of pterodactyloid pterosaur from the Late Cretaceous

Samrukia is a genus of large Cretaceous pterosaurs known only from a single lower jaw discovered in Kazakhstan. The holotype and only known specimen was collected from the Santonian-Campanian age Bostobynskaya Formation in Kyzylorda District. It was described by Darren Naish, Gareth Dyke, Andrea Cau, François Escuillié, and Pascal Godefroit in 2012, and the type species is named Samrukia nessovi. The species is named after Lev Nessov, a paleontologist, and the genus is named after Samruk, a magical bird of Kazakh folklore.

== Classification ==
The type specimen of Samrukia was at first believed to belong to an oviraptorosaurian theropod dinosaur. An initial cladistic analysis by Naish et al. found Samrukia nessovi instead to be a basal member of the bird lineage Ornithuromorpha. They interpreted Samrukia as a very large bird (the jawbone is twice as long as that of an ostrich), but noted that it is not known whether Samrukia would have been able to fly (in which case they would have had wingspans of roughly 4 m (13 ft)) or not (in which case they would have been around 2–3 m (6.6–9.8 ft) tall).

A subsequent analysis published by Eric Buffetaut in 2011 challenged the interpretation of Samrukia nessovi as a bird. Buffetaut challenged the identification of certain "avian" characteristics identified by Naish et al., claiming that none were definitely avian and that many were in fact well known among pterosaurs. He noted that all purported autapomorphies of Samrukia, the unique traits used to set it apart from other birds, are shared with pterosaurs. He also criticized the earlier cladistic analysis for not including pterosaurs, but only birds and other theropod dinosaurs. Buffetaut stated that the species is "clearly a large pterosaur, not a giant bird."

One of the original researchers who described Samrukia, Darren Naish, agreed with Buffetaut's re-assessment. Naish wrote on his Scientific American Web log Tetrapod Zoology: "Working on fragmentary material is dangerous since you can often get things very, very wrong, and I realised within a few days of the paper appearing that Samrukia was no bird. It seemed, in fact, to be a pterosaur."

A subsequent review by Averianov et al. agreed with the reidentification of the specimen as a pterosaur, and suggested it was an Azhdarchid, possibly a synonym of Aralazhdarcho, which is known from the same formation.
