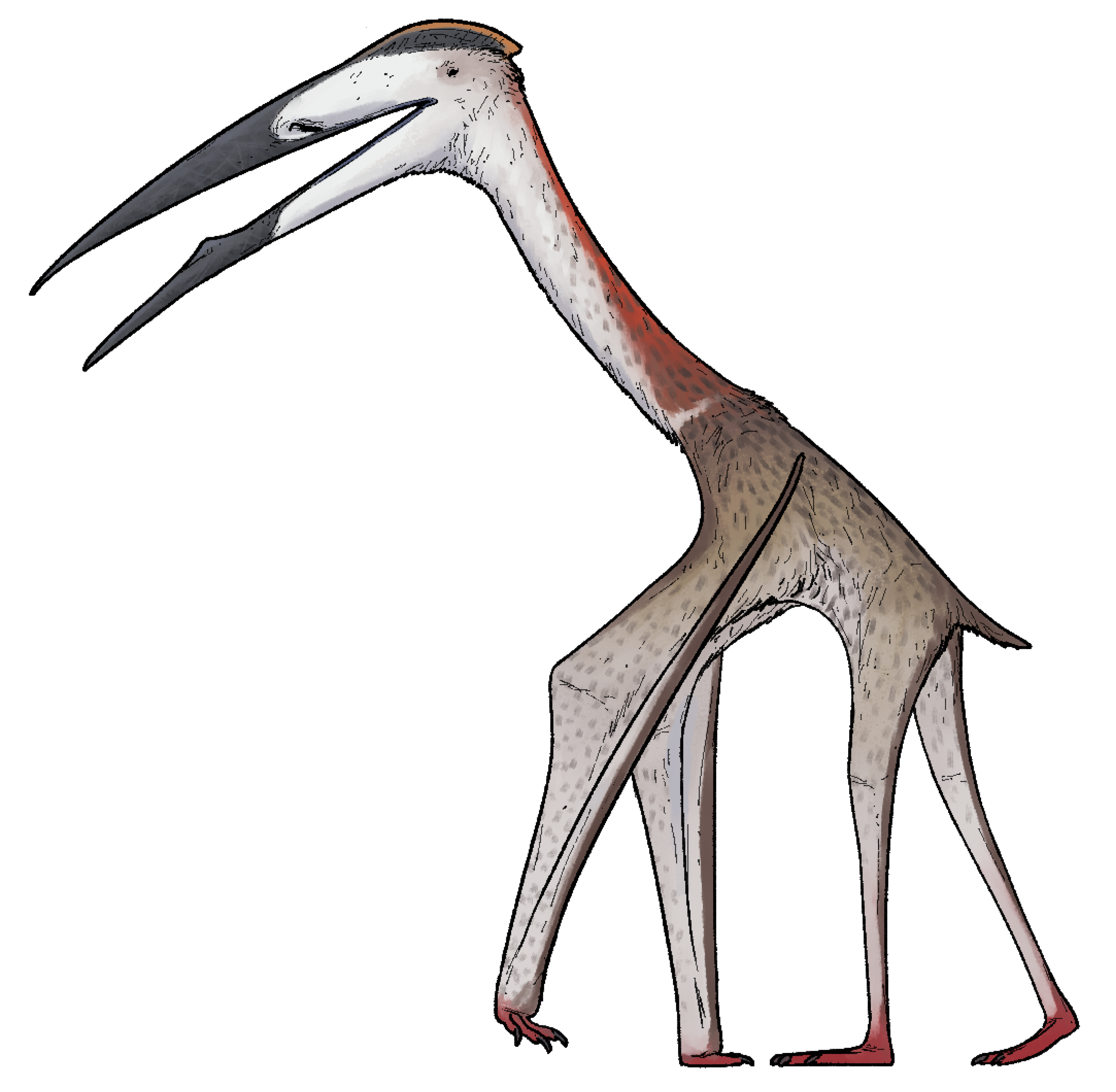
- Hypothetical life restoration

Scientific classification
- Kingdom: Animalia
- Phylum: Chordata
- Class: Reptilia
- Order: †Pterosauria
- Suborder: †Pterodactyloidea
- Clade: †Azhdarchoidea
- Family: †Azhdarchidae
- Genus: †Mistralazhdarcho; Vullo et al., 2018
- Species: †M. maggii

Binomial name
- †Mistralazhdarcho maggii Vullo et al., 2018

= Mistralazhdarcho =

Mistralazhdarcho Temporal range: Campanian to Maastrichtian, 74–71.6 Ma

Genus of azhdarchid pterosaur from the Late Cretaceous

Mistralazhdarcho is a genus of azhdarchid pterosaur that lived during the Campanian and Maastrichtian ages of the Late Cretaceous period in what is now France. A rich fossil site was discovered in 1992 by paleontologist Xavier Valentin at Velaux–La Bastide Neuve, in the south of France. Pterosaur fossil remains would be subsequently uncovered in the site. They were found in a layer of the Aix-en-Provence Basin at Velaux–La Bastide Neuve and consist of a partial skeleton that includes part of the mandible. These remains would later be made the holotype specimen of the new genus and type species Mistralazhdarcho maggii, named and described in 2018 by Valentin, along with paleontologists Romain Vullo, Géraldine Garcia, Pascal Godefroit, and Aude Cincotta. The generic name combines the mistral, a typical northern wind from the area, and the related genus Azhdarcho. The specific name honors Jean-Pierre Maggi, the mayor of Velaux, who supported the La Bastide Neuve paleontological project.

Based on extrapolations of the size of its humerus and the wingspan of the related pterosaur Zhejiangopterus, the estimated wingspan for the holotype specimen of Mistralazhdarcho sits between 4.24 and 4.85 m (13.9 and 15.9 ft). However, the holotype is not fully grown. Wingspans of adult individuals are estimated to have measured between 5 and 6 m (16 and 20 ft). By comparing its fossil remains to those of its relatives, Mistralazhdarcho seems to have shared the most features with the genus Aerotitan from Argentina.

Mistralazhdarcho was assigned to the family Azhdarchidae by Vullo and colleagues, though a cladistic analysis was not made in its description. Later studies would include Mistralazhdarcho in their phylogenetic analyses, but its placement varies depending on the study. Within Azhdarchidae, some have recovered Mistralazhdarcho in the subfamily Azhdarchinae, while others in Quetzalcoatlinae. However, its position as the sister taxon of Aerotitan has always been consistent. Because of its size, Mistralazhdarcho most likely represents a mid-sized class of European azhdarchid, its contemporary relatives in Europe were either small or gigantic.

== Discovery and naming ==
In 1992, a rich fossil site was discovered by French paleontologist Xavier Valentin at Velaux–La Bastide Neuve, in the south of France. Between 2009 and 2012, pterosaur remains were excavated in the site. They were subsequently reported in the scientific literature in 2015 by paleontologist Aude Cincotta and colleagues, along with numerous other non-pterosaur fossil remains.

Among the pterosaur remains is specimen MMS/VBN.09.C.001, which was discovered in a sandstone layer of the Aix-en-Provence Basin at Velaux–La Bastide Neuve. The layer dates back to the late Campanian, about 72 million years ago. Specimen MMS/VBN.09.C.001 consists of a partial skeleton with part of the mandible. It contains the symphysis of the lower jaws (the part where they join), the atlas-axis complex of the front neck, a middle neck vertebra, the left humerus, a piece of the right humerus, the left radius, the right pteroid, the shaft of the fourth metacarpal, the proximal part of the first phalanx of the wing finger, the distal part of the same phalanx, and four bone fragments that could not be identified, which include some articular surface and two shafts. The skeleton was not found articulated but the bones were discovered on a limited surface of 5 m^{2} (54 ft^{2}) within the total surface of 140 m^{2} (1,500 ft^{2}) formed by the fossil layer. Therefore, it was concluded they represent a single individual, probably a subadult.

In 2018, specimen MMS/VBN.09.C.001 was made the holotype of the newly named genus and type species Mistralazhdarcho maggii, named and described by Valentin, along with paleontologists Romain Vullo, Géraldine Garcia, Pascal Godefroit, and Aude Cincotta. The generic name Mistralazhdarcho is a combination of the mistral, a northern wind typical of the area of discovery, and the related pterosaur Azhdarcho, the type genus of Azhdarchidae, the family to which Mistralazhdarcho belongs. The specific name maggii honors Jean-Pierre Maggi, the mayor of Velaux, for his support of the La Bastide Neuve paleontological project.

== Description ==
Mistralazhdarcho is a large pterosaur. The humerus was estimated to have had an original length of 19 cm (7.5 in). Knowing this measurement, there are a few methods that can be used in order to estimate its wingspan. One such method involves using a formula devised by Russian paleontologist Alexander Averianov. This would indicate a wingspan of about 4.24 m (13.9 ft) for Mistralazhdarcho. Another possible method is to extrapolate the wingspan from the known skeleton of the azhdarchid Zhejiangopterus, which is more complete. This would result in a wingspan estimate of 4.85 m (15.9 ft). Both estimates seem to corroborate the hypothesis that the holotype individual of Mistralazhdarcho had a wingspan of about 4.5 m (15 ft). However, said holotype was not yet fully grown. An adult exemplar could have had an estimated wingspan measuring around 5 to 6 m (16 to 20 ft).

In its description, Vullo and colleagues indicated some distinguishing traits of Mistralazhdarcho. One of these was an autapomorphy, a unique derived character. The upper surface of the symphysis of the lower jaws shows a well-developed elevation on the midline in a relatively forward position of 18 cm (7.1 in) behind the mandible tip, compared to 32 cm (1 ft 1 in) in the related pterosaur Alanqa. A second trait is also a possible autapomorphy, which is that the tip of the lower jaws is somewhat curved downwards. However, this trait would only be unique to Mistralazhdarcho if the related azhdarchid Aerotitan from Argentina does not have a curved tip itself. This latter pterosaur was originally described as not having one, but Vullo and colleagues, while studying Mistralazhdarcho, concluded that the original description of Aerotitan was likely mistaken and that its curved holotype did not represent the middle of the jaws but their front end.

Additionally, Vullo and colleagues gave a unique combination of traits that in themselves are not unique. The upper surface of the symphysis or fusion of the lower jaws shows elevated but blunt ridges on its edges. This symphysis has a V-shaped cross-section, thus lacking a lower crest. The underside of the atlas-axis complex of the neck is flat. In the middle neck vertebrae the front articulation processes, the prezygapophyses, lightly diverge. The humerus is relatively short compared to the radius, with 66% of its length.

In 2021, in a more thorough analysis of the already mentioned genus Aerotitan, paleontologist Rubi Pêgas and colleagues compared its holotype to those of other azhdarchids, where they concluded that, among them, Mistralazhdarcho shared that most common features, especially its mandibular tip.

== Classification ==
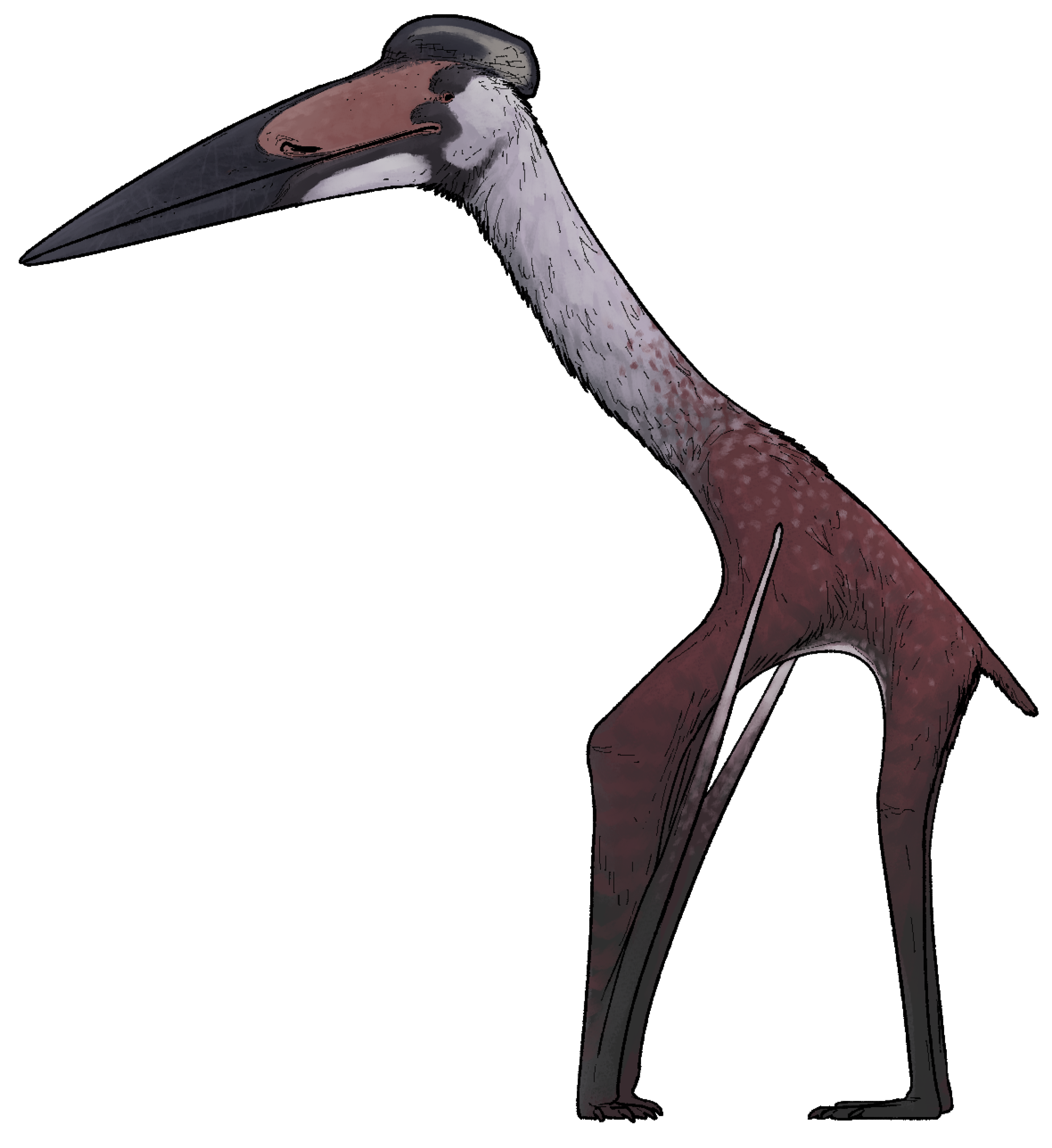
Life reconstruction of the related Aerotitan. This pterosaur shared the most features with Mistralazhdarcho

In its description in 2018, Mistralazhdarcho was placed in the family Azhdarchidae, without an exact cladistic analysis. The elevation on the symphysis shared with Alanqa suggests a close relationship between the two genera. However, later phylogenetic analyses do not corroborate their close relationship. For example, a 2021 study by American paleontologist Brian Andres recovered Mistralazhdarcho as the sister taxon of Aerotitan in the subfamily Azhdarchinae within Azhdarchidae, in the most derived (advanced) position. Alanqa in this analysis was not even recovered as an azhdarchid, but as a thalassodromid instead. The close relationship between Mistralazhdarcho and Aerotitan would later be demonstrated again in a phylogenetic analysis by Pêgas and colleagues in 2023, where they found both azhdarchids in a trichotomy with the genus Arambourgiania. However, unlike Andres in 2021, Pêgas and colleagues found them nested within the subfamily Quetzalcoatlinae.

Cladogram by Andres (2021).

- Azhdarchidae
  - Azhdarchinae
    - Azhdarcho lancicollis
    - - Albadraco tharmisensis
      - - Aerotitan sudamericanus
        - Mistralazhdarcho maggii
  - Quetzalcoatlinae
    - - Aralazhdarcho bostobensis
      - Phosphatodraco mauritanicus
    - - Eurazhdarcho langendorfensis
      - - Zhejiangopterus linhaiensis
        - - Wellnhopterus brevirostris
          - Cryodrakon boreas
          - - Hatzegopteryx thambema
            - - Arambourgiania philadelphiae
              - - Quetzalcoatlus lawsoni
                - Quetzalcoatlus northropi

Cladogram by Pêgas and colleagues (2023).

- Azhdarchidae
  - - Eurazhdarcho langendorfensis
    - - Phosphatodraco mauritanicus
      - Wellnhopterus brevirostris
      - Aralazhdarcho bostobensis
  - - Zhejiangopterus linhaiensis
    - - Azhdarcho lancicollis
      - Quetzalcoatlinae
        - Cryodrakon boreas
        - - - Hatzegopteryx thambema
            - Albadraco tharmisensis
          - - - Quetzalcoatlus northropi
              - Quetzalcoatlus lawsoni
              - Quetzalcoatlus sp. (FSAC-OB 14)
            - - Mistralazhdarcho maggii
              - Aerotitan sudamericanus
              - Arambourgiania philadelphiae

== Paleobiology ==
Mistralazhdarcho is the first pterosaur named from the Campanian to the Maastrichtian of Western Europe. Due to its size, Mistralazhdarcho possibly represents an intermediate size class of European azhdarchids, in between the smaller genus Eurazhdarcho and the giant form Hatzegopteryx.
