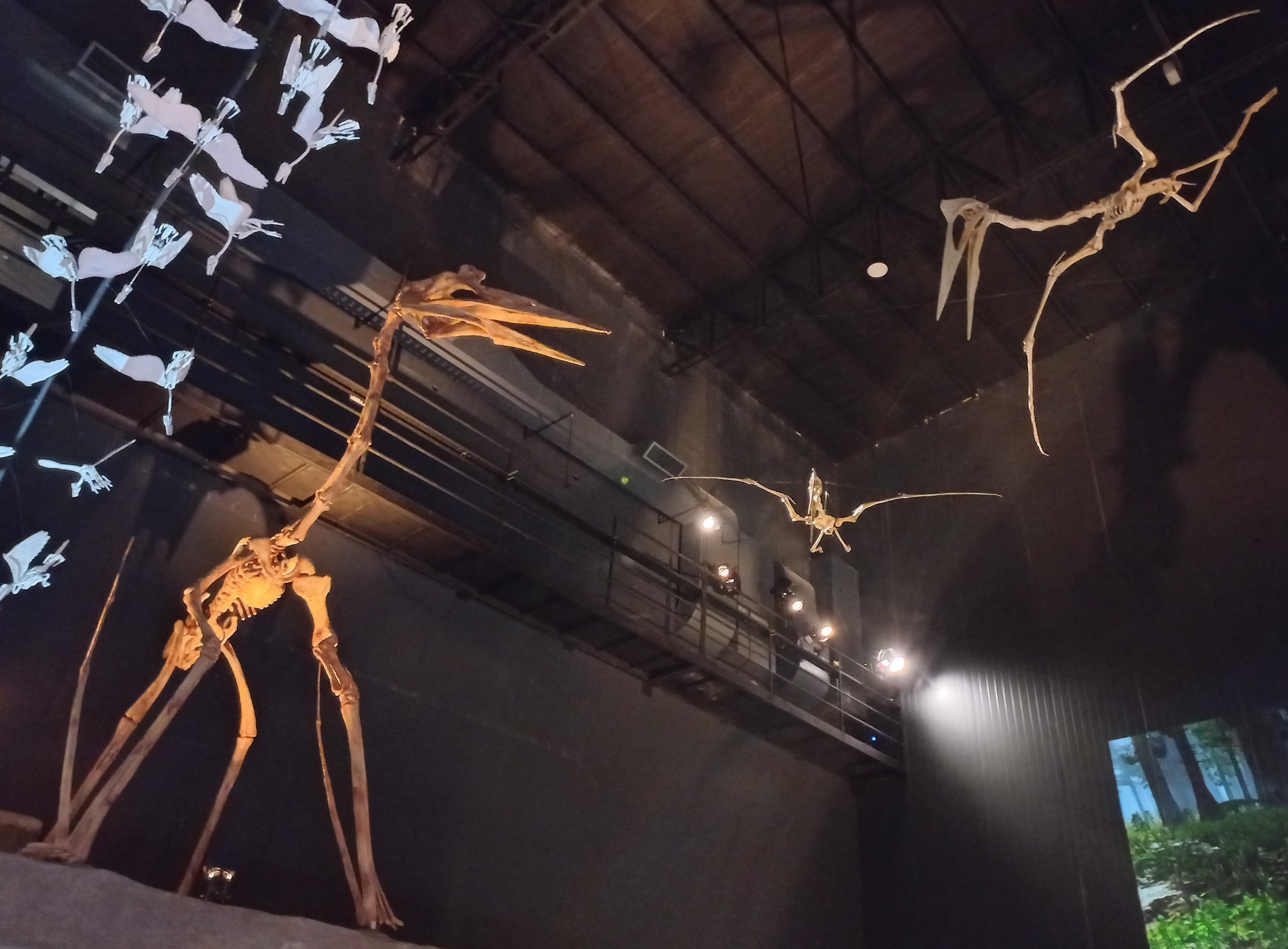
- Reconstructed skeletons in flight pose (right), with Thanatosdrakon on the ground, in Museo Paleontológico Egidio Feruglio

Scientific classification
- Kingdom: Animalia
- Phylum: Chordata
- Class: Reptilia
- Order: †Pterosauria
- Suborder: †Pterodactyloidea
- Clade: †Azhdarchoidea
- Family: †Azhdarchidae
- Genus: †Aerotitan; Novas et al., 2012
- Species: †A. sudamericanus

Binomial name
- †Aerotitan sudamericanus Novas et al., 2012

= Aerotitan =

Aerotitan Temporal range: Maastrichtian ~70 Ma

Genus of azhdarchid pterosaur from the Late Cretaceous

Aerotitan is a genus of azhdarchid pterosaur that lived during the Maastrichtian age of the Late Cretaceous period in what is now Argentina. Its only remains, which consist of a partial snout, were found in the Allen Formation of the Neuquén Basin in northern Patagonia. This specimen was made the holotype of Aerotitan sudamericanus by paleontologist Fernando Novas and colleagues. The generic name combines the Greek word ἀήρ, meaning "air" and Titan, alluding to the pterosaur's large size. The specific name is a reference to its origin, South America.

Aerotitan is the first pterosaur belonging the family Azhdarchidae that was found in South America. A wingspan of at least 5 m (16 ft) has been estimated for this pterosaur. Within Azhdarchidae, the genus Mistralazhdarcho from France seems to have been the closest relative of Aerotitan, based on numerous phylogenetic analyses that have recovered them together in a clade.

== Discovery and naming ==
The only specimen of Aerotitan is MPCN-PV 0054, which has been recovered near the Bajo de Arriagada site from a layer of the upper Allen Formation in Patagonia, Argentina. It consists of a partial rostrum (snout). In 2012, it was made the holotype specimen of the new genus and type species Aerotitan sudamericanus, named and described by paleontologists Fernando Novas, Martin Kundrat, Federico Agnolín, Martin Ezcurra, Per Erik Ahlberg, Marcelo Isasi, Alberto Arriagada and Pablo Chafrat. The generic name Aerotitan is a combination of the Greek word ἀήρ, aer, meaning "air", and Titan, in reference to the fact that the species represents a large flying reptile. The specific name sudamericanus refers to its provenance from South America.

== Description ==
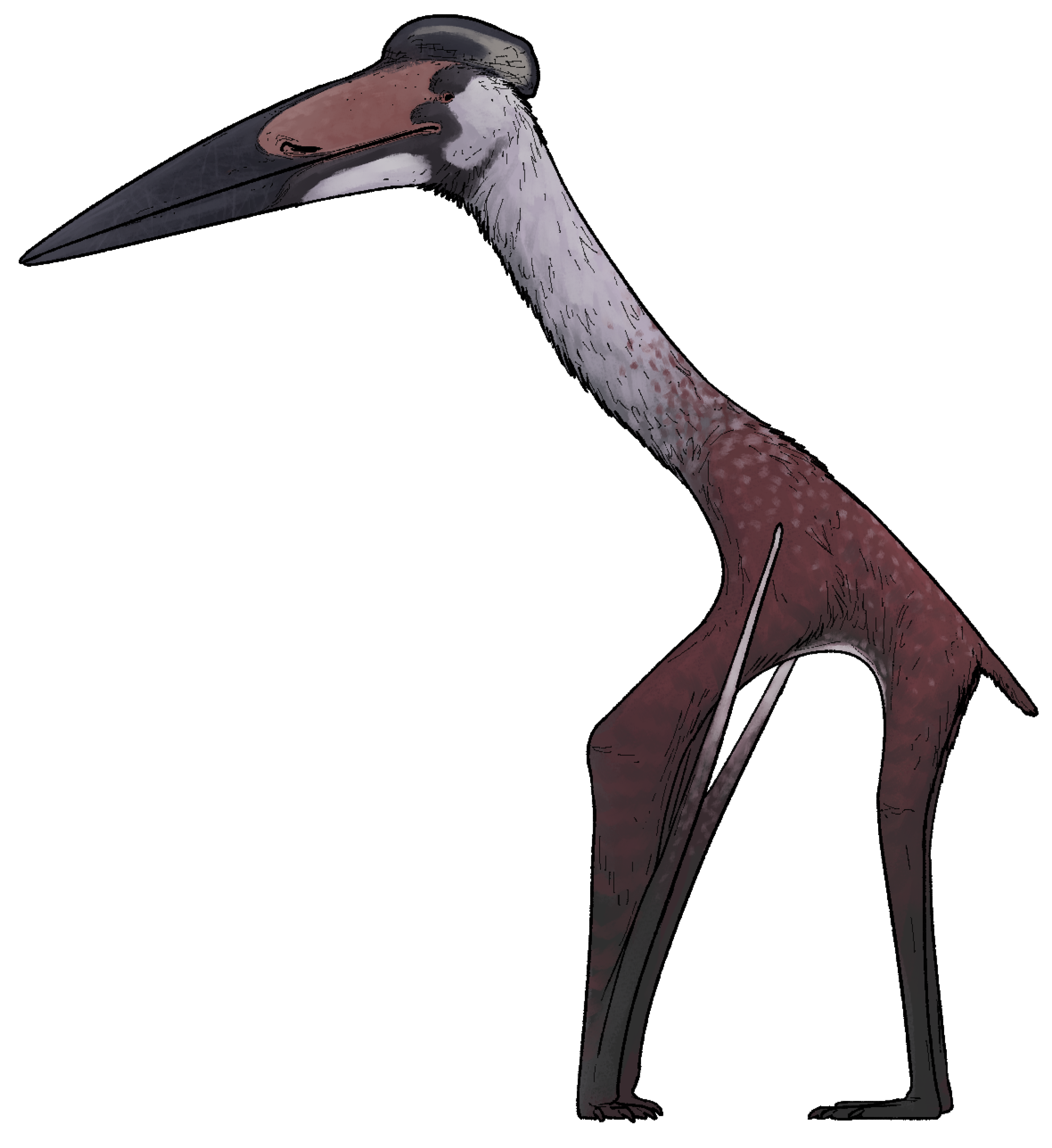
Life restoration

The only specimen of Aerotitan that has been described is an incomplete snout, which has a preserved length of 264 mm (10.4 in). It is elongated and transversely compressed, the jaws being toothless. Based on this specimen, the wingspan of Aerotitan has been estimated to be at least 5 m (16 ft). In 2021, a thorough analysis by paleontologist Rubi Pêgas and colleagues concluded that this specimen represented the lower jaw, contrasting with a few previous studies that have concluded it as an upper jaw. Comparing it with specimens of other azhdarchids, they deduced that the genus Mistralazhdarcho from France shared the most features, especially the mandibular tip.

== Classification ==
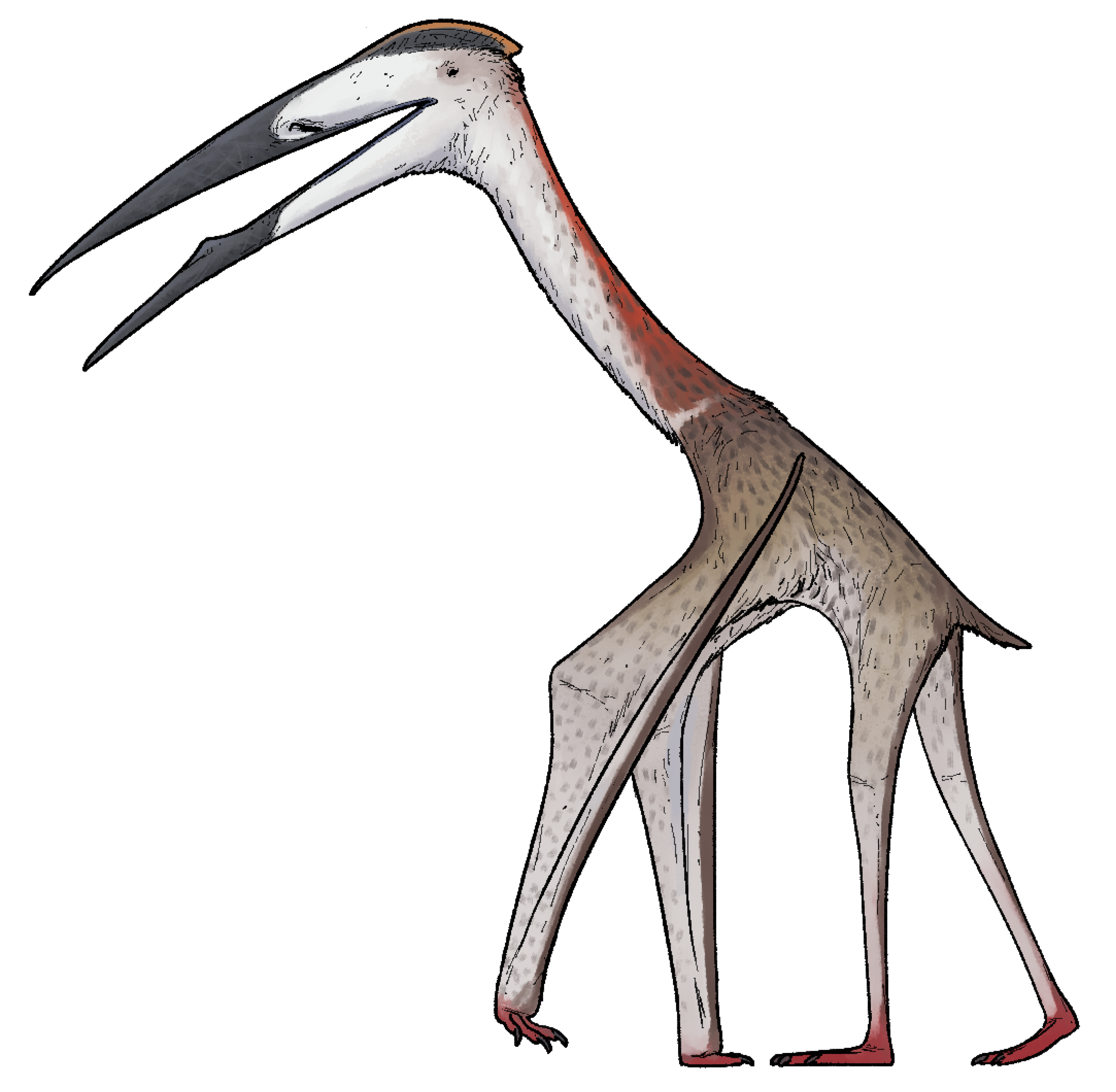
Life reconstruction of the azhdarchid Mistralazhdarcho, which is recovered as the sister taxon of Aerotitan in numerous studies

In its description, Aerotitan was assigned to the family Azhdarchidae. This would make it the first unambiguous azhdarchid found in South America. However, in 2018, a study published by paleontologist Nicholas Longrich and colleagues classified Aerotitan as a member of the family Thalassodromidae, being the sister taxon of Alanqa (a pterosaur also assigned as an azhdarchid in its initial description). Such assignment is stated as only tentative and is not well-supported. As is the case, in their 2021 analysis, Pêgas and colleagues noted dissimilarities between Aerotitan and pterosaurs belonging to the Thalassodromidae (referred to as Thalassodrominae in the analysis, based on its placement within Tapejaridae at the time). They supported an azhdarchid identity for Aerotitan, reverting back to its original classification during its initial description. In the same year, a phylogenetic analysis by American paleontologist Brian Andres placed Aerotitan in Azhdarchidae, further corroborating its initial placement. Within Azhdarchidae, it is recovered in the subfamily Azhdarchinae, as the sister taxon of Mistralazhdarcho. Its close relationship with Mistralazhdarcho would later be demonstrated again in various subsequent analyses. One such example is the 2023 study by Pêgas and colleagues. In their phylogenetic analysis, they found Aerotitan forming a trichotomy with both Mistralazhdarcho and Arambourgiania. However, instead of finding it within Azhdarchinae, they recovered it within the subfamily Quetzalcoatlinae.

Cladogram by Andres (2021).

- Azhdarchidae
  - Azhdarchinae
    - Azhdarcho lancicollis
    - - Albadraco tharmisensis
      - - Aerotitan sudamericanus
        - Mistralazhdarcho maggii
  - Quetzalcoatlinae
    - - Aralazhdarcho bostobensis
      - Phosphatodraco mauritanicus
    - - Eurazhdarcho langendorfensis
      - - Zhejiangopterus linhaiensis
        - - Wellnhopterus brevirostris
          - Cryodrakon boreas
          - - Hatzegopteryx thambema
            - - Arambourgiania philadelphiae
              - - Quetzalcoatlus lawsoni
                - Quetzalcoatlus northropi

Cladogram by Pêgas and colleagues (2023).

- Azhdarchidae
  - - Eurazhdarcho langendorfensis
    - - Phosphatodraco mauritanicus
      - Wellnhopterus brevirostris
      - Aralazhdarcho bostobensis
  - - Zhejiangopterus linhaiensis
    - - Azhdarcho lancicollis
      - Quetzalcoatlinae
        - Cryodrakon boreas
        - - - Hatzegopteryx thambema
            - Albadraco tharmisensis
          - - - Quetzalcoatlus northropi
              - Quetzalcoatlus lawsoni
              - Quetzalcoatlus sp. (FSAC-OB 14)
            - - Mistralazhdarcho maggii
              - Aerotitan sudamericanus
              - Arambourgiania philadelphiae

== See also ==
- Timeline of pterosaur research
