= Mátyás Vremir =

Romanian geologist and palaeontologist (1970–2020)

Mátyás Vremir (13 November 1970 – 24 July 2020) was a Romanian geologist and palaeontologist.

== Education and career ==
Vremir was born on 13 November 1970 in Cluj, the son of artists Mircea Vremir and Ildikó Kováts. He studied geology at Babeş-Bolyai University, obtaining a bachelor's degree in 1999 and a master's degree in 2001. After graduating he had a varied career as a teacher, geological consultant for the petroleum industry in Central Africa and with his own firm in Cluj, and owner of a Tatar-themed bar. He also worked for several museums in Hungary and was affiliated with the Transylvanian Museum Society.

Well known for his eye for fossils, he worked as a palaeontological contractor in Crimea and Bavaria, and conducted his own reconnaissance projects in Romania, in collaboration with American palaeontologist Mark Norell. He is credited with the discovery of Balaur bondoc, a poodle-sized dinosaur; an Azhdarchidae specimen nicknamed "Dracula" that is the largest-known pterosaur; and Litovoi tholocephalos, a Late Cretaceous mammal exhibiting insular dwarfism.

== Personal life ==
Vremir was married to Márta Veress and had two sons. He died of cancer on 24 July 2020.
