= Primitive (phylogenetics) =

Feature inherited from common ancestor

In phylogenetics, a primitive (or ancestral or basal) character, trait, or feature of a lineage or taxon is one that is inherited from the common ancestor of a clade (or clade group) and has undergone little change since. Conversely, a trait that only appears in some members of the clade group, but not all, is called advanced or derived. A clade is a group of organisms that consists of a common ancestor and all its lineal descendants.

A primitive trait is the original condition of that trait in the common ancestor; advanced indicates a notable change from the original condition. These terms in biology contain no judgement about the sophistication, superiority, value or adaptiveness of the named trait. "Primitive" in biology means only that the character appeared first in the common ancestor of a clade group and has been passed on largely intact to more recent members of the clade. "Advanced" means the character has evolved within a later subgroup of the clade.

These terms must be very strictly used since they could lead to misleading conclusions about evolution as a whole. In particular “primitive” might cause one to believe the organism in question is basic. For this reason terms like “basal” and “simple” may be better for this case.

Phylogenetics is utilized to determine evolutionary relationships and relatedness, to ultimately depict accurate evolutionary lineages. Evolutionary relatedness between living species can be connected by descent from common ancestry. These evolutionary lineages can thereby be portrayed through a phylogenetic tree, or cladogram, where varying relatedness amongst species is evidently depicted. Through this tree, organisms can be categorized by divergence from the common ancestor, and primitive characters, to clades of organisms with shared derived character states. Furthermore, cladograms allow researchers to view the changes and evolutionary alterations occurring in a species over time as they move from primitive characters to varying derived character states.

Cladograms are important for scientists as they allow them to classify and hypothesize the origin and future of organisms. Cladograms allow scientists to propose their evolutionary scenarios about the lineage from a primitive trait to a derived one. By understanding how the trait came to be, scientists can hypothesize the environment that specific organism was in and how that affected the evolutionary adaptations of the trait that came to be.

Other, more technical, terms for these two conditions—for example, "plesiomorphic" and "synapomorphic"—are frequently encountered; see the table below.

== Usage ==
At least three other sets of terms are synonymous with the terms "primitive" and "advanced". The technical terms are considered preferable because they are less likely to convey the sense that the trait mentioned is inferior, simpler, or less adaptive (e.g., as in non-vascular ("lower") and vascular ("higher") plants). The terms "plesiomorphy" and "apomorphy" are typically used in the technical literature: for example, when a plesiomorphic trait is shared by more than one member of a clade, the trait is called a symplesiomorphy, that is, a shared primitive trait; a shared derived trait is a synapomorphy.

| Primitive | Advanced |
|---|---|
| Ancestral | Derived |
| Plesiomorphic | Apomorphic |
| Symplesiomorphic | Synapomorphic |

The amount of variation of characters can assist in depicting greater relatedness amongst species, and conversely show the lack of relatedness between species. Analysis of character variation also aids in distinguishing primitive characters from derived characters. The term derived and primitive, or ancestral, is used in reference to characters and character state. In doing so, a derived character is depicted as a character procured through evolution from the previous ancestral state, and persisting due to fixation of derived alleles. Whereas, a primitive character is one that is originally present in the ancestral population. Primitive characters are avoided as they depict the ancestral character state. Conversely, derived characters depict the alteration of characters from the ancestral state because selection favored organisms with that derived trait.

== Primitiveness of characters is determined by context ==
"Primitive" and "advanced" are relative terms. When a trait is called primitive, the determination is based on the perspective from which the trait is viewed. Any trait can be both primitive (ancestral) and advanced (derived) depending on the context.

=== Examples ===
In the clade of vertebrates, legs are an advanced trait since it is a feature that appears in the clade. However, in the clade of tetrapods, legs are primitive since they were inherited from a common ancestor.

The terms "primitive" and "advanced", etc., are not properly used in referring to a species or an organism as any species or organism is a mosaic of primitive and derived traits. Using "primitive" and "advanced" may lead to "ladder thinking" (compare the Latin term scala naturae 'ladder of nature'), which is the thought that all species are evolving because they are striving toward supremacy. When this form of thinking is used, humans are typically considered perfect and all other organisms are of less quality than them. This can cause the misconception of one species being an ancestor to another species, when in fact both species are extant. Homo sapiens, for example have large brains (a derived trait) and five fingers (a primitive trait) in their lineage. Species are constantly evolving, so a frog is not biologically more primitive than a human as each has been evolving continuously since each lineage split from their common ancestor.
