= Ipubi Formation =

Geologic formation in Brazil

- Stratigraphic range: Aptian-Albian; ~113–111 Ma
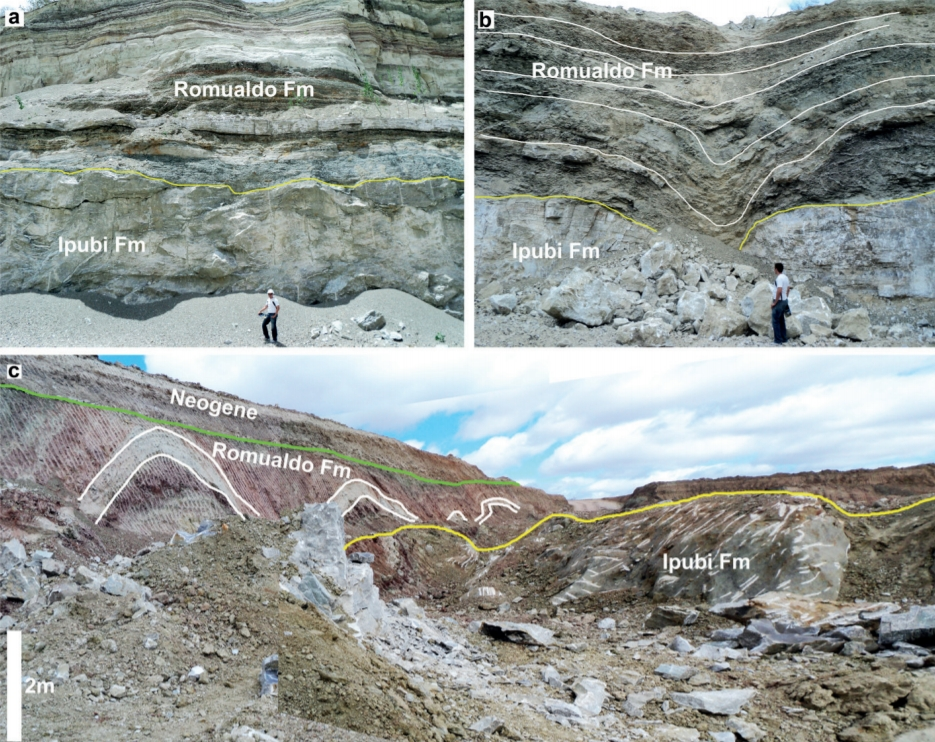
- Outcrop of the Ipubi Formation underlying the Romualdo Formation
- Type: Geological formation
- Unit of: Santana Group
- Underlies: Romualdo Formation
- Overlies: Crato Formation
- Thickness: up to 40 m (130 ft) average 15 m (49 ft)

Lithology
- Primary: Shale, anhydrite
- Other: Sandstone

Location
- Coordinates: 5.6°S 64.3°W
- Approximate paleocoordinates: 9.2°S 34.0°W
- Region: Pernambuco, Piauí & Ceará
- Country: Brazil
- Extent: Araripe Basin

Type section
- Named for: Ipubi
- Named by: Beurlen
- Year defined: 1971
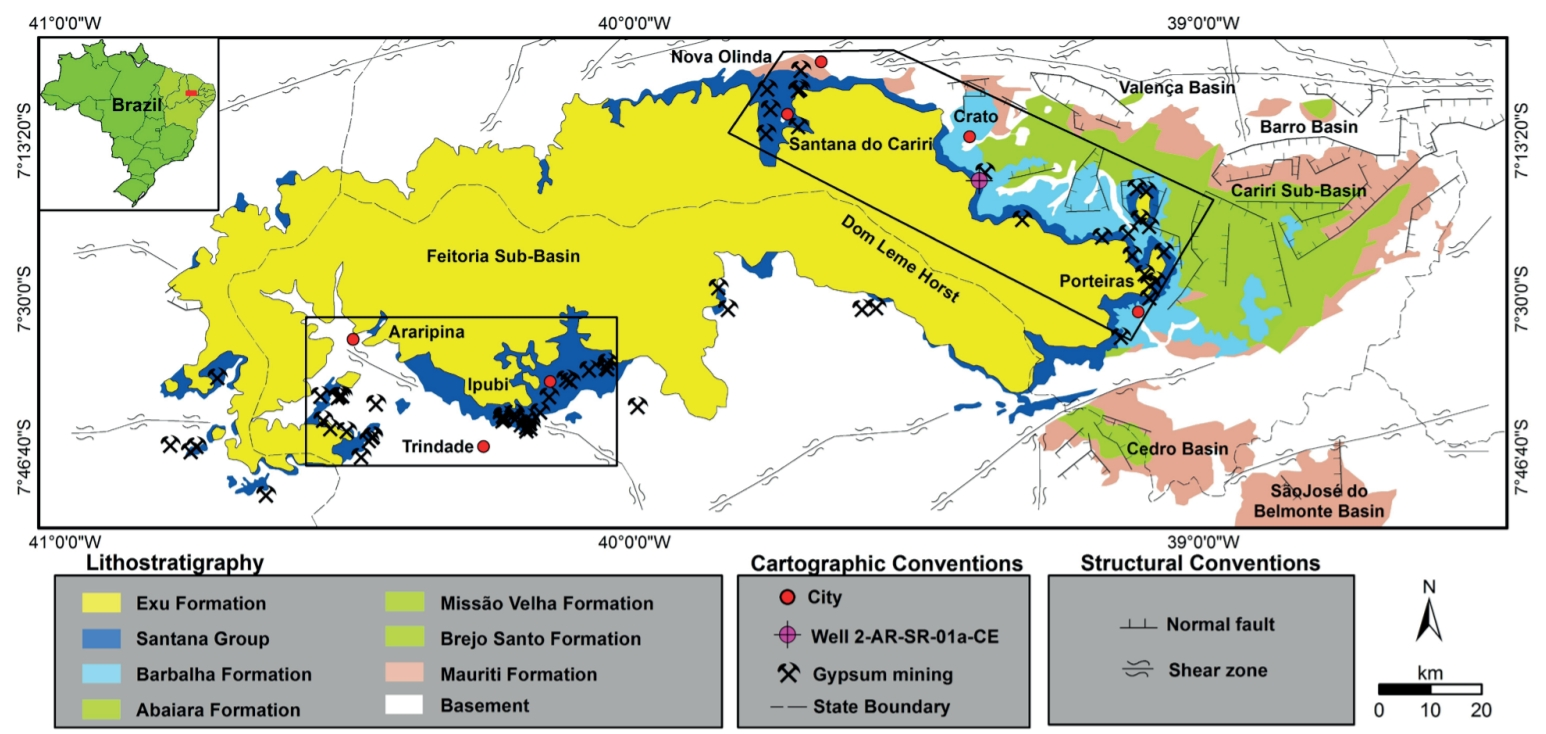
- The Ipubi Formation is found in the southeastern part of the Araripe Basin, near Ipubi

The Ipubi Formation is the middle geological formation of the Santana Group, the middle part of the Araripe Group, in the Araripe Basin of northeastern Brazil. The formation is dated to the Aptian to Albian stages of the Early Cretaceous, unconformably overlying the Crato Formation and unconformably overlain by the Romualdo Formation, formerly known as the Romualdo Member of the Santana Formation. The averaging 15 metres (49 ft) thick Ipubi Formation comprises shales and sandstones in the lower section and evaporites in the upper part of the formation, deposited in a transgressive to highstand lacustrine environment in the Araripe rift basin.

The Ipubi Formation contains little fossils, apart from an indeterminate Pelomedusoides turtle, but contains high levels of TOC and the formation is identified as a potential target for shale gas development.

== Description ==
The Ipubi Formation was described as a member of the Santana Formation by Beurlen in 1971. Later revision of the stratigraphy elevated the members of the former Santana Formation to separate formations; Crato, Ipubi and Romualdo from base to top. The formations were subsequently included in the Santana Group, representing the middle part of the formerly described Araripe Group.

=== Basin history ===
The tectono-sedimentary evolution of the Araripe Basin, located in the Borborema Geologic Province, encompasses four stages, with five tectonostratigraphic phases:
1) Syneclise phase - Silurian to Devonian - characterized by tectonic quiescence in the Borborema Province. It is represented by the deposits of the Cariri Formation, that include medium to coarse-grained quartz sandstones, locally conglomeratic, deposited in large braided fluvial systems
2) Pre-rift phase - Tithonian - characterized by the mechanical subsidence due to lithosphere thinning that preceded the rift. It is represented by the Brejo Santo Formation, that comprises red shales and claystones, and the Missão Velha Formation, constituted by medium to coarse-grained quartz-feldspathic sandstones, locally conglomeratic, that contains entire trunks and fragments of silicified wood (Dadoxilon benderi) conifer
3) Rift phase - Berriasian to Hauterivian - characterized by increasing mechanical subsidence that created a system of grabens and half grabens. It is represented by the Abaiara Formation, that includes shales, siltstones, sandstones and conglomerates
4) Post-Rift I phase - Aptian to Albian - characterized by thermal subsidence. The lowermost unit Barbalha Formation, represents a fluviolacustrine phase and is composed of red and gray shales, siltstones and claystones.

The Santana Group was formed during this stage and comprises three stratigraphic units:

- Crato Formation that is composed of six intervals of laminated limestones (C1 to C6), interbedded with calciferous siltstones and marls, and is very rich in fossils of vertebrate and invertebrate organisms
- Ipubi Formation, that is mainly composed of organic-rich, black greenish bituminous shales, claystones and algal limestones that are interbedded with gypsum-anhydrite beds
- Romualdo Formation, that represents a calciferous siliciclastic succession composed of fine to medium-grained sandstones, argillaceous siltstones, calciferous shales, and limestones, very rich in fossils. This formation recorded the marine proto-Atlantic incursion that involved the Araripe Basin, and other interior basins and created a large seaway throughout the Borborema Province during the Albian

5) Post-rift II phase - Albian to Cenomanian - characterized by a major sag phase, and is formed by two stratigraphic units:

- Araripina Formation, that occurs in the western region of the basin and is composed by rhythmites and heterolithic layers of reddish, purplish and yellowish fine-grained sandstone and mudstone
- Exu Formation, that comprises medium-to coarse grained sandstones, fine grained clayey sandstones and local conglomeratic beds

=== Lithologies and deposition ===
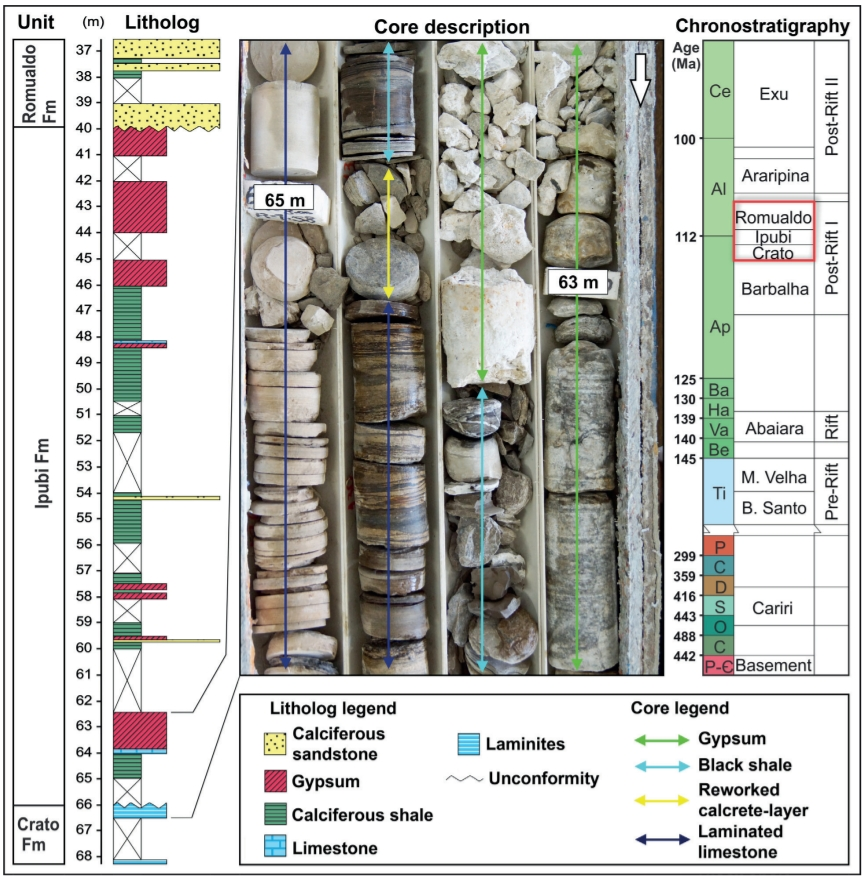
Lithological and core log of the Ipubi Formation

Palynomorph associations showed that the lacustrine system evolved in an arid–semiarid tropical area where the most characteristic flora consisted of conifers, Gnetales, Bennettitales and early angiosperms. The Ipubi Formation is characterized by containing abundant algal/bacterial-derived well-preserved organic matter. The pattern of organic matter accumulation and preservation corresponds well with cyclical paleoenvironmental changes (from anoxic to oxic bottom conditions and from a fresh to saline upper water layer), which affected the shallow lacustrine system. The deposition of thin, organic matter-rich mudstones probably occurred during higher water levels, which resulted in relatively low salinity waters and low detrital contribution to the inner lacustrine zones.

Data collected from outcrops and boreholes indicate that the Ipubi Formation is separated from the underlying Crato Formation and the overlying Romualdo Formation by regional unconformities in proximal domains. The lower unconformity separates the top of the Crato Formation, which is mainly represented by its uppermost interval of laminated limestones (C6), from the basal black shales and claystone deposits of the Ipubi Formation. These basal deposits formed due to the transgressive event that expanded the relative lake level beyond the previous extension of the Crato Formation over the adjacent basement areas. During the Ipubi transgression, anoxic conditions influenced the formation of basal black shales with high levels of TOC.

The carbonaceous pyrobitumen shales of the Ipubi Formation occur as a 0.5 to 2 metres (1.6 to 6.6 ft) layer in most of the mines in the region and have a potential for shale gas development.

=== Sequence stratigraphy ===
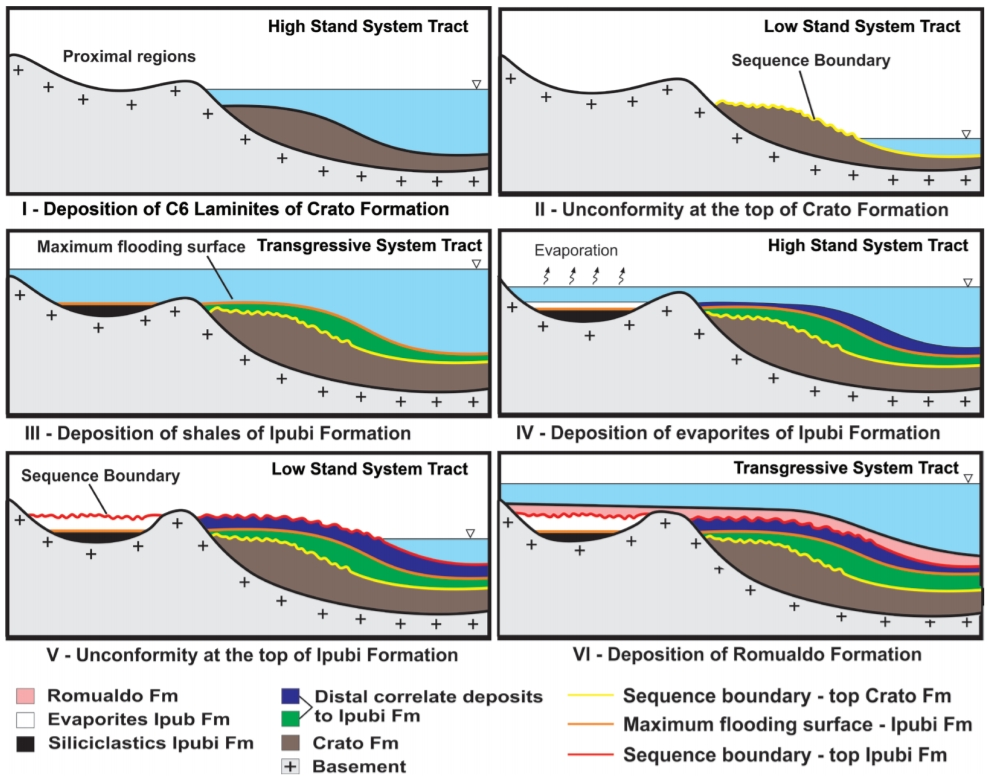
Schematic development of the depositional environments in the Araripe Basin

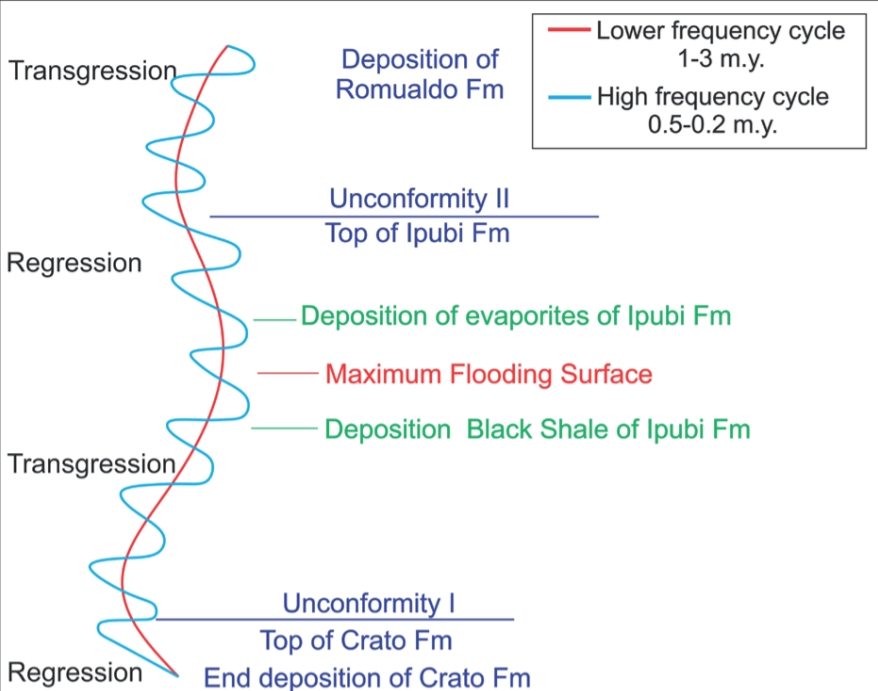
Sequence stratigraphy of the Ipubi Formation with respect to the underlying and overlying units

The deposition of the Ipubi Formation represents a transition from a transgressive systems tract to a maximum flooding surface. Six stages in the depositional cycle were described by Fabin et al. in 2018:

1. Stage I - Pulsating expansion of the Araripe Lake during the post-rift phase created few depositional sequences, including the Crato Formation. There is no evidence of major relative lake level falls during the deposition of the Crato Formation, although the presence of stratigraphic levels recording the mass mortality of young specimens of fishes (Dastilbe elongatus) and halite pseudomorphs suggests that hydrological/biological conditions (eutrophication, salinity and oxygenation) may have experienced oscillations. The formation of halite pseudomorphs (hoppers) may indicate that minor relative lake level falls or severe climate periods occurred, although carbonate deposition continued. These oscillations may have intensified the dense-stratified effect of the water column, thus increasing the anoxic conditions in the deeper regions of the lake.
2. Stage II - At the end of the cycle that formed the Crato Formation, a major fall in the relative lake level caused the subaerial exposure of proximal regions. This caused an erosional process that affected the deposits of this unit. The lowest position of the relative lake level marks the maximum expression of the subaerial erosion and the first sequence boundary of the studied succession.
3. Stage III - A new relative lake level rise occurred and caused an important transgression over the proximal areas, including regions not previously covered by the basin domains. This event possibly caused the drowning of sedimentary sources. The balance of sedimentary influx and organic production influenced the establishment of anoxic conditions. Siliciclastic deposits, which are dominated by calciferous organic-rich black shales, were deposited above the unconformity of the top of the Crato Formation. These deposits mark the base of the Ipubi Formation.
4. Stage IV - After the transgressive pulse, the stagnation of the relative lake level established a high stand, under increasingly arid conditions, that led to the formation of isolated salinas or coastal sabkhas along the proximal regions. Increasing stagnation and small oscillations in the relative lake level possibly are the causes of the main phase of evaporites deposition of the Ipubi Formation. Most of the evaporite deposits formed under subaqueous conditions and are intercalated with fine-grained siliciclastic deposits. These isolated salinas or sabkhas may have been intermittently connected with the lake waters, which caused occasional interruptions in evaporite deposition.
5. Stage V - Another expressive relative lake level fall ended the deposition of siliciclastic-evaporitic succession in proximal regions. This forced regression exposed the proximal zones, and triggered the karstification processes of evaporite beds. The consequent erosion and reworking of evaporite deposits, and other lithologies, created a new sequence boundary that marks the upper limit of the Ipubi Formation. According to the biostratigraphic record obtained from boreholes across the basin, siliciclastic sedimentation continued within the depocenters, what indicates that the relative lake level was not completely depleted, and a correlative surface probably formed across distal regions. The karstification processes of the evaporite layers, created a ruiniform relief featuring escarpments, depressions and sinkholes.
6. Stage VI - A new transgressive event triggered by a new relative lake level rise created the depositional sequence that comprises the Romualdo Formation that overlies the Ipubi Formation. The marine influence on this transgression, that established a seaway in the interior of Northeast Brazil, is well documented by abundant occurrence of marine fossils (sharks and rays). This new transgression, that followed the erosion of evaporite beds, caused a renewed syndepositional karstification of these deposits. The new inundation caused syn-depositional variations in accommodation space due to the increase in dissolution and collapse of the upper evaporite bodies, as well as the syn-depositional deformation of the strata of the Romualdo Formation.

== Fossil content ==
While the underlying Crato and overlying Romualdo Formations are particularly rich in fossils, comprising flora, fish, arthropods, insects, snakes, turtles, dinosaurs and pterosaurs, the Ipubi Formation contains little fossil material. Fossils of a Pelomedusoides turtle were found in the formation. The material, archived as CPCA 3560, consists of crushed fragments of the skull, a partial lower jaw and the carapace. The fossil was described in 2011 by Ribeiro Oliveira et al., who were unable to definitively assign the specimen to a specific genus. The same specimen was mentioned by Fielding et al. in 2005 and reported as Araripemys.. An Theropoda femur is known, The plant Brachyphyllum, An indeterminate Shrimp Caridea.

The formation contains the following fossils:

Fish: Notelops, Cladocyclus, Rhacolepis, Tharrhias, Dastilbe, Santanichthys, Placidichtys, Santanasalmo.

== See also ==
- Ariri Formation
- Itapecuru Formation
