= Romualdo Formation =

Brazilian geologic formation

- Stratigraphic range: Early Albian; ~111–108 Ma
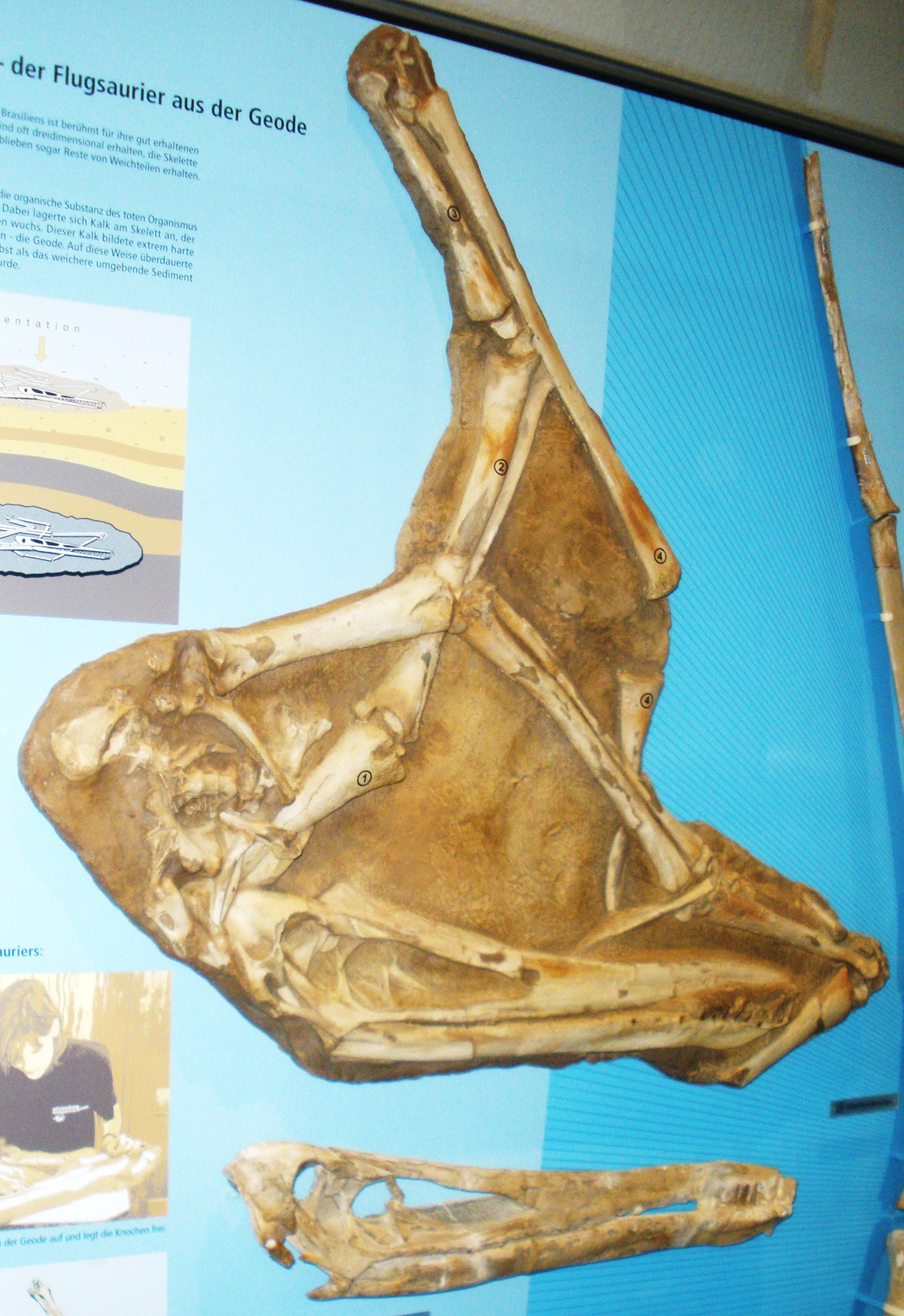
- Fossils of Anhanguera (top) and Santanadactylus (bottom) from the Romualdo Formation
- Type: Geological formation
- Unit of: Santana Group
- Underlies: Exu & Arajara Formations
- Overlies: Crato & Ipubi Formations
- Thickness: 2–10 m (6.6–32.8 ft)

Lithology
- Primary: Mudstone
- Other: Limestone, shale

Location
- Coordinates: 7.2°S 39.3°W
- Approximate paleocoordinates: 12.2°S 10.7°W
- Region: Pernambuco, Piauí & Ceará
- Country: Brazil
- Extent: Araripe Basin
- Romualdo Formation (Brazil)

The Romualdo Formation is a geologic Konservat-Lagerstätte in northeastern Brazil's Araripe Basin where the states of Pernambuco, Piauí and Ceará come together. The geological formation, previously designated as the Romualdo Member of the Santana Formation, named after the village of Santana do Cariri, lies at the base of the Araripe Plateau. It was discovered by Johann Baptist von Spix in 1819. The strata were deposited during the Aptian stage of the Early Cretaceous in a lacustrine rift basin with shallow marine incursions of the proto-Atlantic. At that time, the South Atlantic was opening up in a long narrow shallow sea.

The Romualdo Formation earns the designation of Lagerstätte due to an exceedingly well preserved and diverse fossil faunal assemblage. Some 25 species of fossil fishes are often found with stomach contents preserved, enabling paleontologists to study predator–prey relationships in this ecosystem. There are also fine examples of pterosaurs, reptiles and invertebrates, and crocodylomorphs. Even dinosaurs are represented (Spinosauridae, Tyrannosauroidea, Compsognathidae). The unusual taphonomy of the site resulted in limestone accretions that formed nodules around dead organisms, preserving even soft parts of their anatomy. In preservation, the nodules are etched away with acid, and the fossils often prepared by the transfer technique.

Local mining activities for cement and construction damage the sites. Trade in illegally collected fossils has sprung up from the decade of 1970, driven by the remarkable state of preservation and beauty of these fossils and amounting to a considerable local industry. An urgent preservation program is being called for by paleontologists.

In addition, the weathering of Romualdo Formation rocks has contributed soil conditions unlike elsewhere in the region. The Araripe manakin (Antilophia bokermanni) is a very rare bird that was discovered only in the late 20th century; it is not known from anywhere outside the characteristic forest that grows on the Chapada do Araripe soils formed ultimately from Romualdo Formation rocks.

== Geology and dating ==
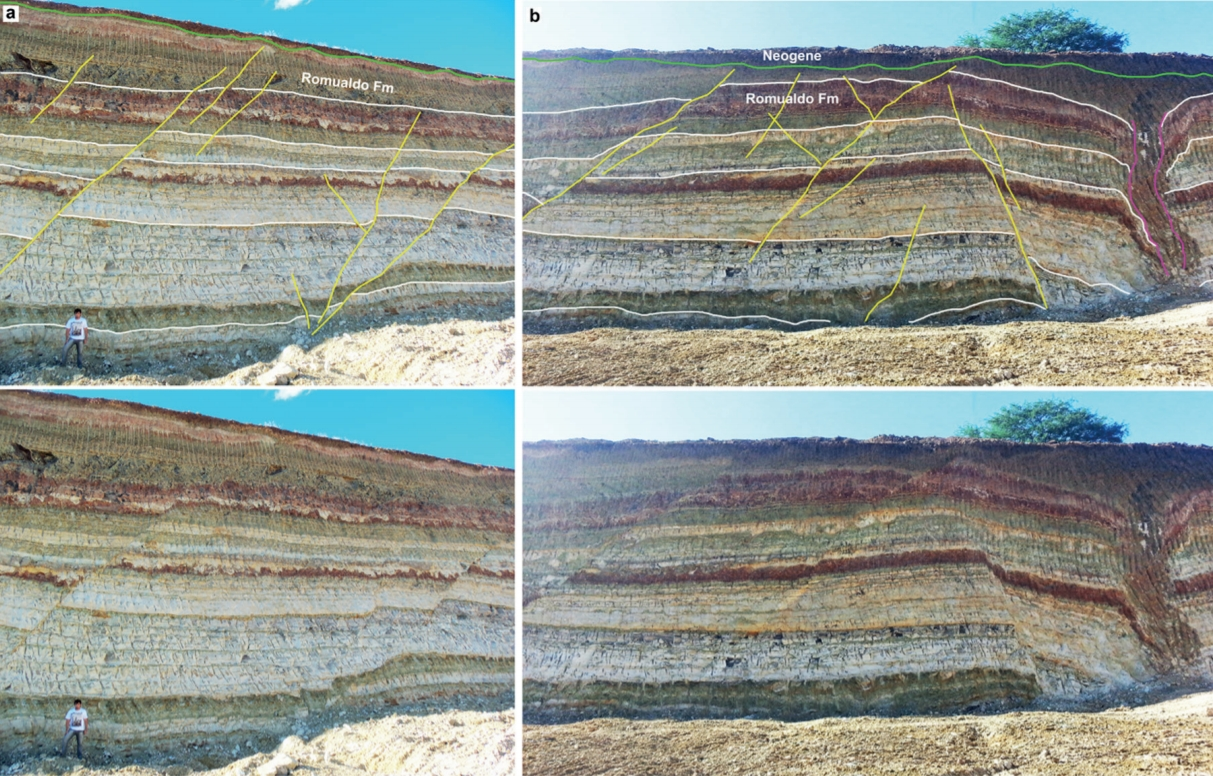
Outcrop and interpretation of the Romualdo Formation

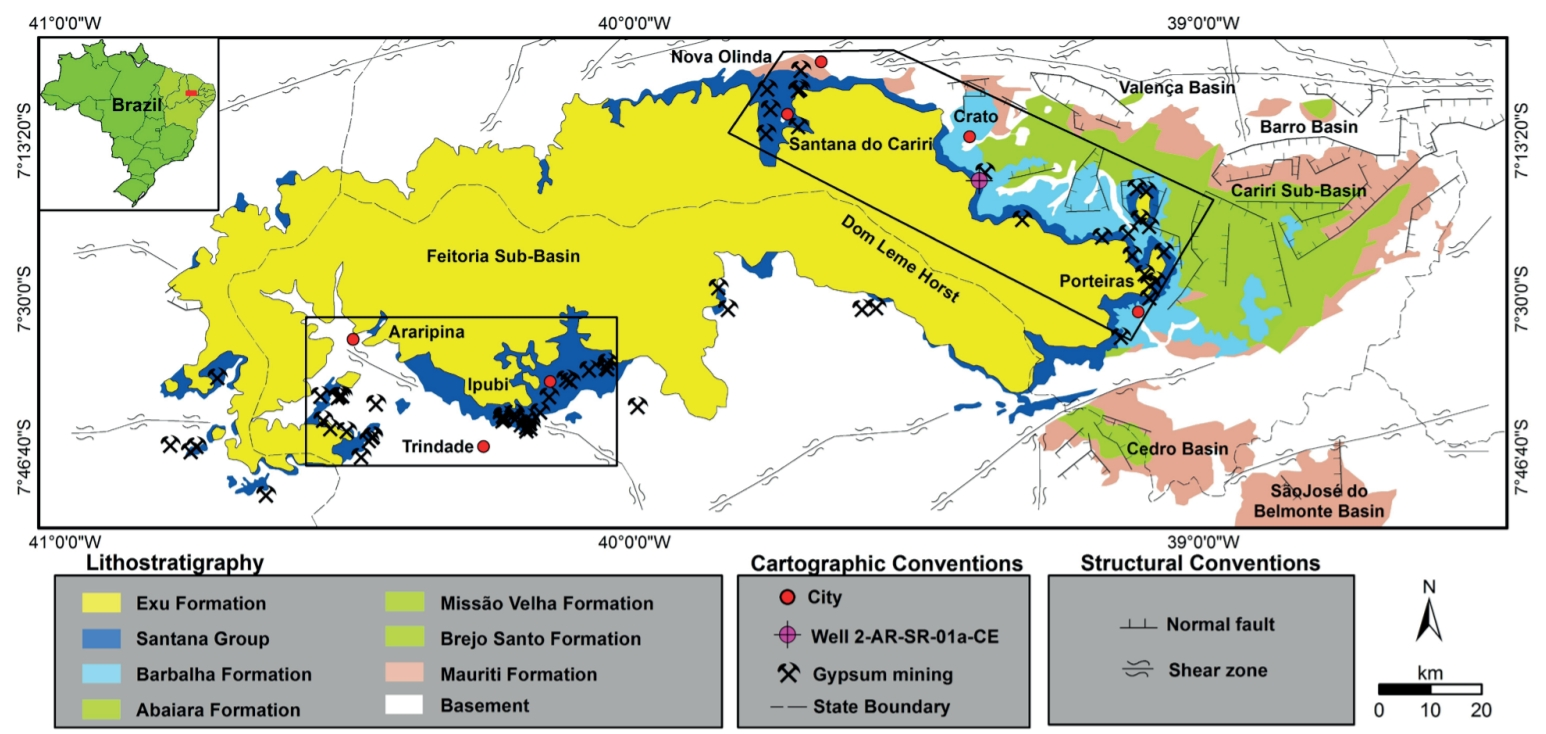
Extent of the Santana Group, to which the Romualdo Formation belongs, in blue

The Crato Formation was previously considered the lowest member of the then Santana Formation, but has been elevated to a formal formation. The Crato Formation is the product of a single phase, where complicated sequence of sediment strata reflect changeable conditions in the opening sea. The age of the Romualdo Formation, formerly known as the Romualdo Member of the Santana Formation, has been controversial, though most workers have agreed that it lies on or near the Aptian–Albian boundary, about 112 million years ago. Nevertheless, a Cenomanian age cannot be ruled out.

The extent of the Crato unit and its relationship to the Romualdo Formation had long been ill-defined. It was not until a 2007 volume on the unit by Martill, Bechly and Loveridge that the Crato Formation was given a formal type locality, and was formally made a distinct formation separate from the Romualdo Formation, which is about 10 Ma younger.

== Fossil content ==
Color key
Taxon	Reclassified taxon	Taxon falsely reported as present	Dubious taxon or junior synonym	Ichnotaxon	Ootaxon	Morphotaxon

Notes
Uncertain or tentative taxa are in small text; ~~crossed out~~ taxa are discredited.

=== Archosaurs ===
Indeterminate remains of non-avian theropods, avialans, ornithischians, and possibly oviraptorosaurs have been found in Ceara state, Brazil. The oviraptorosaurian remains have been re-identified as megaraptoran fossils.

==== Dinosaurs ====
Dinosaurs of the Romualdo Formation
Genus	Species	Presence	Materials	Notes	Images
Angaturama	A. limai	Ceará	Partial skull (rostralmost portion). Possible junior synonym of Irritator challengeri.	A spinosaurid.	
Aratasaurus	A. museunacionali	Ceará	Partial right hindlimb	A coelurosaur.	
Irritator	I. challengeri	Ceará	Partial skull (posterior half); one of the most complete spinosaurid skulls known	A spinosaurid	
Megaraptora indet	Indeterminate	Unknown	Three sacral vertebrae, two caudal vertebrae, and a partial ilium	A megaraptorid theropod. Originally identified as a possible oviraptorosaur.	
Mirischia	M. asymmetrica	Pernambuco	Pelvis and partial left hindlimb	A compsognathid	
Santanaraptor	S. placidus	Ceará	Some caudal vertebrae, partial pelvis, most of both hindlimbs	A possible tyrannosauroid	

==== Crocodylomorphs ====
Crocodylomorphs of the Romualdo Formation
Genus	Species	Presence	Materials	Notes	Images
Araripesuchus	A. gomesii	Romualdo Formation	Type specimen 423-R is a single skull articulating with part of a lower jaw. A more complete specimen, AMNH 24450, is at the American Museum of Natural History.	A uruguaysuchid crocodyloformes	Araripesuchus wegeneri
Caririsuchus	C. camposi	Romualdo Formation		A peirosaurid crocodyliform	Araripesuchus wegeneri

=== Pterosaurs ===
Pterosaurs of the Romualdo Formation
Genus	Species	Presence	Materials	Notes	Images
Anhanguera	A. araripensis			A pterodactyloid pterosaur	Anhanguera blittersdorffi Anhanguera piscator Cearadactylus atrox Kariridraco dianae Maaradactylus kellneri Tapejara wellnhoferi Thalassodromeus sethi Tropeognathus mesembrinus Tupuxuara leonardii (left) and Tupuxuara longicristatus (right)
Anhanguera	A. blittersdorffi		A complete skull	A pterodactyloid pterosaur	Anhanguera blittersdorffi Anhanguera piscator Cearadactylus atrox Kariridraco dianae Maaradactylus kellneri Tapejara wellnhoferi Thalassodromeus sethi Tropeognathus mesembrinus Tupuxuara leonardii (left) and Tupuxuara longicristatus (right)
Anhanguera	A. piscator		A nearly complete skeleton,	A pterodactyloid pterosaur	Anhanguera blittersdorffi Anhanguera piscator Cearadactylus atrox Kariridraco dianae Maaradactylus kellneri Tapejara wellnhoferi Thalassodromeus sethi Tropeognathus mesembrinus Tupuxuara leonardii (left) and Tupuxuara longicristatus (right)
Anhanguera	A. robustus			A pterodactyloid pterosaur	Anhanguera blittersdorffi Anhanguera piscator Cearadactylus atrox Kariridraco dianae Maaradactylus kellneri Tapejara wellnhoferi Thalassodromeus sethi Tropeognathus mesembrinus Tupuxuara leonardii (left) and Tupuxuara longicristatus (right)
Anhanguera	A. santanae			A pterodactyloid pterosaur	Anhanguera blittersdorffi Anhanguera piscator Cearadactylus atrox Kariridraco dianae Maaradactylus kellneri Tapejara wellnhoferi Thalassodromeus sethi Tropeognathus mesembrinus Tupuxuara leonardii (left) and Tupuxuara longicristatus (right)
Anhanguera	A. spielbergi			A pterodactyloid pterosaur	Anhanguera blittersdorffi Anhanguera piscator Cearadactylus atrox Kariridraco dianae Maaradactylus kellneri Tapejara wellnhoferi Thalassodromeus sethi Tropeognathus mesembrinus Tupuxuara leonardii (left) and Tupuxuara longicristatus (right)
Araripedactylus	A. dehmi		A single wing bone	A pterodactyloid pterosaur of uncertain affinities	Anhanguera blittersdorffi Anhanguera piscator Cearadactylus atrox Kariridraco dianae Maaradactylus kellneri Tapejara wellnhoferi Thalassodromeus sethi Tropeognathus mesembrinus Tupuxuara leonardii (left) and Tupuxuara longicristatus (right)
Araripesaurus	A. castilhoi		A partial wing, including distal fragments of the radius and ulna, carpals, all metacarpals and several digits	An ornithocheirid pterosaur	Anhanguera blittersdorffi Anhanguera piscator Cearadactylus atrox Kariridraco dianae Maaradactylus kellneri Tapejara wellnhoferi Thalassodromeus sethi Tropeognathus mesembrinus Tupuxuara leonardii (left) and Tupuxuara longicristatus (right)
Bakiribu	B. waridza		Two specimens originally thought to have consisted of fragmented upper and lower jaws. May have been parts of the gills of an indeterminate, potentially amiid fish.	Formerly classified as a ctenochasmatid pterosaur. May have been an indeterminate, potentially amiid ray finned fish.	Anhanguera blittersdorffi Anhanguera piscator Cearadactylus atrox Kariridraco dianae Maaradactylus kellneri Tapejara wellnhoferi Thalassodromeus sethi Tropeognathus mesembrinus Tupuxuara leonardii (left) and Tupuxuara longicristatus (right)
Barbosania	B. gracilirostris		An almost complete skeleton including the skull, that is partially articulated and uncompressed	A targaryendraconian pterosaur	Anhanguera blittersdorffi Anhanguera piscator Cearadactylus atrox Kariridraco dianae Maaradactylus kellneri Tapejara wellnhoferi Thalassodromeus sethi Tropeognathus mesembrinus Tupuxuara leonardii (left) and Tupuxuara longicristatus (right)
Brasileodactylus	B. araripensis		Several specimen consists of amandible, and the front of a snout and mandible. More complete fossils include a fragmentary skeleton and a skull, with mandible and proximal left wing.	An anhangueria pterosaur	Anhanguera blittersdorffi Anhanguera piscator Cearadactylus atrox Kariridraco dianae Maaradactylus kellneri Tapejara wellnhoferi Thalassodromeus sethi Tropeognathus mesembrinus Tupuxuara leonardii (left) and Tupuxuara longicristatus (right)
Cearadactylus	C. atrox				Anhanguera blittersdorffi Anhanguera piscator Cearadactylus atrox Kariridraco dianae Maaradactylus kellneri Tapejara wellnhoferi Thalassodromeus sethi Tropeognathus mesembrinus Tupuxuara leonardii (left) and Tupuxuara longicristatus (right)
Cearadactylus	"C." ligabuei				Anhanguera blittersdorffi Anhanguera piscator Cearadactylus atrox Kariridraco dianae Maaradactylus kellneri Tapejara wellnhoferi Thalassodromeus sethi Tropeognathus mesembrinus Tupuxuara leonardii (left) and Tupuxuara longicristatus (right)
Kariridraco	K. dianae		A fairly complete skull, including the lower jaws, and the first four neck vertebrae	A thalassodromid pterosaur	Anhanguera blittersdorffi Anhanguera piscator Cearadactylus atrox Kariridraco dianae Maaradactylus kellneri Tapejara wellnhoferi Thalassodromeus sethi Tropeognathus mesembrinus Tupuxuara leonardii (left) and Tupuxuara longicristatus (right)
Maaradactylus	M. kellneri		A skull	An anhanguerid pterodactyloid pterosaur	Anhanguera blittersdorffi Anhanguera piscator Cearadactylus atrox Kariridraco dianae Maaradactylus kellneri Tapejara wellnhoferi Thalassodromeus sethi Tropeognathus mesembrinus Tupuxuara leonardii (left) and Tupuxuara longicristatus (right)
Santanadactylus	S. brasilensis				Anhanguera blittersdorffi Anhanguera piscator Cearadactylus atrox Kariridraco dianae Maaradactylus kellneri Tapejara wellnhoferi Thalassodromeus sethi Tropeognathus mesembrinus Tupuxuara leonardii (left) and Tupuxuara longicristatus (right)
Santanadactylus	?S. pricei				Anhanguera blittersdorffi Anhanguera piscator Cearadactylus atrox Kariridraco dianae Maaradactylus kellneri Tapejara wellnhoferi Thalassodromeus sethi Tropeognathus mesembrinus Tupuxuara leonardii (left) and Tupuxuara longicristatus (right)
Santanadactylus	S. spixi				Anhanguera blittersdorffi Anhanguera piscator Cearadactylus atrox Kariridraco dianae Maaradactylus kellneri Tapejara wellnhoferi Thalassodromeus sethi Tropeognathus mesembrinus Tupuxuara leonardii (left) and Tupuxuara longicristatus (right)
Tapejara	T. wellnhoferi		Several holotypes consist of a partial skull, a partial mandible (lower jaw), and an anterior (front) cervical (neck) vertebra.	A tapejarid pterosaur	Anhanguera blittersdorffi Anhanguera piscator Cearadactylus atrox Kariridraco dianae Maaradactylus kellneri Tapejara wellnhoferi Thalassodromeus sethi Tropeognathus mesembrinus Tupuxuara leonardii (left) and Tupuxuara longicristatus (right)
Thalassodromeus	T. sethi		A large skull	A large thalassodromid pterosaur	Anhanguera blittersdorffi Anhanguera piscator Cearadactylus atrox Kariridraco dianae Maaradactylus kellneri Tapejara wellnhoferi Thalassodromeus sethi Tropeognathus mesembrinus Tupuxuara leonardii (left) and Tupuxuara longicristatus (right)
Tropeognathus	T. mesembrinus		Several holotypes consist of a skull with mandibles, a partial mandible and skeleton with extensive elements of all body parts, except the tail and the lower hindlimbs.	A tropeognathinae pterosaur	Anhanguera blittersdorffi Anhanguera piscator Cearadactylus atrox Kariridraco dianae Maaradactylus kellneri Tapejara wellnhoferi Thalassodromeus sethi Tropeognathus mesembrinus Tupuxuara leonardii (left) and Tupuxuara longicristatus (right)
Tupuxuara	T. deliradamus		A skull	A thalassodromid pterosaur	Anhanguera blittersdorffi Anhanguera piscator Cearadactylus atrox Kariridraco dianae Maaradactylus kellneri Tapejara wellnhoferi Thalassodromeus sethi Tropeognathus mesembrinus Tupuxuara leonardii (left) and Tupuxuara longicristatus (right)
Tupuxuara	T. leonardii			A thalassodromid pterosaur	Anhanguera blittersdorffi Anhanguera piscator Cearadactylus atrox Kariridraco dianae Maaradactylus kellneri Tapejara wellnhoferi Thalassodromeus sethi Tropeognathus mesembrinus Tupuxuara leonardii (left) and Tupuxuara longicristatus (right)
Tupuxuara	T. longicristatus			A thalassodromid pterosaur	Anhanguera blittersdorffi Anhanguera piscator Cearadactylus atrox Kariridraco dianae Maaradactylus kellneri Tapejara wellnhoferi Thalassodromeus sethi Tropeognathus mesembrinus Tupuxuara leonardii (left) and Tupuxuara longicristatus (right)
Unwindia	U. trigonus		A partial skull consisting of only the fused premaxillae and maxillae, some teeth and parts of the palate	A pterodactyloid pterosaur	Anhanguera blittersdorffi Anhanguera piscator Cearadactylus atrox Kariridraco dianae Maaradactylus kellneri Tapejara wellnhoferi Thalassodromeus sethi Tropeognathus mesembrinus Tupuxuara leonardii (left) and Tupuxuara longicristatus (right)

=== Turtles ===
Turtles of the Romualdo Formation
Genus	Species	Presence	Marterials	Notes	Images
Araripemys	A. barretoi		A shell	An araripemydidae turtle	
Brasilemys	B. josai				
Cearachelys	C. placidoi		A shell	A bothremydinae pleurodiran turtle	
Caririemys	C. violetae			A Euraxemydidae turtle	
Euraxemys	E. essweini				
Santanachelys	S. gaffneyi			A protostegidae sea turtle	

=== Fish ===
- Araripelepidotes temnurus
- Axelrodichthys araripensis
- Beurlenichthys ouricuriensis
- Brannerion latum
- Dentilepisosteus laevis
- Calamopleurus cylindricus
- Cladocyclus gardneri
- Enneles audax
- Iemanja palma
- Lepidotes wenzai
- Microdon penalvai
- Notelops brama
- Obaichthys decoratus
- Oshunia brevis
- Placidichthys bidorsalis
- Rhacolepis buccalis
- Iansan beurleni
- Santanaclupea silvasantosi
- Tharrhias araripis
- Tribodus limae
- Vinctifer comptoni; V. longirostris; V. araripinensis

== See also ==
- List of fossil sites (with link directory)
- List of dinosaur-bearing rock formations
- Araripe Basin
- Cerro Barcino Formation
- Elrhaz Formation
- Guarujá Formation
- Itapecuru Formation
- Mata Amarilla Formation
