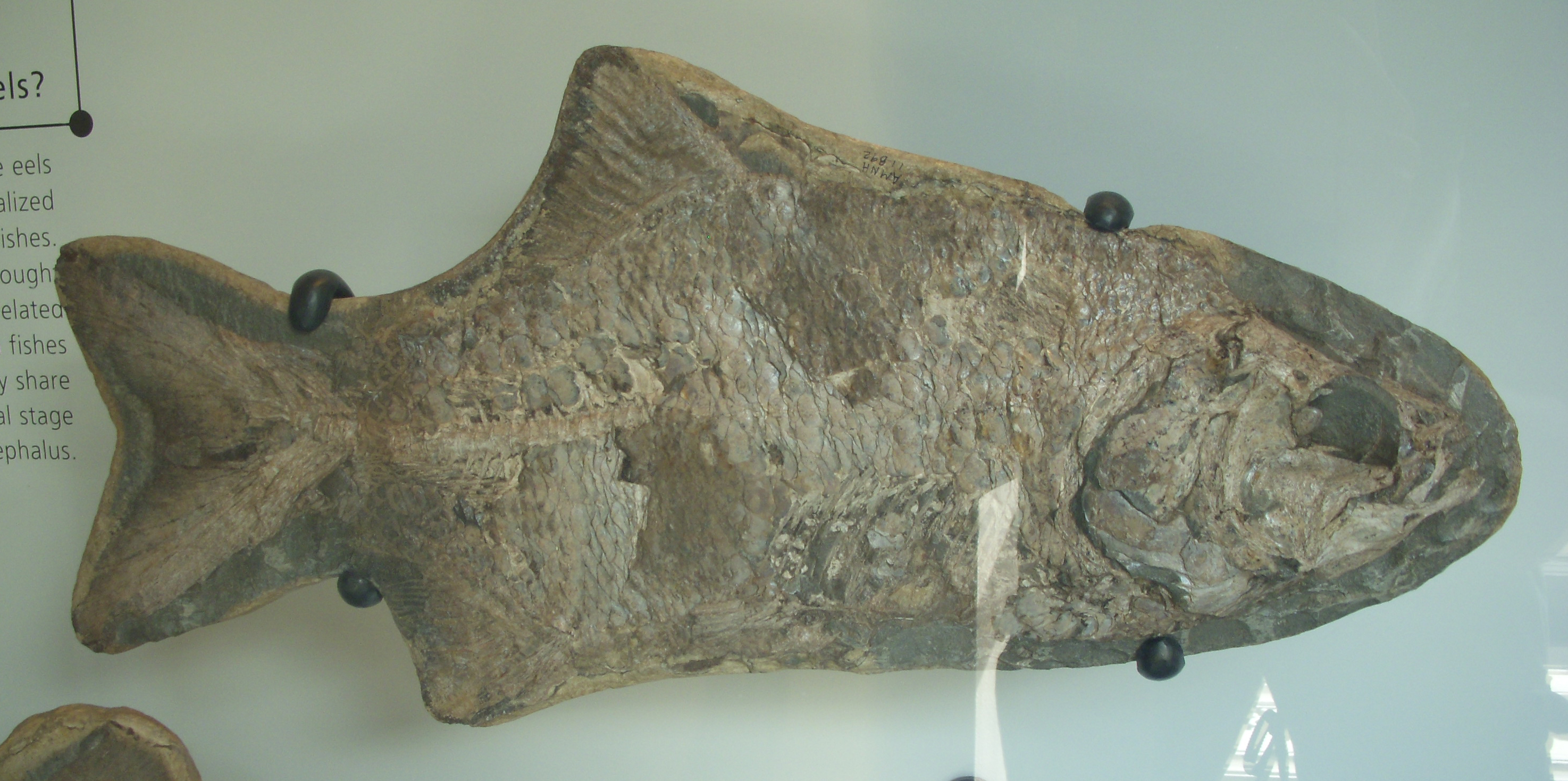
- Brannerion sp. (AMNH 11892)

Scientific classification
- Kingdom: Animalia
- Phylum: Chordata
- Class: Actinopterygii
- Order: Albuliformes
- Suborder: Albuloidei
- Genus: †Brannerion; Jordan, 1920

Species
- †B. latum (Agassiz, 1841); †B. vestitum (Jordan & Branner, 1908)

= Brannerion =

Brannerion Temporal range: Late Aptian

Extinct genus of fishes

Brannerion is an extinct genus of prehistoric marine bonefish. Fossils of the genus were found in the Romualdo Formation of the Santana Group, Araripe Basin, northeastern Brazil. It is considered a basal member of the Albuliformes.

It contains the following species:

- †B. latum (Agassiz, 1841) (syn: Rhacolepis latus Agassiz,1841)
- †B. vestitum (Jordan & Branner, 1908) (syn: Calamopleurus vestitus Jordan & Branner, 1908)

It is common species in some localities, but is known to be rare in others. In localities where it is rare, it is only known from layers dominated by the gonorhynchiform fish Tharrhias.

It was named by David Starr Jordan after his colleague, geologist John Casper Branner, who also helped in describing the species C. vestitus, which was later assigned to the genus.

== See also ==
- Prehistoric fish
- List of prehistoric bony fish
