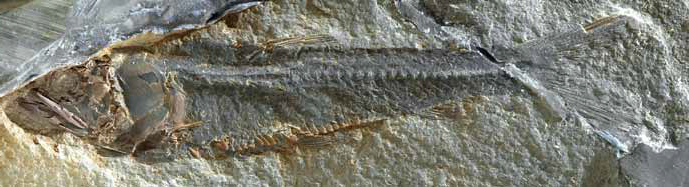

Scientific classification
- Domain: Eukaryota
- Kingdom: Animalia
- Phylum: Chordata
- Class: Actinopterygii
- Order: Clupeiformes
- Genus: †Santanaclupea; Maisey, 1993

Type species
- †Santanaclupea silvasantosi Maisey, 1993

= Santanaclupea =

Santanaclupea Temporal range: Aptian

Extinct genus of fishes

Santanaclupea is an extinct genus of clupeiform fish from the Romualdo Formation (formerly a member of the then Santana Formation, now Santana Group) of Brazil. It is named after Santana do Cariri, the town that the Santana Formation is named after and Clupea, Latin for small river fish. The type species of the genus is Santanaclupea silvasantosi, which was named in honor of Prof. Rubens de Silva Santos.
