= Araripe Basin =

Rift Basin in brazil famous for its pterosaur fossils

- Bacia do Araripe
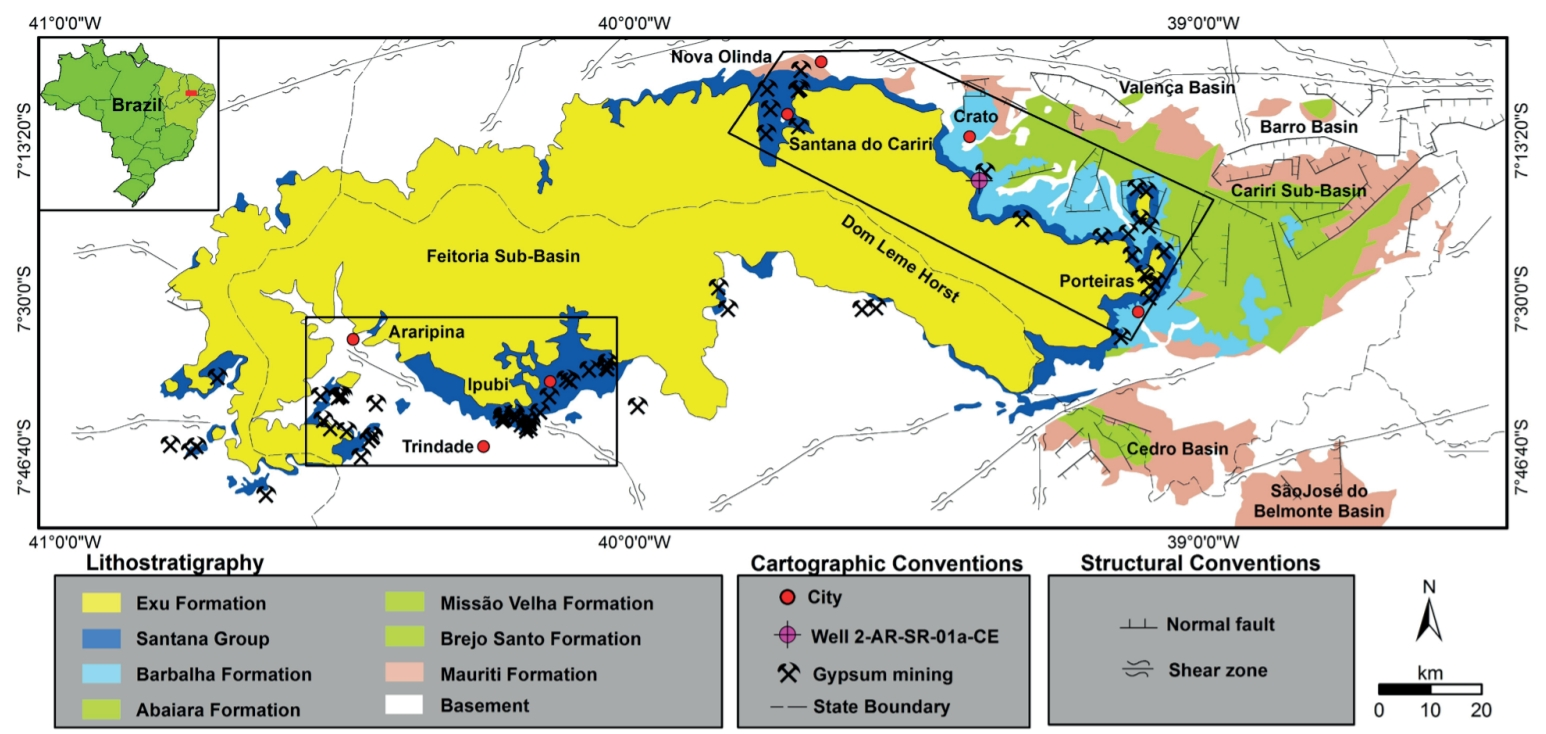
- Geologic map of the Araripe Basin

- Location within Brazil

- Outline of the Chapada do Araripe in the basin
- Coordinates: 7°23′12″S 40°9′11″W
- Etymology: Chapada do Araripe
- Location: South America
- Region: Northeast
- Country: Brazil
- States: Ceará, Pernambuco, Piauí
- Cities: Crato, Ceará

Characteristics
- On/Offshore: Onshore
- Boundaries: Patos & Pernambuco lineaments
- Part of: Brazilian onshore basins
- Area: ~8,000 km^{2} (3,100 sq mi)

Geology
- Basin type: Rift basin
- Plate: South American
- Orogeny: Break-up of Gondwana
- Age: Middle Jurassic-Albian
- Stratigraphy: Stratigraphy

The Araripe Basin (Portuguese: Bacia do Araripe) is a rift basin covering about 8,000 square kilometres (3,100 sq mi), in Ceará, Piauí and Pernambuco states of northeastern Brazil. It is bounded by the Patos and Pernambuco lineaments, and is situated east of the Parnaíba Basin, southwest of the Rio do Peixe Basin and northwest of the Tucano and Jatobá Basins.

The basin has provided a variety of unique fossils in the Crato and Santana Formations and includes the Araripe Geopark, a member of the UNESCO Global Geoparks since 2006. The pterosaurs Araripesaurus and Araripedactylus (now considered a nomen dubium), crocodylian Araripesuchus, the turtle Araripemys, amphibian Arariphrynus, the fish Araripelepidotes and the insect Araripenymphes were named after the basin. The bituminous shales of the Ipubi Formation in the Araripe Basin have potential for shale gas development.

== Basin history ==
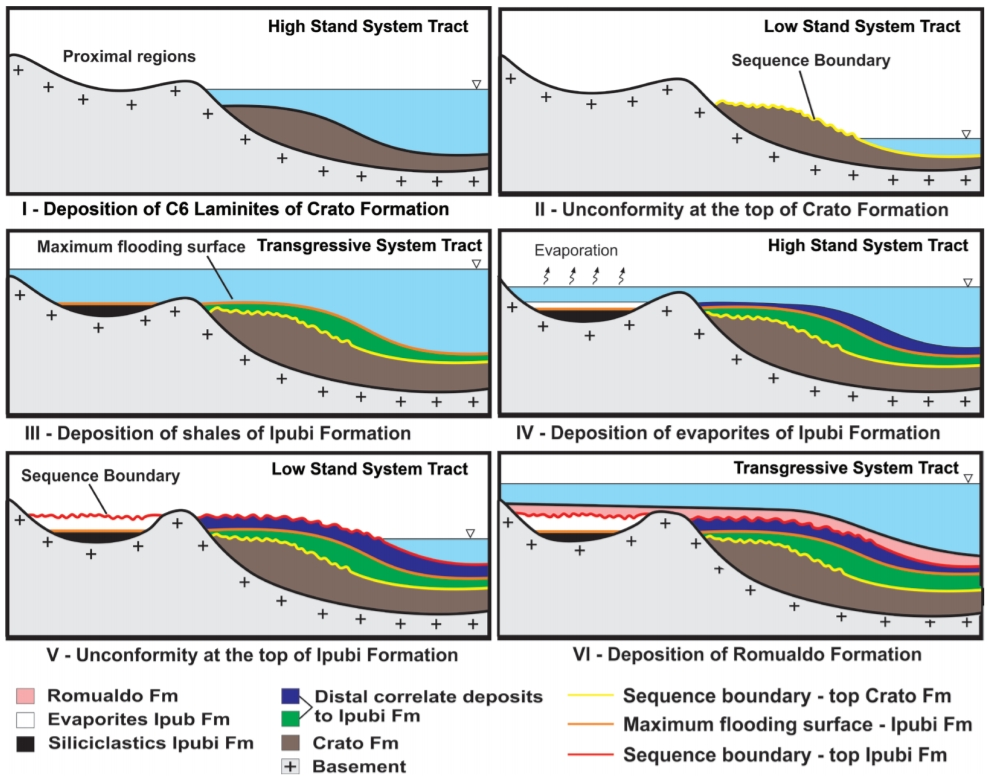
Schematic development of the depositional environments of the Santana Group

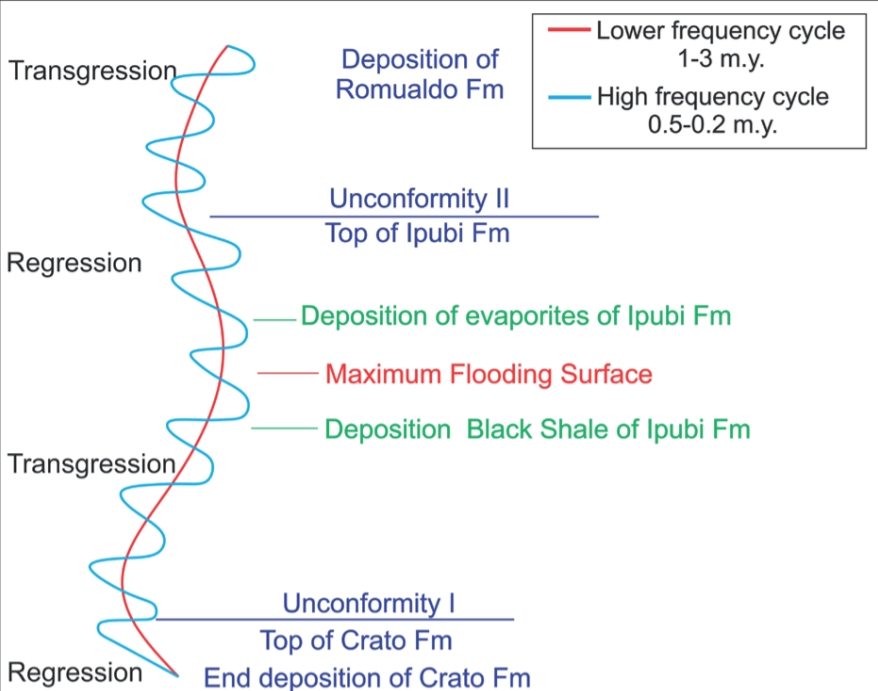
Lake level cyclicity in the Santana Group

The tectono-sedimentary evolution of the Araripe Basin, located in the Borborema Geologic Province, encompasses four stages, with five tectonostratigraphic phases:
1) Syneclise phase - Silurian to Devonian - characterized by tectonic quiescence in the Borborema Province. It is represented by the deposits of the Cariri Formation, that include medium to coarse-grained quartz sandstones, locally conglomeratic, deposited in large braided fluvial systems
2) Pre-rift phase - Tithonian - characterized by the mechanical subsidence due to lithosphere thinning that preceded the rift. It is represented by the Brejo Santo Formation, that comprises red shales and claystones, and the Missão Velha Formation, constituted by medium to coarse-grained quartz-feldspathic sandstones, locally conglomeratic, that contains entire trunks and fragments of silicified wood (Dadoxilon benderi) conifer
3) Rift phase - Berriasian to Hauterivian - characterized by increasing mechanical subsidence that created a system of grabens and half grabens. It is represented by the Abaiara Formation, that includes shales, siltstones, sandstones and conglomerates
4) Post-Rift I phase - Aptian to Albian - characterized by thermal subsidence. The lowermost unit Barbalha Formation, represents a fluviolacustrine phase and is composed of red and gray shales, siltstones and claystones.

The Santana Group was formed during this stage and comprises three stratigraphic units:

- Crato Formation that is composed of six intervals of laminated limestones (C1 to C6), interbedded with calciferous siltstones and marls, and is very rich in fossils of vertebrate and invertebrate organisms
- Ipubi Formation, that is mainly composed of organic-rich, black greenish bituminous shales, claystones and algal limestones that are interbedded with gypsum-anhydrite beds
- Romualdo Formation, that represents a calciferous siliciclastic succession composed of fine to medium-grained sandstones, argillaceous siltstones, calciferous shales, and limestones, very rich in fossils. This formation recorded the marine proto-Atlantic incursion that involved the Araripe Basin, and other interior basins and created a large seaway throughout the Borborema Province during the Albian

5) Post-rift II phase - Albian to Cenomanian - characterized by a major sag phase, and is formed by two stratigraphic units:

- Araripina Formation, that occurs in the western region of the basin and is composed by rhythmites and heterolithic layers of reddish, purplish and yellowish fine-grained sandstone and mudstone
- Exu Formation, that comprises medium-to coarse grained sandstones, fine grained clayey sandstones and local conglomeratic beds

== Stratigraphy ==
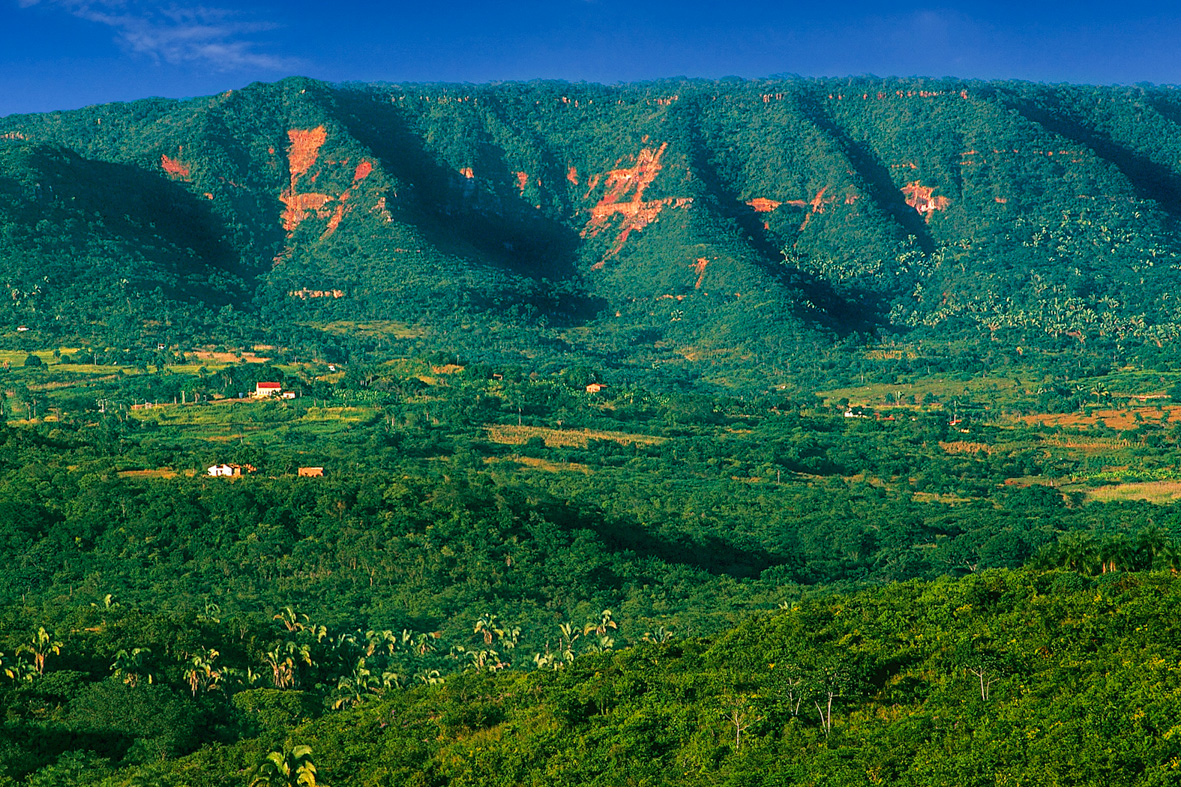
Chapada do Araripe

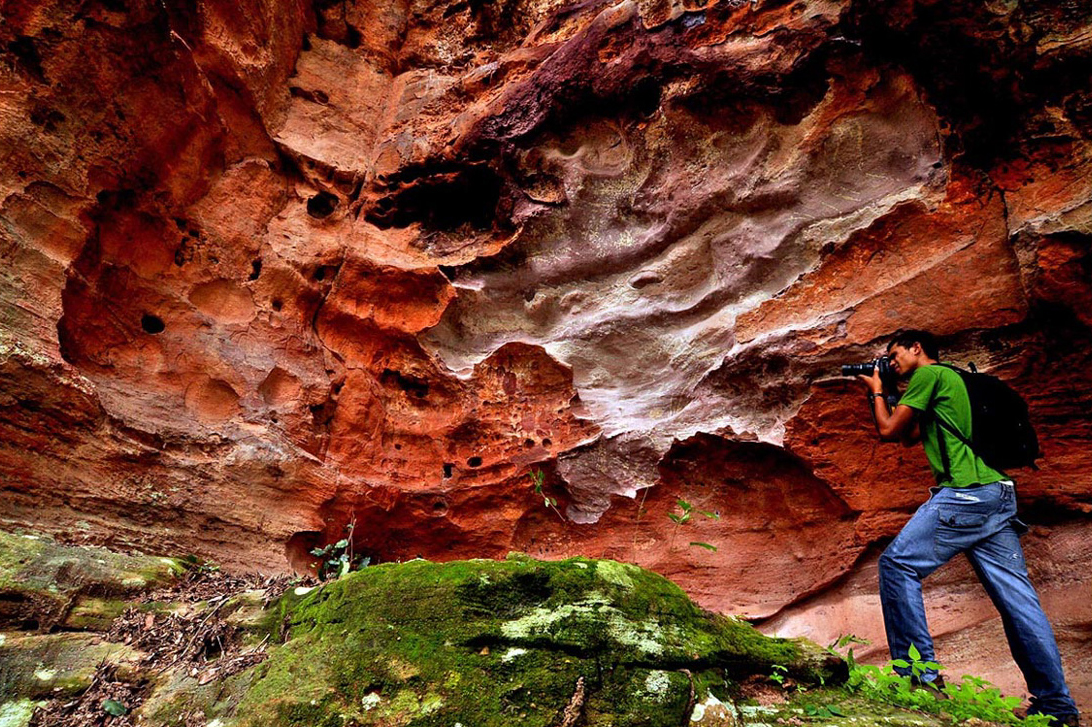
Outcrop in the Araripe Basin

Age	Group	Formation	Sequence	Notes
Cenozoic	alluvium			
Albian	Araripe	Exu	Post-rift	
Albian	Araripe	Arajara	Post-rift	
Albian	Araripe	Araripina	Post-rift	
Albian; Aptian	Santana	Romualdo	Post-rift	
Albian; Aptian	Santana	Ipubi	Post-rift	
Albian; Aptian	Santana	Crato	Post-rift	
Albian; Aptian	Araripe	Barbalha/Rio da Batateira	Post-rift	
Early Cretaceous	Vale do Carirí	Abaiara	Pre- and syn-rift	
Early Cretaceous	Vale do Carirí	Missão Velha	Pre- and syn-rift	
Late Jurassic	Vale do Carirí	Missão Velha	Pre- and syn-rift	
Late Jurassic	Vale do Carirí	Brejo Santo	Pre- and syn-rift	
Middle Jurassic	Vale do Carirí	Brejo Santo	Pre- and syn-rift	
Early Jurassic	hiatus			
Triassic	hiatus			
Permian	hiatus			
Carboniferous	hiatus			
Devonian	Paleozoic sequence	Mauriti; Mucuri	Pre-rift	
Silurian	Paleozoic sequence	Mauriti; Mucuri	Pre-rift	
Ordovician	hiatus			
Cambrian	hiatus			
Precambrian	Basement			

== See also ==
- Chapada do Araripe
- Paraná Basin
- Santos Basin
