= Araripe Geopark =

Geopark in Brazil

- Geoparque Araripe
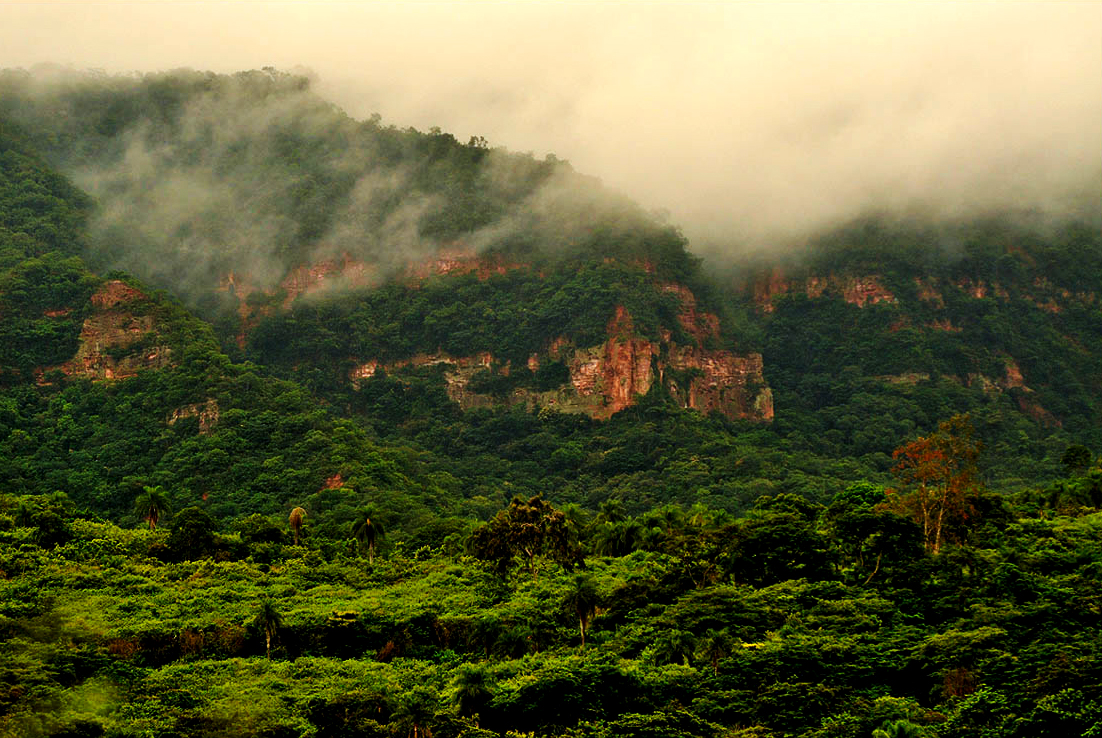
- Araripe-Apodi National Forest

- Location within Brazil
- Interactive map of Araripe Geopark
- Location: Ceará, Brazil
- Nearest city: Crato, Juazeiro do Norte
- Coordinates: 7°14′S 39°24′W
- Area: 3,796 km^{2} (1,466 sq mi)
- Designation: UNESCO Global Geopark
- Established: 2006
- Governing body: Government of the State of Ceará and University of Cariri
- Website: www.geoparkararipe.org.br

The Araripe Geopark is a geopark in the southern region of the state of Ceará in Northeastern Brazil. It was the first geopark in Brazil to be recognized by UNESCO. The geopark covers an area of 3,796 km² across six municipalities –Barbalha, Crato, Juazeiro do Norte, Missão Velha, Nova Olinda, and Santana do Cariri. The park contains a large concentration of pterosaur fossils from the Cretaceous era, making it as a global Lagerstätte site.

== History and Recognition ==
The Araripe Sedimentary Basin, where the entirety of the park is located, was formed from the splitting of Pangea. Before the designation of a geopark, indigenous people, specifically the Cariri people, lived in the Chapada do Araripe area where the park stands today.

In 1946, the Brazilian government established Floresta Nacional do Araripe (FLONA) (National Forest of Araripe) to recognized the importance of the area. The chapada was later protected under the Environmental Protection Area status given to the park in 1997 that included 38 municipalities (including the six municipalities that made up the park). In 2005, the Government of Ceará applied to UNESCO to become a member of the Global Network of National Geoparks. The park was officially accepted the next year.

In 2015, UNESCO designated the park as a UNESCO Global Geoparks.

== Geological and paleontological importance ==
One of the first fossil works here were carried out by Friedrich Philipp von Martius and Johann Baptist von Spix in the early 19th century. Interest grew after multiple species fossils were found in the area including Calamopleurus cylindricus, Cladocyclus gardneri, Lepidotes temnurus, Notelops brama, Rhacolepis buccalis, Rhacolepis latus, and Vinctifer comptoni by George Gardner and published by Louis Agassiz.

In the 1940s Brazilian researchers including Rubens da Silva Santos, Llewellyn Ivor Price, and Karl Beurlen condicted explorations. Among known fossils found are five carbonate nodules with the fossil fishes of the species Vinctifer comptoni collected by João da Sylva Feijó which are housed in the Lisbon Academy of Sciences.

== Geosites ==
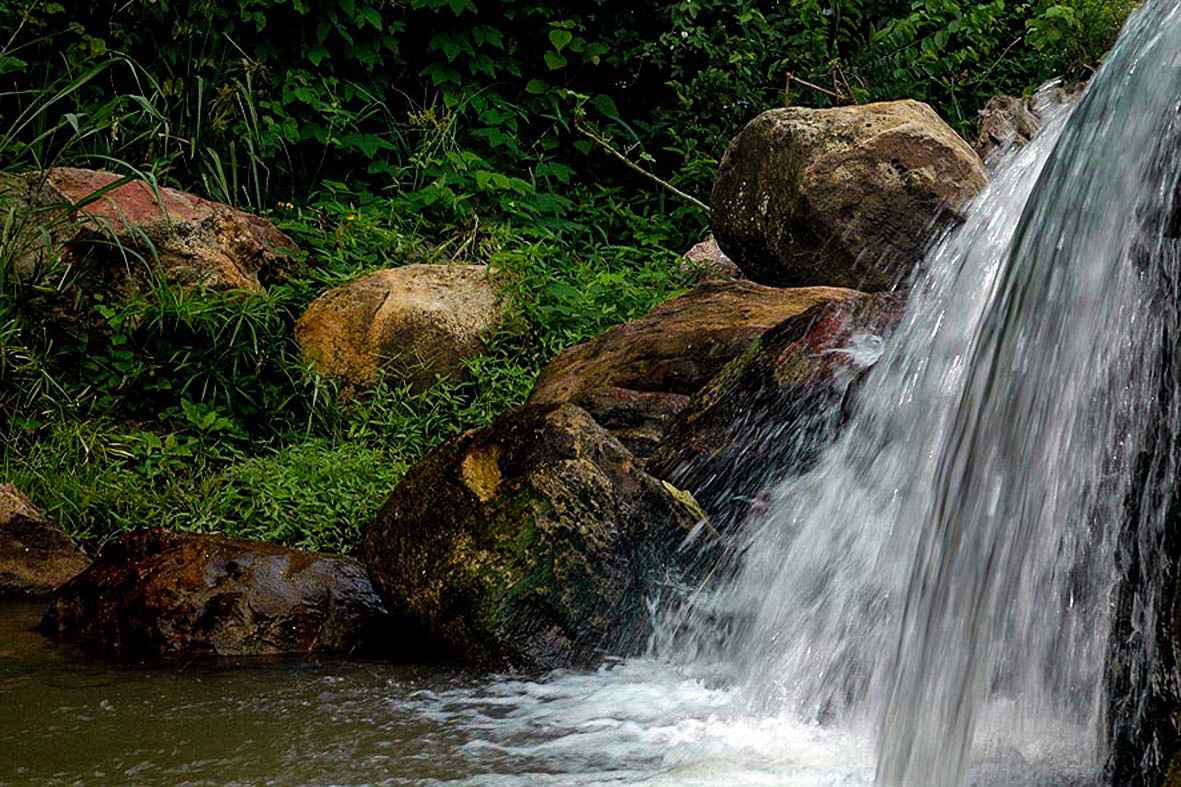
View of a waterfall in the Chapada do Araripe

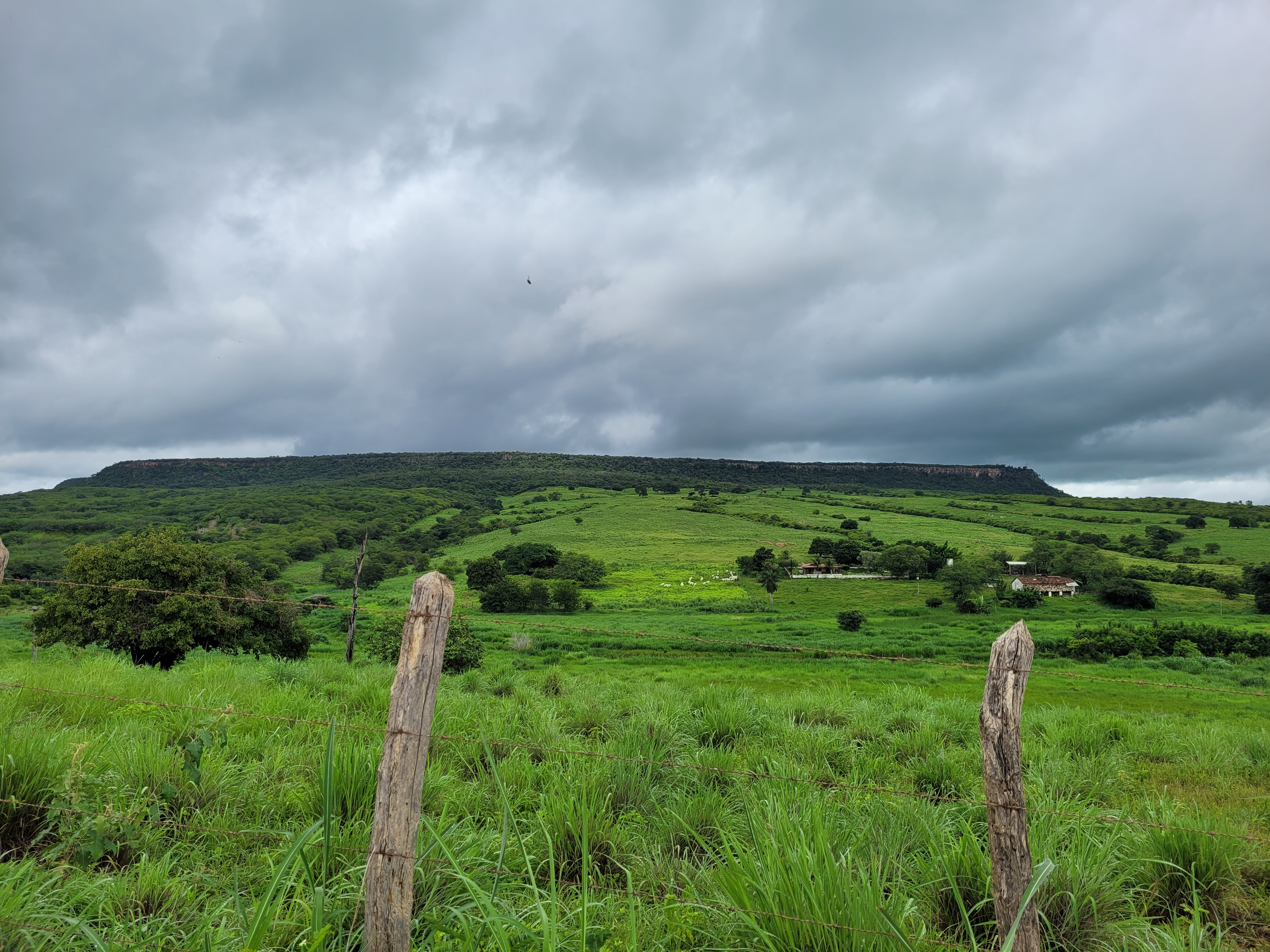
The plateau from afar

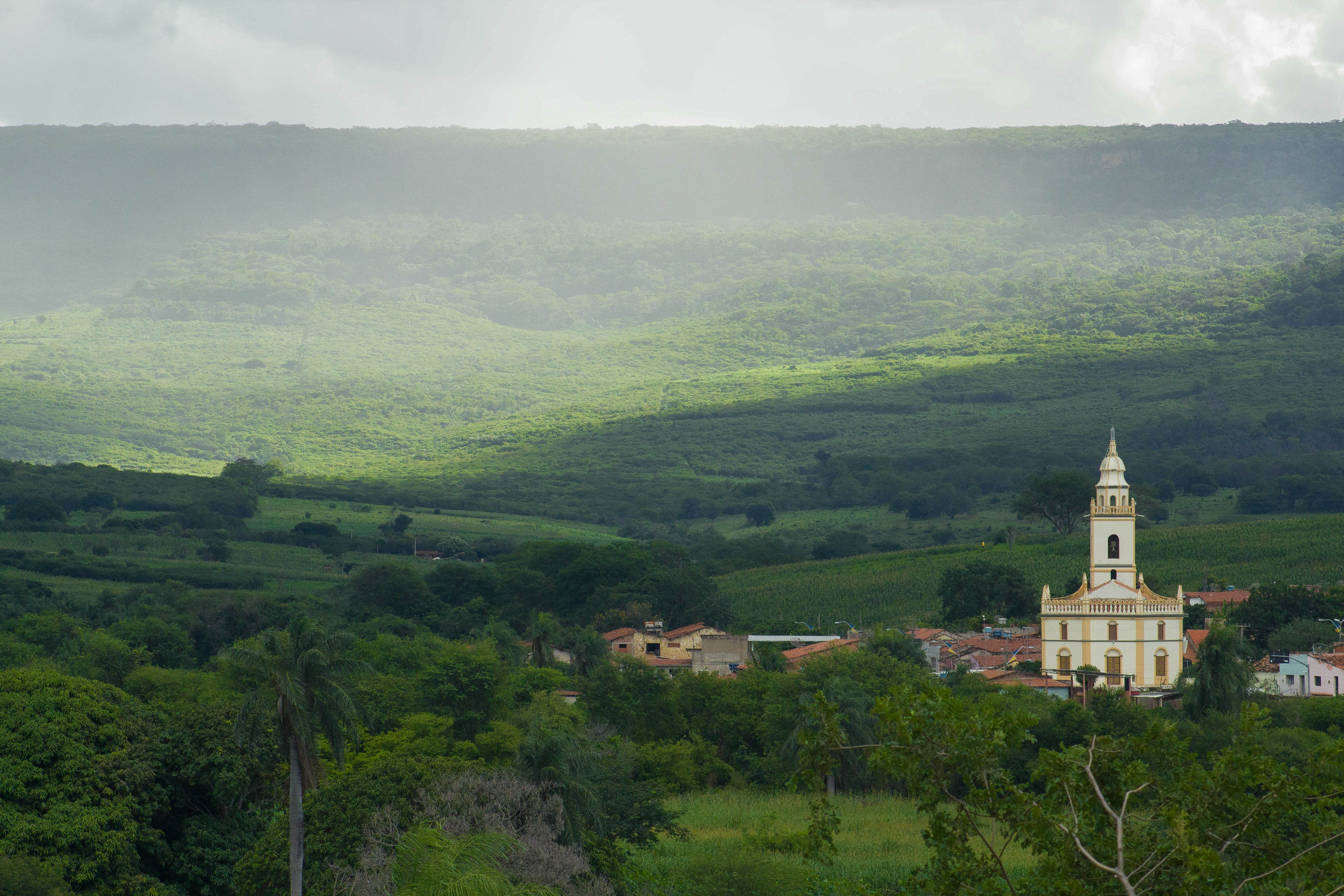

The Araripe Geopark has nine geosites across the park:

- Parque do Pterossauros
- Floresta Petrificada do Cariri
- Colina do Horto
- Ponte de Pedra
- Cachoeira de Missão Velha
- Pontal de Santa Cruz
- Riacho do Meio
- Batateiras
- Pedra Cariri

== Fossils smuggling incidents ==
Between 1998 and 2008, Ceará authorities seized 32,728 stolen fossils which were to be sold to collectors, researchers, universities and museums in countries such as United States, Germany, the United Kingdom, France and Spain.

Federal authorities launched Operation Munich in 2012 which focused on seizing back fossils which were stolen. The operation was able to seize back thousands of fossils in limestone slabs (which include a pterosaur fossil, Tupandactylus navigans) which were being smuggled out of Brazil and addressed to muesuems in Britain and Germany.

In 2018, pterosaur fossils from the basin were smuggled to France and Germany in which Brazilian authorities requested the fossils to be extradiated back home. Brazil also requested investigations for fossils which were taken to the United States, Italy and Japan.

45 fossils were given back to Brazil from France after a legal battle between the two, after investigation began 5 years prior.

In October of 2020, authorities launched "Operation Santana Raptor" in the northern Chapada do Araripe region and targeted businessmen, civil servants, and middlemen who helped with the fossil trafficking.

On 24 May 2022, French customs officers returned 998 fossils after they were seized in 2013 at port of Le Havre.

The Ubirajara jubatus fossil specimen obtained in the 1990s from the Araripe Basin was returned to Brazil after two-years of negotiations in 2023.
