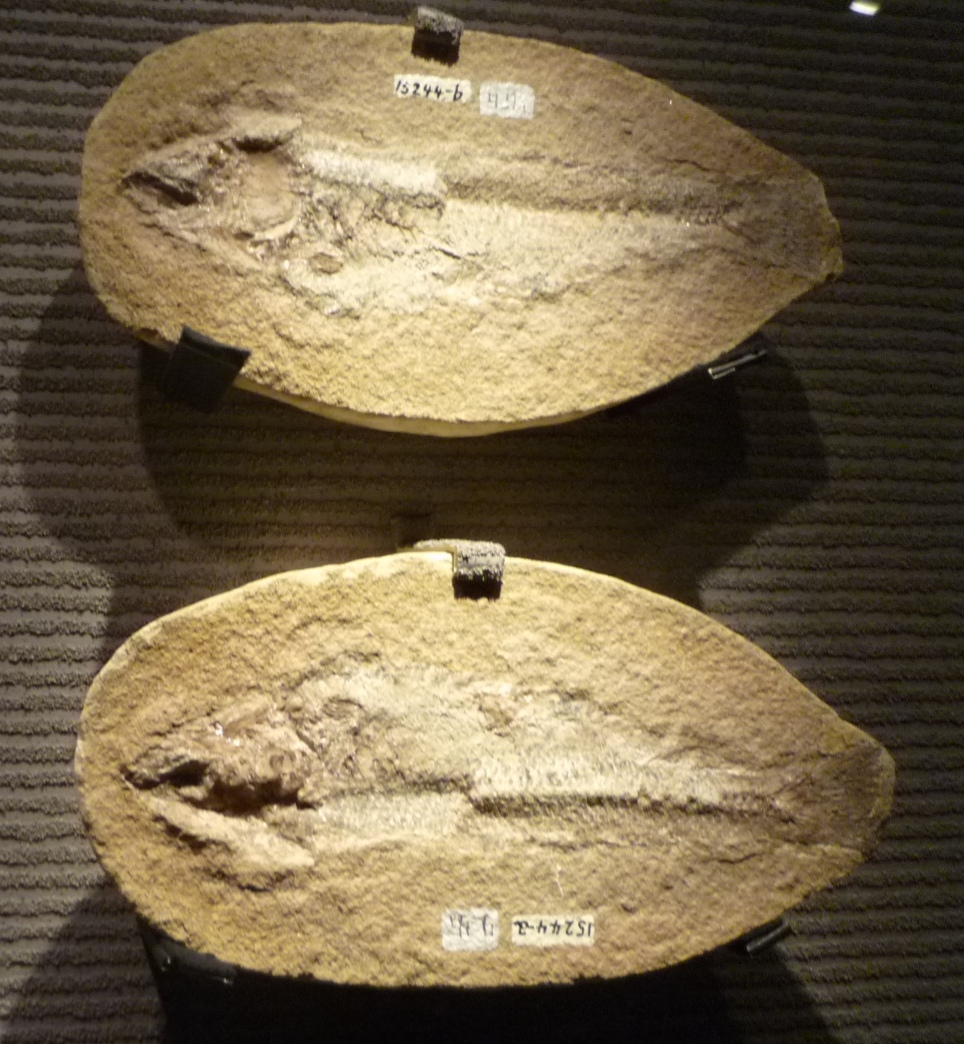
- Tharrhias araripis fossil in National Museum of Nature and Science

Scientific classification
- Kingdom: Animalia
- Phylum: Chordata
- Class: Actinopterygii
- Order: Gonorynchiformes
- Genus: †Tharrhias; Jordan & Branner, 1908

Type species
- †Tharrhias araripis Jordan & Branner, 1908

= Tharrhias =

Tharrhias Temporal range: Aptian ~125–112 Ma

Extinct genus of prehistoric bony fish

Tharrhias is an extinct genus of prehistoric bony fish that lived during the Aptian stage of the Early Cretaceous epoch. The type species T. araripis is named after the Araripe Basin, in which it was found in sediments of the Santana Formation.

Crab prezoea larvae have been found fossilised in the stomach contents of Tharrhias.

== See also ==
- Prehistoric fish
- List of prehistoric bony fish
