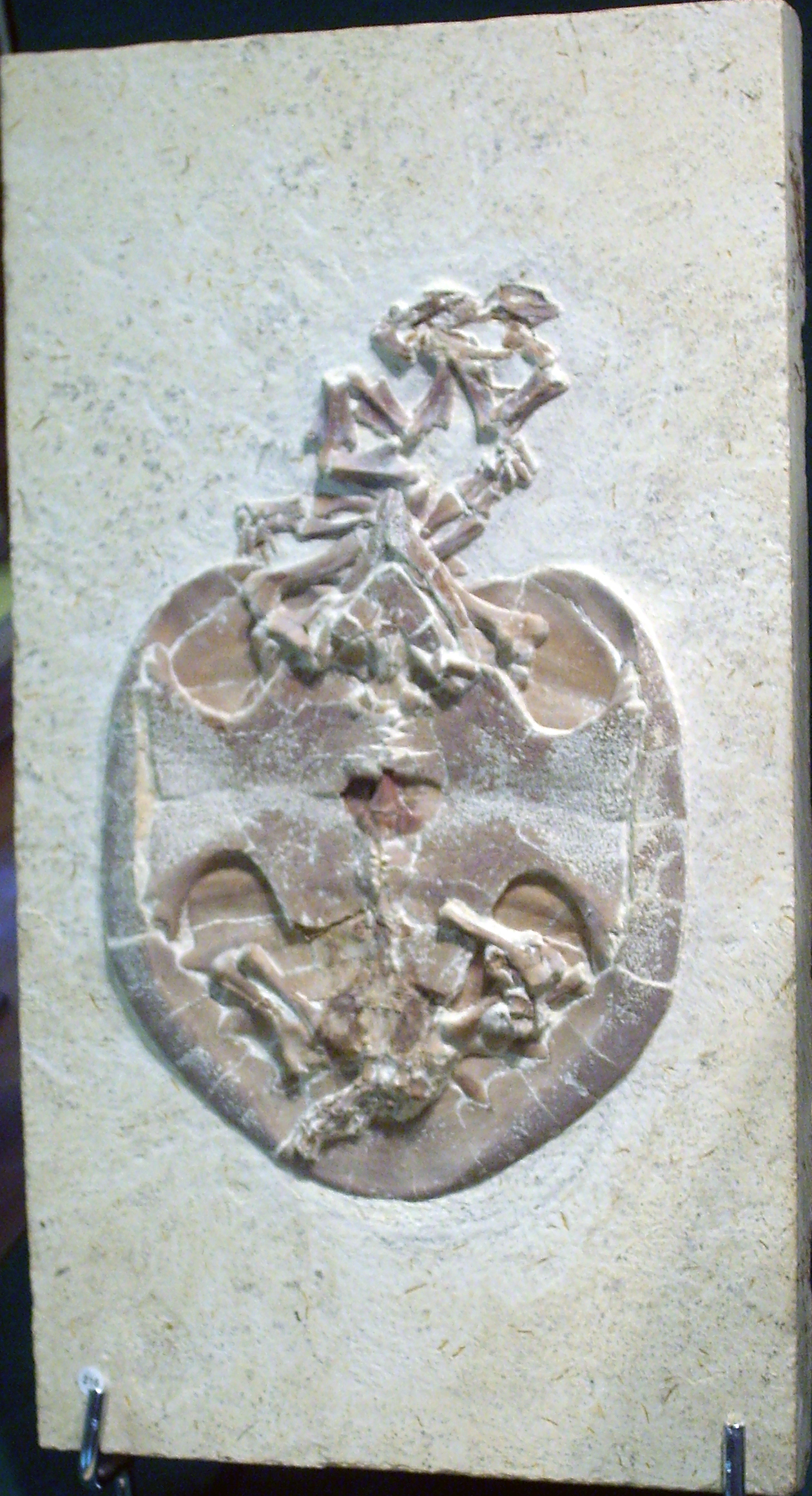

Scientific classification
- Domain: Eukaryota
- Kingdom: Animalia
- Phylum: Chordata
- Class: Reptilia
- Order: Testudines
- Suborder: Pleurodira
- Family: †Araripemydidae
- Genus: †Araripemys; Price, 1973
- Species: †A. barretoi

Binomial name
- †Araripemys barretoi Price, 1973

= Araripemys =

Araripemys Temporal range: Albian ~112.6–109.0 Ma

Extinct genus of turtles

Araripemys is an extinct marine turtle genus from 112 to 109 million years ago, in the Early Cretaceous Crato and Romualdo Formations of the Araripe Basin in northeastern Brazil. It is one of the oldest known pleurodires.

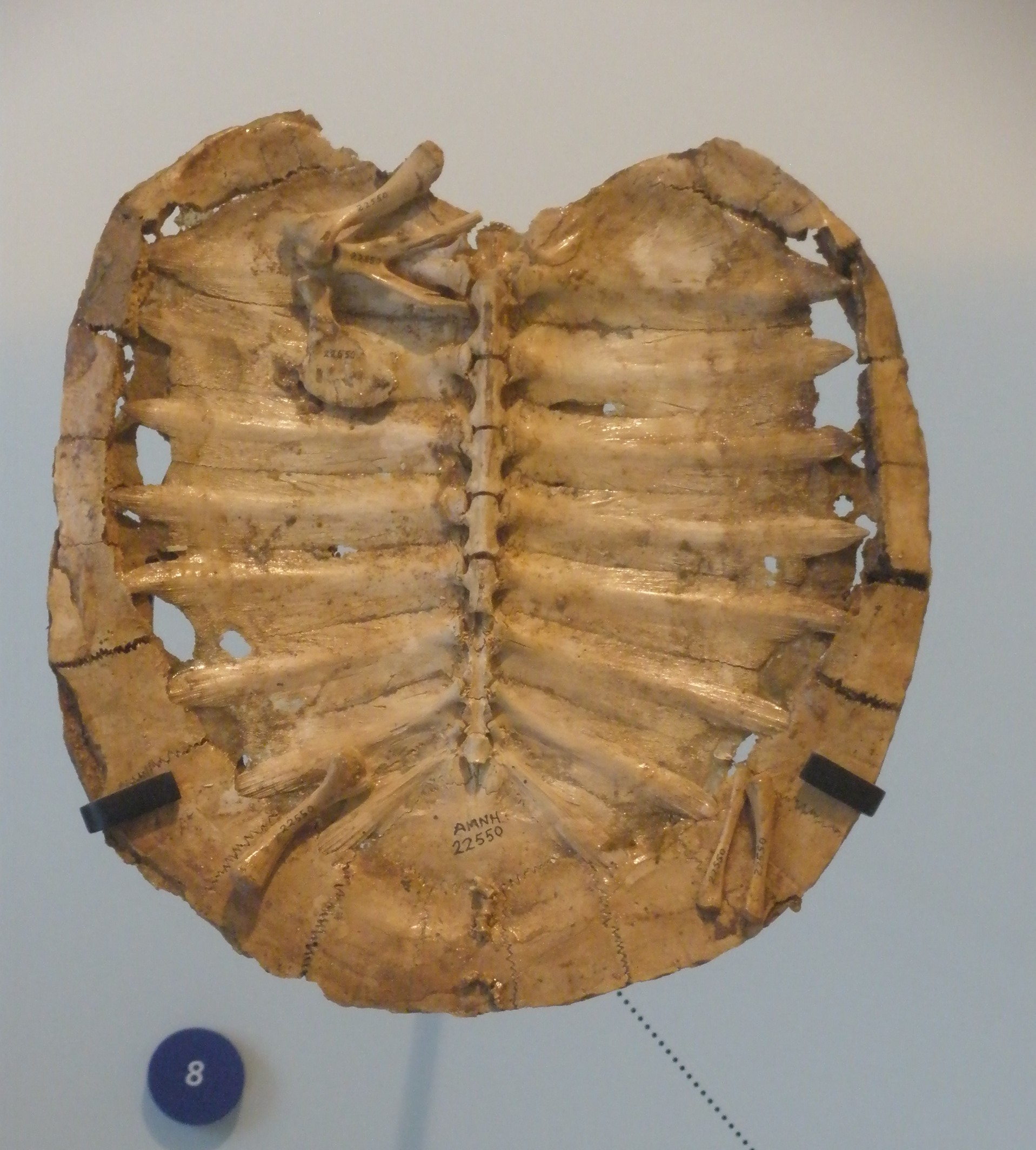
Araripemys barretoi
