= Missão Velha Formation =

Geologic formation in Brazil

- Stratigraphic range: Late Jurassic; ~170–145 Ma
- Type: Geological formation
- Unit of: Vale do Carirí Group
- Underlies: Abaiara Formation
- Overlies: Breto Santo Formation
- Thickness: 100–200 m (330–660 ft)

Lithology
- Primary: Sandstone

Location
- Coordinates: 7.3°S 39.1°W
- Approximate paleocoordinates: 7.1°S 6.5°W
- Region: Pernambuco, Piauí & Ceará
- Country: Brazil
- Extent: Araripe Basin
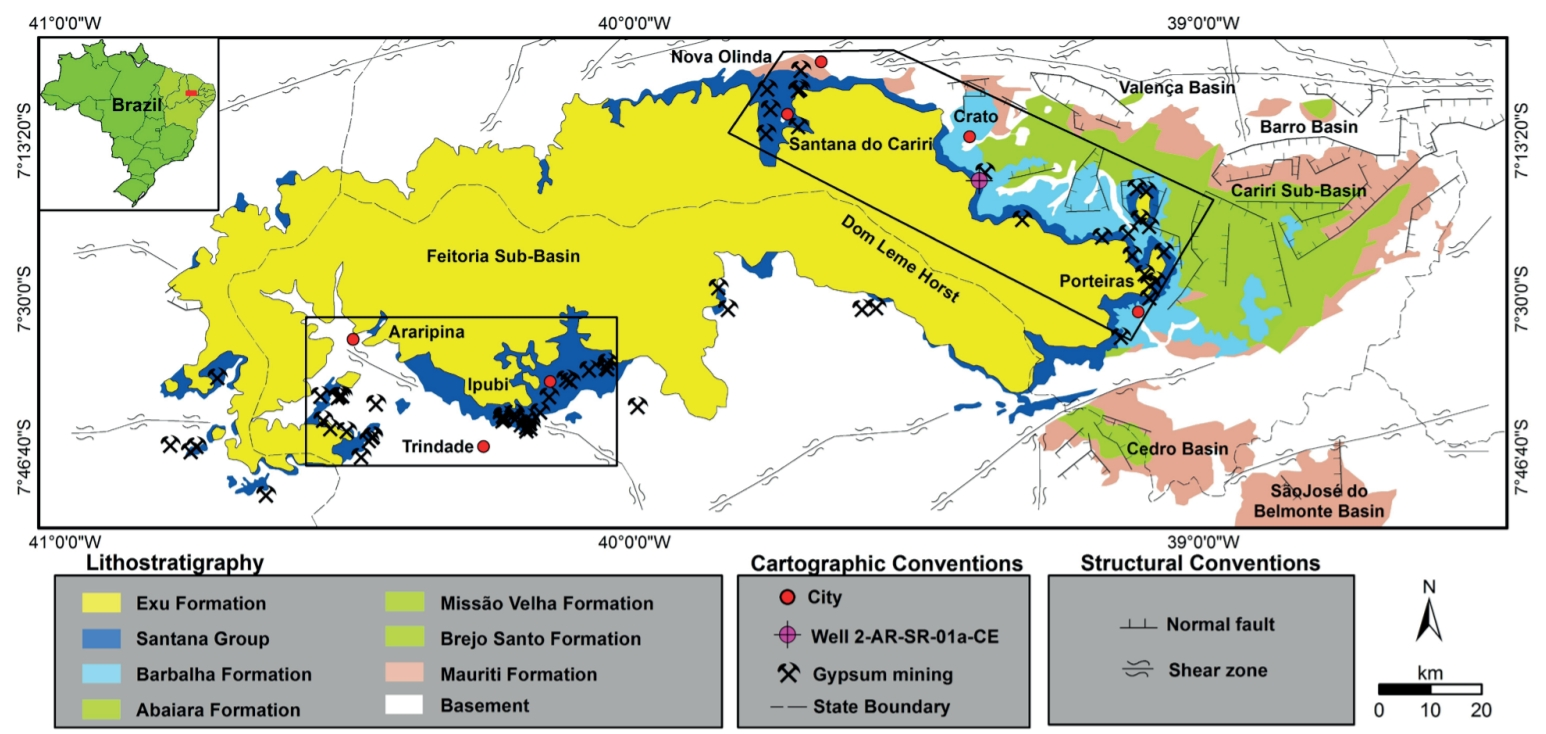
- Map of the Araripe Basin with the Missão Velha Formation in green

The Missão Velha Formation is a late Jurassic geologic formation in northeastern Brazil's Araripe Basin where the states of Pernambuco, Piauí and Ceará come together. The formation is the middle stratigraphic unit of the Vale do Carirí Group, overlying the Brejo Santo Formation and overlain by the Abaiara Formation.

The formation comprises whitish fine-to-medium quartzose arenites, with subrounded to rounded grains, deposited in an alluvial fan environment during the syn-rift phase of the Araripe Basin.

The Missão Velha Formation has provided macrofossils of various genera of fish and reptiles as snakes, crocodylomorphs and turtles. Ichnofossils of dinosaurs were also discovered in the formation, as well as a tooth from an abelisaurid theropod.

== Fossil content ==
The following fossils were reported from the formation:

- Fish
  - Parvodus rugianus
  - Planohybodus peterboroughensis
  - Planohybodus marki
  - Mawsonia cf. gigas
  - Acrodus sp.
  - Hybodus sp.
  - Lepidotes sp.
  - Neoceratodus sp.
  - Polyacrodus sp.
  - Vinctifer sp.
  - Lonchidiidae indet.
- Reptiles
  - Turtles
    - Pelomedusidae indet.
  - Dinosaurs
    - Sauropoda indet.
    - Theropoda indet.
    - Abelisauridae indet.
  - Loricata
    - Mesosuchia indet.
  - Snakes
    - Lacertilia indet.
- Amphibians
  - ?Amphibia indet.
- Ichnofossils
  - Carnosauria indet.
  - Ornithopoda indet.
  - Dinosauria indet.
- Plants
  - Gymnospermae
    - Agathoxylon mendezii
    - Metapodocarpoxylon brasiliense

== See also ==
- Crato Formation
- Romualdo Formation
