= Araripedactylus =

Araripedactylus Temporal range: Albian, 112 Ma

Scientific classification
- Kingdom: Animalia
- Phylum: Chordata
- Class: Reptilia
- Order: †Pterosauria
- Suborder: †Pterodactyloidea
- Family: †Incertae sedis
- Genus: †Araripedactylus
- Species: †A. dehmi

Binomial name
- †Araripedactylus dehmi Wellnhofer, 1977

Extinct genus of reptiles

Araripedactylus is a potentially dubious genus of pterodactyloid pterosaur, known from a single wing bone found in the Early Cretaceous Santana Formation of Brazil.

The genus was in 1977 named by Peter Wellnhofer who, unaware that the name Araripesaurus had been published by Price in 1971, presumed he was naming the first pterosaur genus from Brazil. The genus name refers to the Araripe Plateau and combines this with daktylos, Greek for "finger", a common element in pterosaur names since Pterodactylus. The type species is Araripedactylus dehmi; the specific name honours the German paleontologist Richard Dehm, a professor at the Munich institute that acquired the only known specimen in 1975.

The holotype, BSP 1975 I 166, consists of a single phalanx, the first of the right wing finger, embedded in an elongated chalk nodule. When the nodule was split to reveal the fossil, its distal end was damaged. The exemplar is that of an adult individual. The phalanx has a length of 55 centimetres. Its bone walls are described by Wellnhofer as exceptionally thick for a pterosaur, measuring 3 to 5 meters (9.8 to 16.4 ft).

Wellnhofer, because of the lack of further information, placed Araripedactylus in a general Pterodactyloidea. Alexander Kellner in 2000 assumed that in view of its provenance the species likely belonged to Ornithocheiroidea (sensu Kellner) and concluded that the phalanx was hard to distinguish from that of other large pterosaurs from the formation, such as Anhanguera or Tropeognathus. He could not confirm the exceptional thickness of the bone walls, nor any other autapomorphy of the genus.

The wingspan of Araripedactylus was estimated by Wellnhofer as at least 4.8 metres (16 ft), and in another publication at 5 metres (16 ft).

In a comprehensive review of the taxonomy and paleobiology of Cretaceous pterosaurs from the Araripe Basin by Pinheiro et al. (2025), Araripedactylus was suggested to be a nomen dubium due to the fragmentary, incomplete type specimen and its proposed diagnostic features being too general for all pterodactyloids.

== Literature ==
- Wellnhofer, P., 1991, "The Santana Formation Pterosaurs", In: J. G. Maisey (ed.), Santana fossils: An Illustrated Atlas, T.F.H. Publications, Neptune, New Jersey, pp. 351–370

== See also ==
- Timeline of pterosaur research
- List of pterosaurs
