= Exu Formation =

Mesozoic geologic formation in Brazil

- Stratigraphic range: Albian
- Type: Geological formation
- Unit of: Araripe Group
- Underlies: Alluvium
- Overlies: Santana Group; Romualdo Formation

Lithology
- Primary: Sandstone

Location
- Coordinates: 7.6°S 40.7°W
- Approximate paleocoordinates: 12.6°S 12.1°W
- Region: Piauí
- Country: Brazil
- Extent: Araripe Basin
- Exu Formation (Brazil)

The Exu Formation is an Albian geologic formation in Brazil. Pterosaur fossils of Lophocratia indet. have been recovered from the formation.

== See also ==
- List of pterosaur-bearing stratigraphic units
- Basin history of the Araripe Basin
