= Santana Group =

Stratigraphic Group in Brazil

- Stratigraphic range: Aptian-Albian; ~115–108 Ma
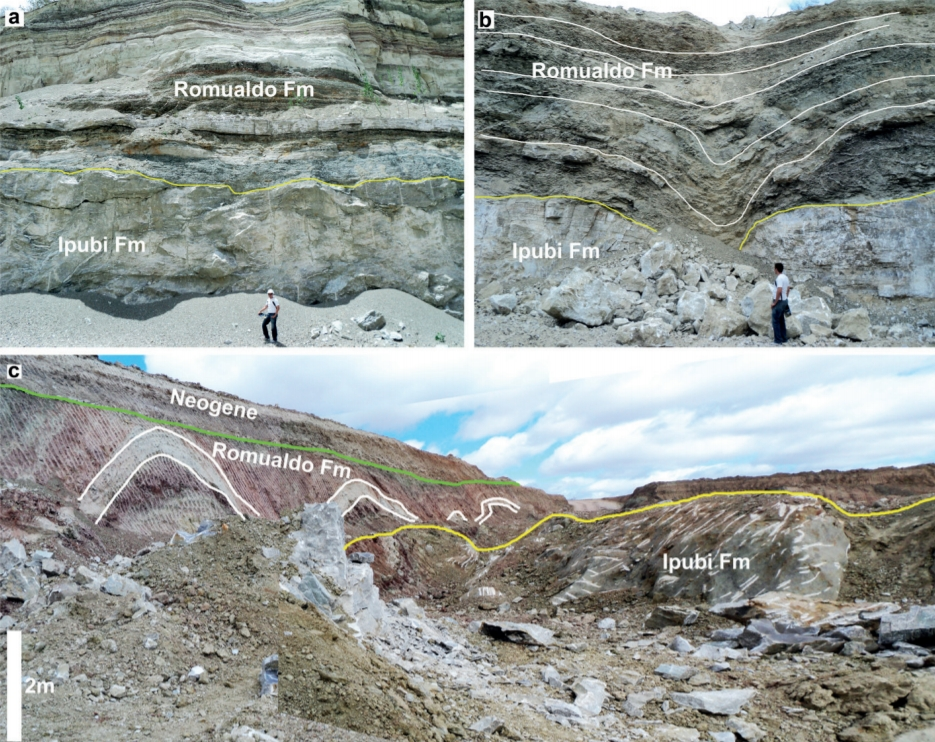
- Outcrop of the Santana Group; Ipubi & Romualdo Formations
- Type: Group
- Sub-units: Romualdo, Ipubi & Crato Formations
- Underlies: Araripina & Exu Formations
- Overlies: Barbalha Formation

Lithology
- Primary: Mudstone, sandstone, shale, anhydrite
- Other: Limestone, marl, siltstone

Location
- Coordinates: 5.6°S 64.3°W
- Approximate paleocoordinates: 9.2°S 34.0°W
- Region: Pernambuco; Piauí; Ceará
- Country: Brazil
- Extent: Araripe Basin

Type section
- Named for: Santana do Cariri
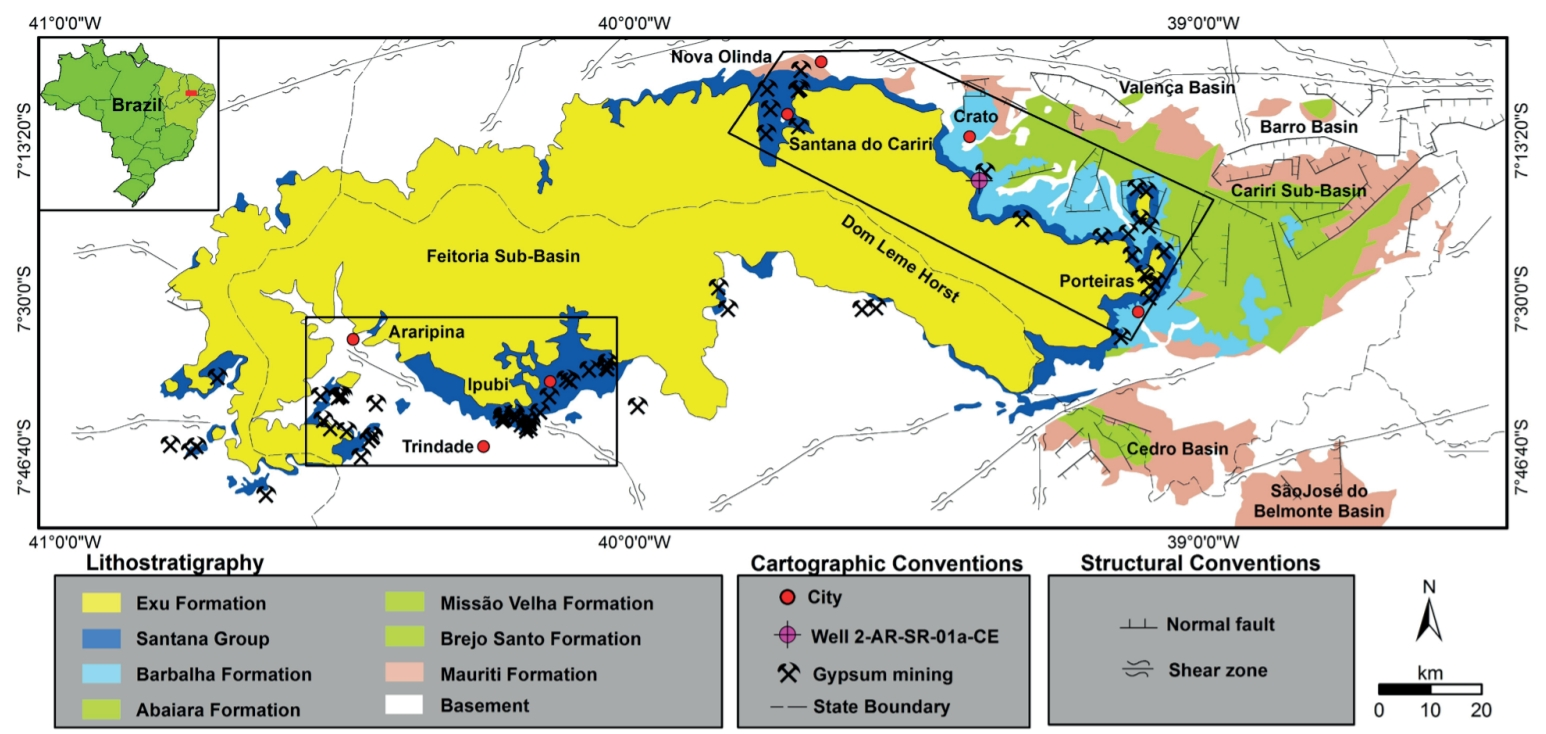
- Extent of the Santana Group in blue

The Santana Group is a geologic group, formerly included as the middle part of the Araripe Group, in the Araripe Basin of northeastern Brazil. The group comprises the Crato, Ipubi and Romualdo Formations and is dated to the Aptian to Albian stages of the Early Cretaceous. The formations of the group were deposited in a lacustrine to subtidal shallow marine environment in the Araripe rift basin.

The Santana Group has provided a rich assemblage of fossils; flora, fish, arthropods insects, turtles, snakes, dinosaurs including Irritator, and pterosaurs such as Thalassodromeus. The stratigraphic units of the group contained several feathers of birds, among those the first record of Mesozoic birds in Brazil. The Romualdo and Crato Formations are renowned for their excellent conservation and designated Lagerstätten. In 2006, the Araripe Basin was designated a UNESCO Global Geopark.

== Description ==
The Santana Group was formerly described as belonging to the Araripe Group. The fossiliferous Santana Formation was previously defined as containing the Crato and Romualdo Members, but redefinition of the stratigraphy led to the establishment of the Santana Group, replacing the middle part of the Araripe Group and the former Crato, Ipubi and Romualdo members were elevated to separate formations.

=== Basin history ===
The tectono-sedimentary evolution of the Araripe Basin, located in the Borborema Geologic Province, encompasses four stages, with five tectonostratigraphic phases:
1) Syneclise phase - Silurian to Devonian - characterized by tectonic quiescence in the Borborema Province. It is represented by the deposits of the Cariri Formation, that include medium to coarse-grained quartz sandstones, locally conglomeratic, deposited in large braided fluvial systems
2) Pre-rift phase - Tithonian - characterized by the mechanical subsidence due to lithosphere thinning that preceded the rift. It is represented by the Brejo Santo Formation, that comprises red shales and claystones, and the Missão Velha Formation, constituted by medium to coarse-grained quartz-feldspathic sandstones, locally conglomeratic, that contains entire trunks and fragments of silicified wood (Dadoxilon benderi) conifer
3) Rift phase - Berriasian to Hauterivian - characterized by increasing mechanical subsidence that created a system of grabens and half grabens. It is represented by the Abaiara Formation, that includes shales, siltstones, sandstones and conglomerates
4) Post-Rift I phase - Aptian to Albian - characterized by thermal subsidence. The lowermost unit Barbalha Formation, represents a fluviolacustrine phase and is composed of red and gray shales, siltstones and claystones.

The Santana Group was formed during this stage and comprises three stratigraphic units:

- Crato Formation that is composed of six intervals of laminated limestones (C1 to C6), interbedded with calciferous siltstones and marls, and is very rich in fossils of vertebrate and invertebrate organisms
- Ipubi Formation, that is mainly composed of organic-rich, black greenish bituminous shales, claystones and algal limestones that are interbedded with gypsum-anhydrite beds
- Romualdo Formation, that represents a calciferous siliciclastic succession composed of fine to medium-grained sandstones, argillaceous siltstones, calciferous shales, and limestones, very rich in fossils. This formation recorded the marine proto-Atlantic incursion that involved the Araripe Basin, and other interior basins and created a large seaway throughout the Borborema Province during the Albian

5) Post-rift II phase - Albian to Cenomanian - characterized by a major sag phase, and is formed by two stratigraphic units:

- Araripina Formation, that occurs in the western region of the basin and is composed by rhythmites and heterolithic layers of reddish, purplish and yellowish fine-grained sandstone and mudstone
- Exu Formation, that comprises medium-to coarse grained sandstones, fine grained clayey sandstones and local conglomeratic beds

== Fossil content ==
The upper and lower formations of the group are highly fossiliferous, with mainly insects, amphibians, fish, and flora dominating the lower Crato Formation, shrimps (Araripenaeus timidus), and various genera of dinosaurs and fish in the Romualdo Formation. A rich assemblage of pterosaur fossils are found in both formations, and the Ipubi Formation provided an indeterminate Pelomedusoides turtle.

The Santana Group provided several feathers of birds, among those the first record of Mesozoic birds in Brazil.

== Gallery ==
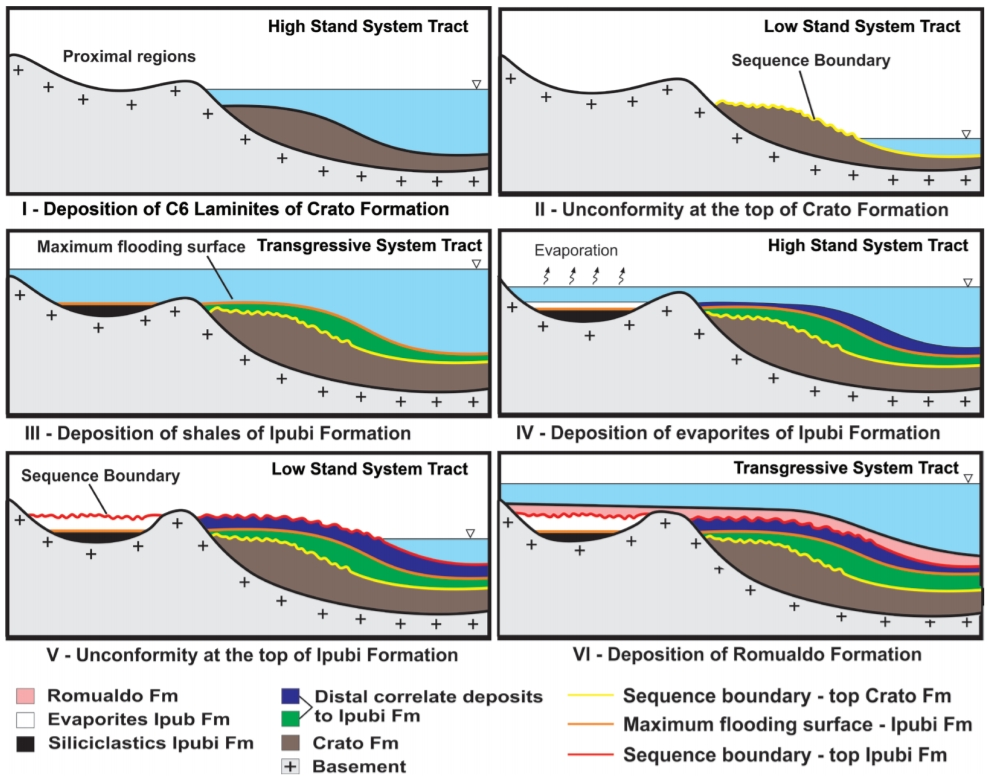
Schematic development of the depositional environments

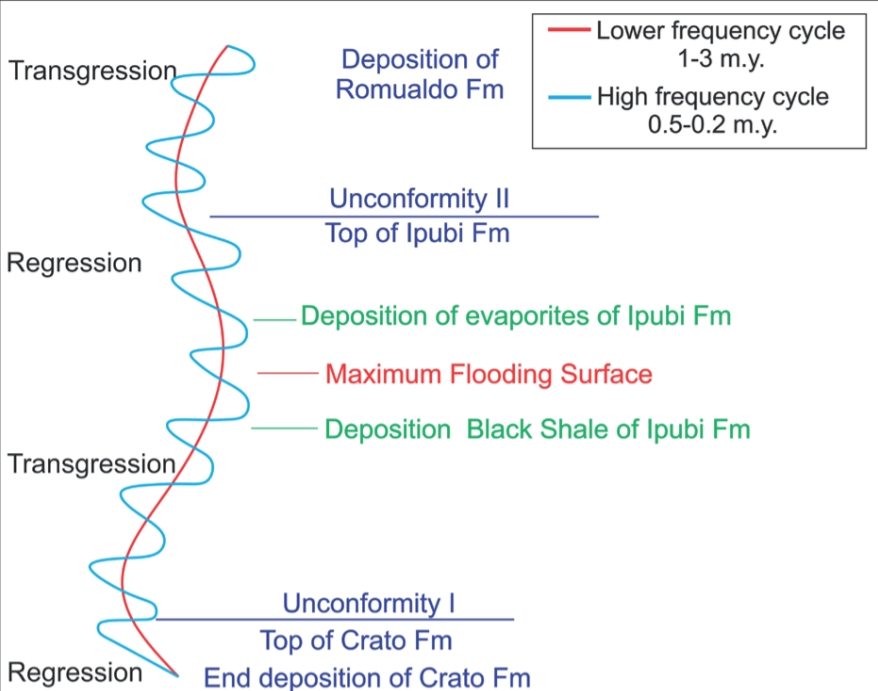
Lake level cyclicity

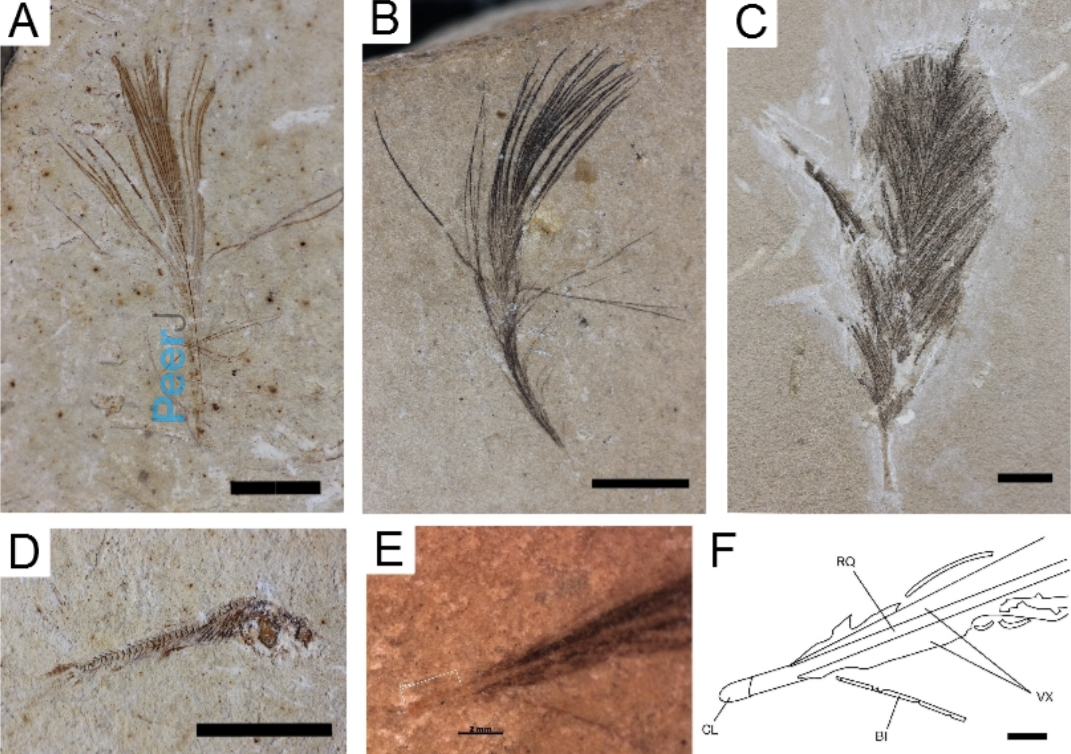
Fossil feathers and Dastilbe fossil

== See also ==
- Chapada do Araripe
- Ariri Formation
- Guarujá Formation
- Itapecuru Formation
