= Santana do Cariri =

Municipality in Ceará, Brazil

Coordinates: 7°11′S 39°44′W

- Municipality
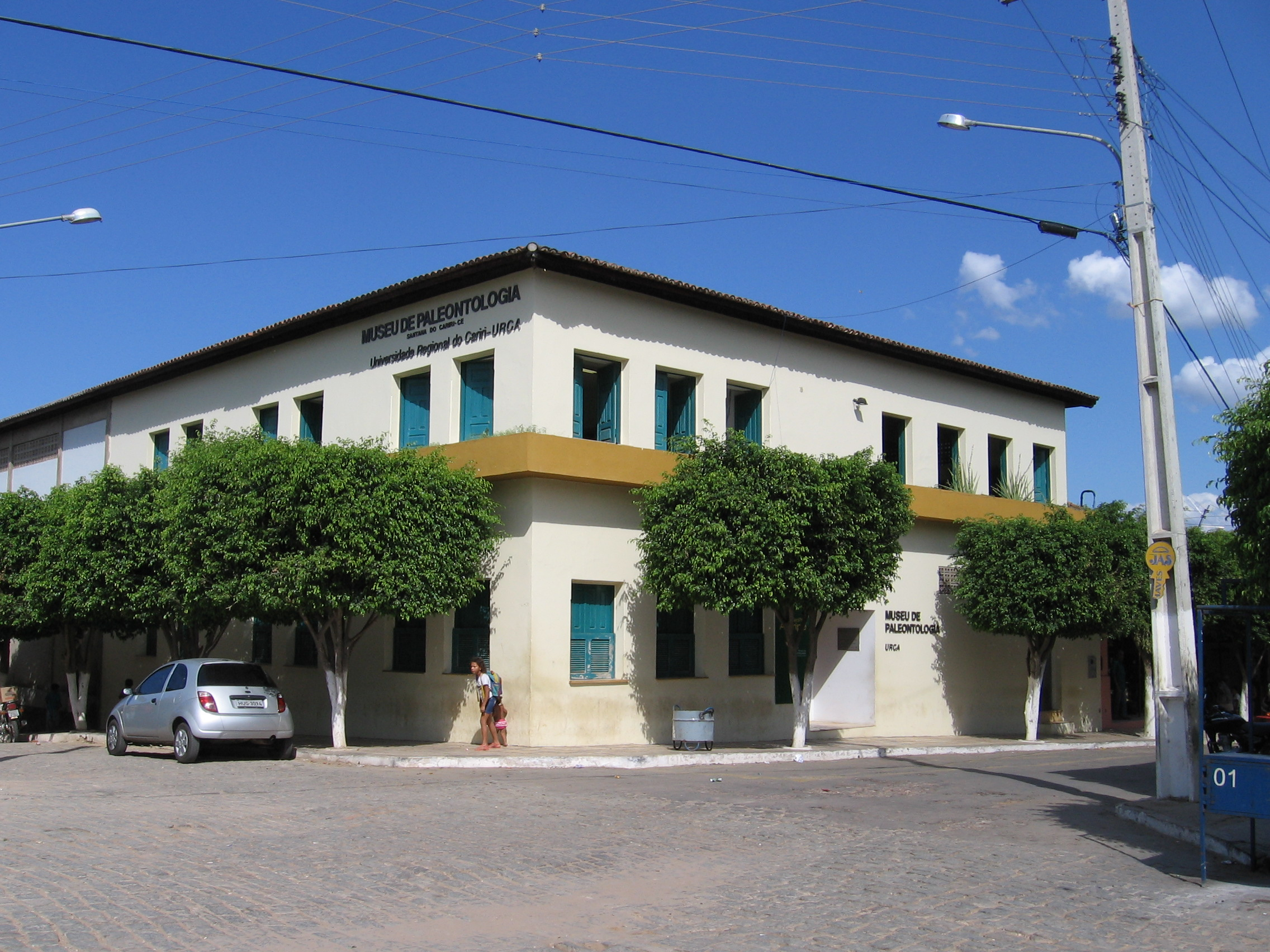

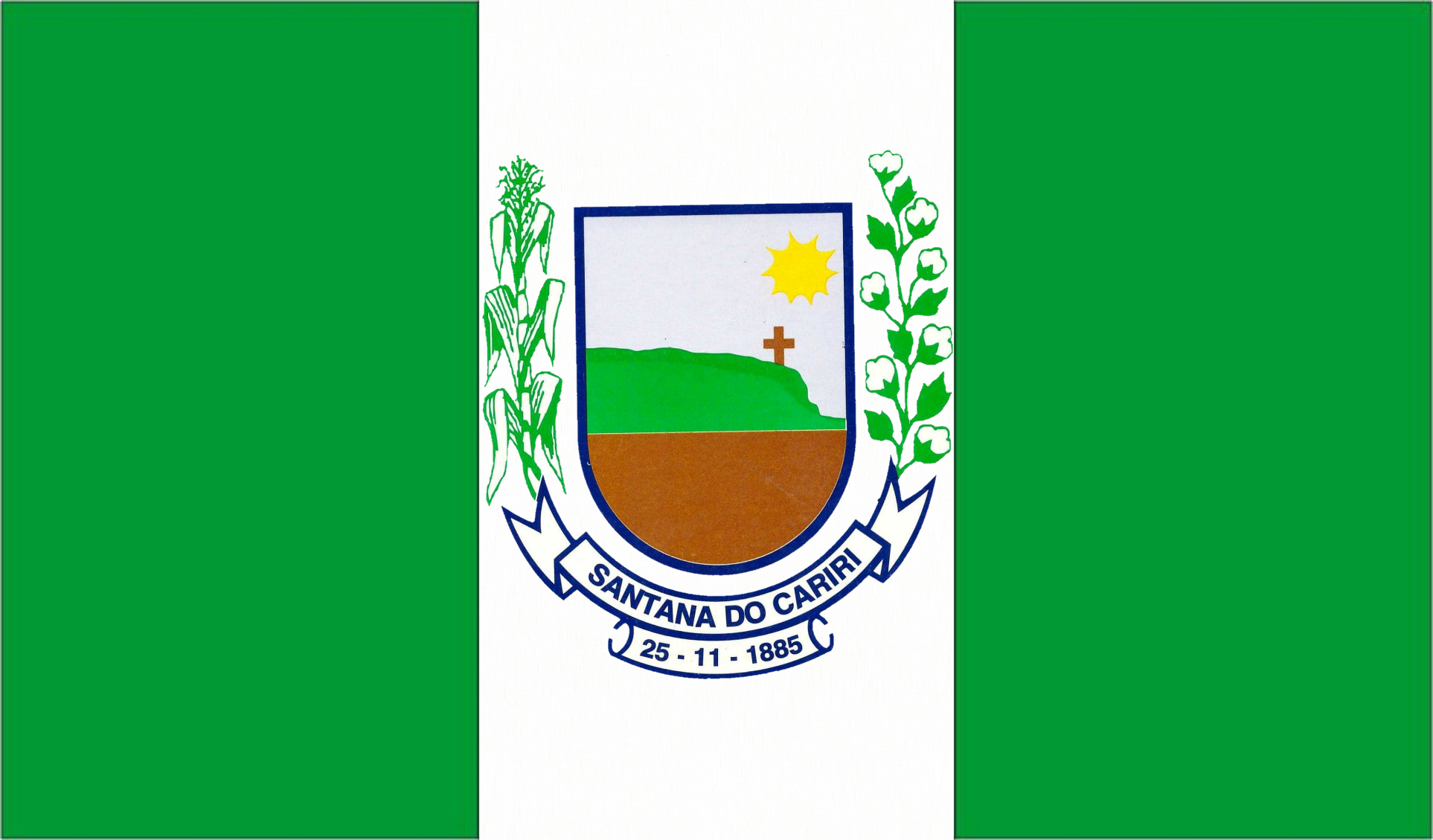
- Flag
- Interactive map of Santana do Cariri
- Country: Brazil
- Region: Nordeste
- State: Ceará
- Mesoregion: Sul Cearense

Population (2020)
  - Total: 17,712
- Time zone: UTC−3 (BRT)

Santana do Cariri is a municipality in the state of Ceará in the Northeast region of Brazil. It is located in the immediate and intermediate region of Juazeiro do Norte, as well as in the region of influence of Juazeiro do Norte.The municipality has 807 km^{2}. It is estimated that in 2021 its population has reached 17,726 thousand inhabitants, according to the IBGE. It has the title of “The Cearense Capital of Paleontology ''.

== History ==
It was originally called Brejo Grande, a place inhabited by native tribes of warriors called Buxixés, Tapuias who dominated, in addition to Araripe, bordering lands of Pernambuco. Its origin dates back to the end of the 17th century, when the brothers João Alves Feitosa and José Cavalcante coming from Casa da Torre (Bahia) requested and obtained land on the banks of the Brejo Grande Creek. Given the geologically favorable conditions, not only in relation to the livestock, but above all to agriculture, there was a rapid development of the stronghold attracting new residents to the region with the flux of residents a chapel was erected under the invocation of Senhora Santana, in the same place of the current Matriz. From this pioneering convergence, the village and the adjacent settlements would be born forming a rapid flowering stage.

The elevation of the camp to the category of village took place according to Provincial Law nº 2096, of November 26, 1885. The elevation to the category of municipality took place on December 20, 1938, still under the name of Santonópole, in the form of the Decree-Law nº 448. It currently has six districts: Santana do Cariri (Headquarters) Dom Leme (1987), Brejo Grande (1912), Anjinhos (1963), Araporanga (1938) and Pontal da Santana Cruz (1990) and two districts: Santana do Cariri (headquarters) and Inhumas (becomes a neighborhood in 2014 by municipal law n° 737).

== Toponomy ==
Santana do Cariri was also called Brejo Grande, Santana do Araripe, Santana do Cariri, Santanópole and finally returned to the traditional name on November 22, 1951, calling Santana do Cariri.

== Geography ==
=== Vegetation ===
The municipality's vegetation ranges from xeromorphic tropical evergreen forest, Carrasco, tropical rain evergreen rainforest to rain-cloud tropical evergreen rainforest.

=== Climate ===
The climate ranges from mild semi-arid hot tropical to sub-humid hot tropical. The rainy period occurs generally between January and May.

== Culture ==
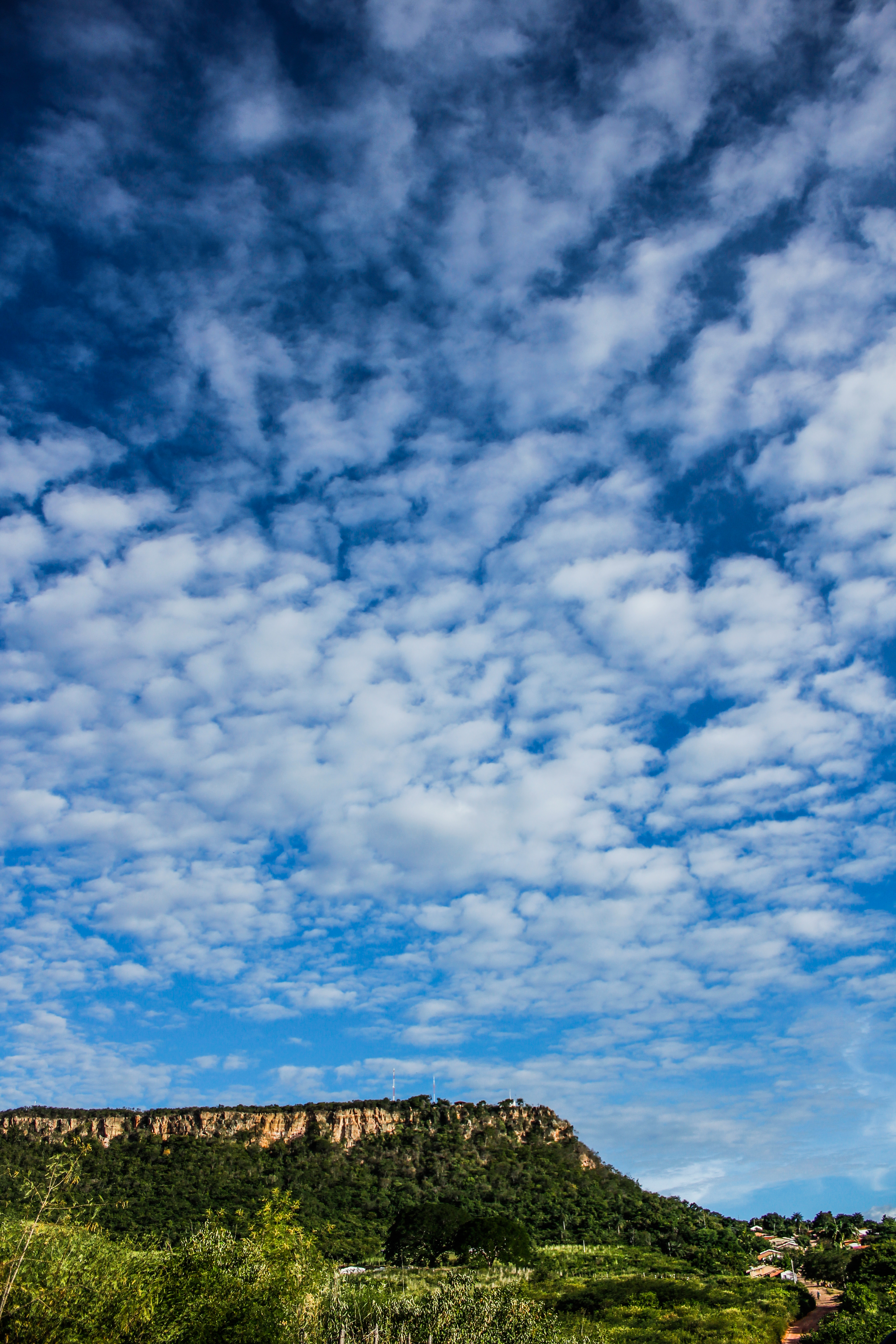
View of Chapada do Araripe in Santana do Cariri.

The municipality has as its religious symbol Senhora Santana, as well as the young Benigna Cardoso da Silva, better known as the heroine of chastity. It houses 19 public municipal schools, 2 (two) private schools and 1 state school.

The municipality has an archaeological site (Brazilian rock art) of historical and tourist interest. Santana do Cariri also stands out for the sale of products made manually at the Santanense Association of Support to the Craftsman. Tourists can buy typical handicrafts made from lace, embroidery, leather, ceramics and painting. In terms of gastronomy, emphasis is given to chicken à cabidela and baião-de-two with pequi.

It stands out for having a vast paleontological site, where several species of extinct animals have already been discovered. It houses the Museum of Paleontology of the Regional University of Cariri, the Casarão Cultural Felinto da Cruz Neves and Generosa Amélia da Cruz 1st female mayor of Santana, 1st of Ceará and 2nd of Brazil. Centenary church of Senhora Sant'Ana" in neoclassical style, Pontal da Santa Cruz at 750m above sea level with viewpoint and restaurant in Chapada do Araripe.

=== Historic sites ===
- Museum of Paleontology of the Regional University of Cariri
- Igreja Matriz de Nossa Senhora Santana
- Casarão (Historical Museum) of Coronel Felinto Cruz
- Cruzeiro do Pontal

=== Events ===
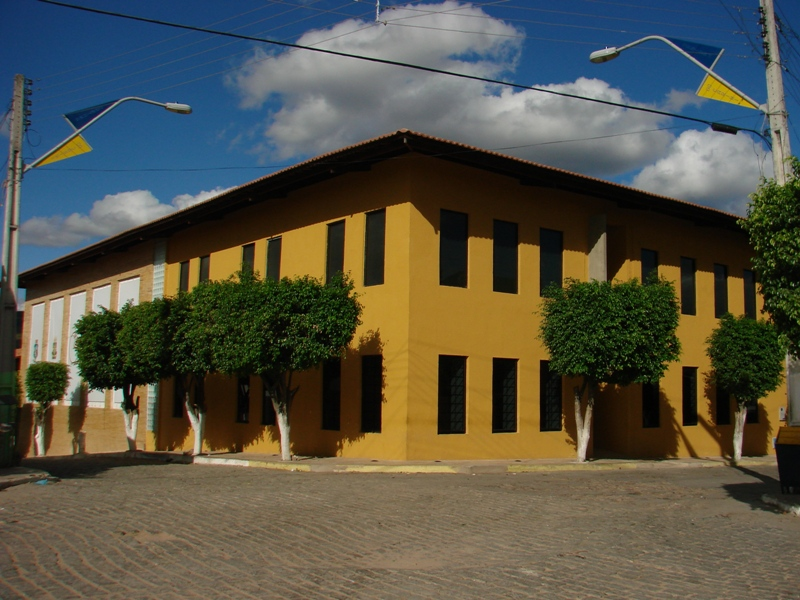
- Paleontology Museum - Santana do Cariri
  16th to 26 July: Feast of Nossa Senhora Santana. There are ten days of religious and popular celebrations, which begins with the folkloric-cultural procession, thousands of devotees leading the Pau da Bandeira de Inhumas to the parish of Senhora Santana, accompanied by folk groups and a music band, in a sacred-profane manifestation. . Continuing in the following days, the novena in praise of Santa Ana. On the boardwalk, popular festivals take place with presentations by bands, popular artists, concerts, exhibitions, retretas, auctions, bingos; at the stalls: typical food and drinks and handicrafts. The closing is done with the great procession of the patron saint with the participation of thousands of faithful.
- June: Festa de Quadrilhas and Grande Vaquejada de Santana do Cariri. Mass blessing of the hats, parade and choice of the queen, during the three days of dispute between several pairs of cowboys in the felling of oxen. Dancing parties that mark the great presence of the Public.
- 21 to 25 November: Municipality Week. Festive week, in which the municipality's anniversary is celebrated, where artistic and cultural activities are carried out involving the urban and rural community: sports competitions, concerts with popular artists, talent festivals, cultural presentations, dancing parties, retretas, tourism and handicrafts, fireworks show.

== See also ==
- List of municipalities in Ceará
