= Dinosaurs Alive! (attraction) =

Defunct attraction at Cedar Fair amusement parks

Canada's Wonderland
- Area: Planet Snoopy
- Status: Removed
- Opening date: May 6, 2012
- Closing date: October 29, 2018
- Replaced by: Snoopy's Racing Railway

Carowinds
- Area: Carolina RFD
- Status: Removed
- Opening date: March 29, 2013
- Closing date: August 18, 2019
- Replaced: Joe Cool's Driving School

Cedar Point
- Area: Adventure Island; Camp Snoopy
- Status: Removed
- Cost: $1 million
- Opening date: May 12, 2012
- Closing date: September 3, 2018
- Replaced: Paddlewheel Excursions
- Replaced by: Forbidden Frontier (2019-2022)

Dorney Park & Wildwater Kingdom
- Status: Removed
- Opening date: April 28, 2012
- Closing date: October 28, 2018

Kings Dominion
- Area: Old Virginia
- Status: Removed
- Soft opening date: April 5, 2012
- Opening date: April 6, 2012
- Closing date: October 28, 2018
- Replaced by: GrimmWoods (2021-Present)

Kings Island
- Area: Coney Mall
- Status: Removed
- Opening date: May 26, 2011
- Closing date: October 29, 2017
- Replaced by: Orion, Kings Mills Antique Autos

Valleyfair
- Status: Removed
- Cost: $3.5 million
- Opening date: May 11, 2013
- Closing date: October 27, 2019
- Replaced by: Monster Jam (2022-2023)

Worlds of Fun
- Area: Africa
- Status: Removed
- Opening date: April 20, 2013
- Closing date: October 27, 2019
- Replaced by: Zambezi Zinger

Ride statistics
- Attraction type: Walkthrough exhibit
- Theme: Dinosaurs
- This is a pay-per-use attraction

Dinosaurs Alive! was an animatronic dinosaur themed area which formerly operated at several amusement parks and zoos, but has since been closed.

The exhibits were created by Dinosaurs Unearthed. Some markets, like Toronto, previously staged their touring exhibit at other venues. Some reviewers noted that seeing a roller coaster in the background was an "incongruity". A sand pit allowed children to "dig" for dinosaurs at an area near the end of the attraction.

== Dinosaurs ==
The exhibits featured dinosaurs that were built to scale and depicted various habitats they would have likely encountered. Among the variety of species present throughout the attraction, the dinosaurs themselves could range from several feet in height and length to the much larger Ruyangosaurus, which stood more than 30 feet (9.1 m) tall. Each amusement park configuration was unique, with some featuring exhibits not present at the others:

| Park | Dinosaurs |
|---|---|
Brookfield Zoo
| 2009 | Ruyangosaurus, Protoceratops, Pteranodon, Yangchuanosaurus, Dilophosaurus, Metriacanthosaurus, Omeisaurus, Stegosaurus, Apatosaurus, Allosaurus, Baryonyx, Deinonychus, Parasaurolophus, Triceratops and Tyrannosaurus Plus, juveniles of Stegosaurus, Apatosaurus, and Tyrannosaurus. |
| 2013 | Shantungosaurus, Styracosaurus, Kosmoceratops, Olorotitan, Gigantoraptor, Alxasaurus, Confuciusornis, Sinosauropteryx, Velociraptor, Microraptor, Stegosaurus, Amargasaurus, Spinosaurus, Omeisaurus, Triceratops, Parasaurolophus, Dyoplosaurus, Tuojiangosaurus, Carnotaurus, Pachycephalosaurus, Dilophosaurus and Tyrannosaurus |
| Calgary Zoo | The same animatronic dinosaurs from Brookfield Zoo from 2009 were moved here for 2010 minus the Ruyangosaurus. Three new dinosaurs were added that were discovered in Alberta, Canada: Albertosaurus, Pachyrhinosaurus, and Euoplocephalus. |
| Canada's Wonderland | Albertosaurus, Allosaurus, Baryonyx, Carnotaurus, Chasmosaurus, Deinonychus, Dyoplosaurus, Eotyrannus, Herrerasaurus, Huayangosaurus, Hypacrosaurus, Irritator, Kosmoceratops, Maiasaura, Mamenchisaurus, Mojoceratops, Monoclonius, Monolophosaurus, Ouranosaurus, Pachycephalosaurus, Pachyrhinosaurus, Parasaurolophus, Ruyangosaurus, Spinosaurus, Stegosaurus, Tenontosaurus, Triceratops, Tyrannosaurus and Yangchuanosaurus |
| Carowinds | Tsintaosaurus, Dilophosaurus, Triceratops, and more |
| Cedar Point | Albertosaurus, Allosaurus, Amargasaurus, Angustinaripterus, Anhanguera, Apatosaurus, Baryonyx, Carnotaurus, Chasmosaurus, Deinonychus, Dilophosaurus, Eotyrannus, Herrerasaurus, Hypacrosaurus, Irritator, Kosmoceratops, Mamenchisaurus, Mojoceratops, Monoclonius, Monolophosaurus, Olorotitan, Omeisaurus, Ouranosaurus, Pachycephalosaurus, Pachyrhinosaurus, Parasaurolophus, Ruyangosaurus, Saltasaurus, Spinosaurus, Stegosaurus, Tenontosaurus, Torosaurus, Triceratops, Tyrannosaurus and Yangchuanosaurus |
| Dorney Park | Albertosaurus, Allosaurus, Amargasaurus, Angustinaripterus, Apatosaurus, Baryonyx, Carnotaurus, Chasmosaurus, Deinonychus, Dyoplosaurus, Eotyrannus, Herrerasaurus, Irritator, Kosmoceratops, Mamenchisaurus, Mojoceratops, Monoclonius, Monolophosaurus, Ouranosaurus, Pachycephalosaurus, Pachyrhinosaurus, Parasaurolophus, Ruyangosaurus, Spinosaurus, Stegosaurus, Tenontosaurus, Triceratops, Tyrannosaurus and Yangchuanosaurus |
| Kings Dominion | Albertosaurus, Allosaurus, Amargasaurus, Angustinaripterus, Apatosaurus, Baryonyx, Carnotaurus, Chasmosaurus, Deinonychus, Dyoplosaurus, Eotyrannus, Herrerasaurus, Irritator, Kosmoceratops, Mamenchisaurus, Mojoceratops, Monoclonius, Monolophosaurus, Ouranosaurus, Pachycephalosaurus, Pachyrhinosaurus, Parasaurolophus, Ruyangosaurus, Spinosaurus, Stegosaurus, Tenontosaurus, Triceratops, Tyrannosaurus and Yangchuanosaurus |
| Kings Island | Albertosaurus, Allosaurus, Amargasaurus, Angustinaripterus, Apatosaurus, Baryonyx, Carnotaurus, Chasmosaurus, Deinonychus, Dilophosaurus, Dyoplosaurus, Eotyrannus, Herrerasaurus, Hypacrosaurus, Irritator, Kosmoceratops, Mamenchisaurus, Metriacanthosaurus, Mojoceratops, Monoclonius, Monolophosaurus, Olorotitan, Omeisaurus, Ouranosaurus, Pachycephalosaurus, Pachyrhinosaurus, Parasaurolophus, Pinacosaurus, Psittacosaurus, Ruyangosaurus, Saltasaurus, Sauroposeidon, Spinosaurus, Stegosaurus, Styracosaurus, Tenontosaurus, Torosaurus, Triceratops, Tyrannosaurus and Yangchuanosaurus |
| Toronto Zoo | Stegosaurus, Triceratops, Tyrannosaurus rex |
| Valleyfair | Allosaurus, Apatosaurus, Baryonyx, Dilophosaurus, Huayangosaurus, Mamenchisaurus, Omeisaurus, Pachycephalosaurus, Parasaurolophus, Spinosaurus, Stegosaurus, Triceratops, Tyrannosaurus rex, and Yangchuanosaurus |
| Woodbine Fantasy Fair | Spinosaurus |
| Worlds of Fun | Allosaurus, Baryonyx, Carnotaurus, Chasmosaurus, Dacentrurus, Deinonychus, Herrerasaurus, Irritator, Kosmoceratops, Mamenchisaurus, Mojoceratops, Olorotitan, Pachycephalosaurus, Pachyrhinosaurus, Parasaurolophus, Ruyangosaurus, Saichania, Saltasaurus, Spinosaurus, Stegosaurus, Tenontosaurus, Triceratops, and Tyrannosaurus rex |

In addition to being life-sized, many of the dinosaurs were animatronic. Models featured moving skin, with no visible joints or seams. Some were interactive, that allowed visitors to press buttons on the exhibit's sign to control the movement of various body parts depending on where the button was located (e.g., button on snout opens jaws, button on throat thrashes neck and button on rear makes the tail sway). The non-interactive animatronic dinosaurs were activated when motion sensors detect movement by guests walking by. Sound effects from hidden speakers also accompanied the various movements including roaring, bellowing and/or shrieking.

== Size ==
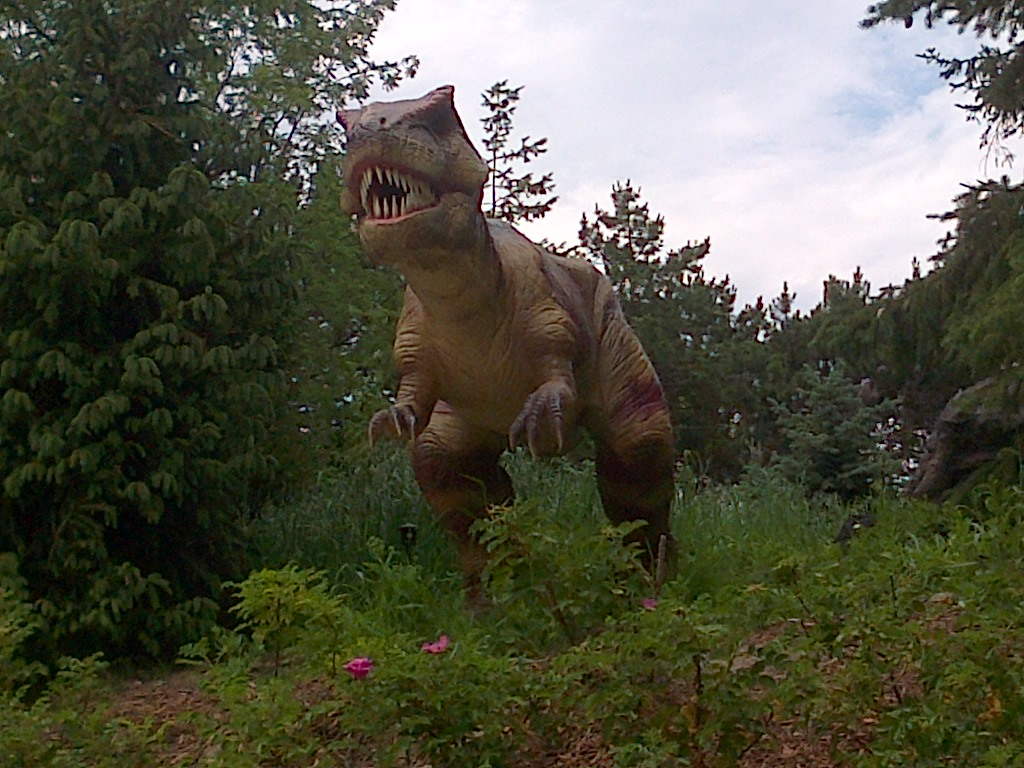
Dinosaurs Alive! exhibit entrance at Canada's Wonderland

| Location | Park | Dinosaurs | Trail length | Area |
|---|---|---|---|---|
| Calgary, Alberta | Calgary Zoo | 20 | | |
| Vaughan, Ontario | Canada's Wonderland | 40 | Unknown | 7 acres (2.8 ha) |
| Charlotte, North Carolina | Carowinds | 32 | 1,000 yd (910 m) | 5 acres (2.0 ha) |
| Sandusky, Ohio | Cedar Point | 50 | 1,900 ft (580 m) | 4 acres (1.6 ha) |
| Allentown, Pennsylvania | Dorney Park | 37 | 2,100 ft (640 m) | 3.3 acres (1.3 ha) |
| Doswell, Virginia | Kings Dominion | 36 | 3,000 ft (910 m) | 6 acres (2.4 ha) |
| Mason, Ohio | Kings Island | 60 | 4,000 ft (1,200 m) | 12.5 acres (5.1 ha) |
| Scarborough, Ontario | Toronto Zoo | 16 | | |
| Shakopee, Minnesota | Valleyfair | Unknown | 2,837 ft (865 m) | 5 acres (2.0 ha) |
| Kansas City, Missouri | Worlds of Fun | 35 | 1,900 ft (580 m) | 2 acres (0.81 ha) |

== Movie ==
A dinosaur-related 3D movie was shown at Carowinds in their respective Action Theater with the motion seats removed. It was also shown at King Dominion and Canada's Wonderland as well. The film was included with park admission at most parks, while admission to both the attraction and film cost $6 at Canada's Wonderland. At Wonderland, the film shown in the theater is the 11-minute Monsters of the Deep, while Dinosaurs: Monsters of Patagonia was shown at Carowinds and Kings Island.

Kings Island, Cedar Point and Carowinds charged an additional $5 admission per person over the age of 2. However, Carowinds did offer special Dinosaurs Alive! endorsement stickers that could be attached to season passes for $15, granting the passholder unlimited trips through the exhibit for that season.

== Reception ==
The added admission fee was the target of criticism. Cedar Point representatives have stated that the fee is to avoid overcrowding in the section. A writer for Wired.com suggested that, given the cost of admission, parking and food at Canada's Wonderland, the added cost of Dinosaurs Alive! was trivial. Some theme park enthusiasts suggested in advance of opening that the attraction would not be "repeatable", in advance of its Cedar Point opening.

Many dinosaurs in the Canada's Wonderland attraction were juveniles, causing one reviewer to speculate this was "a cost-saving measure." The reviewer also noted that in some instances, the info panels didn't match the depiction in the exhibit. For example, the Canada's Wonderland Eotyrannus lacked feathers despite the nearby illustration suggesting otherwise.

== See also ==
- 2011 in amusement parks
- 2012 in amusement parks
- 2013 in amusement parks
- Dinosaur Island (Sea World)
- Dinosaurs Alive!, an IMAX film
