= Dinosaurs Alive! =

- Directed by: David Clark; Bayley Silleck
- Written by: David Clark; Bayley Silleck
- Produced by: David Clark, Inc. Giant Screen Films; Maryland Science Center; Stardust Blue LLC
- Narrated by: Michael Douglas
- Edited by: Stephen Johnson
- Music by: Michel Cusson
- Distributed by: Giant Screen Films
- Release date: March 30, 2007
- Running time: 40 minutes
- Language: English

Dinosaurs Alive! is a 2007 IMAX documentary produced by Giant Screen Films about various dinosaurs that inhabited the Earth between 251 and 65 Ma. The documentary features animals from the Triassic period of New Mexico to the Cretaceous period of Mongolia, as well as the American Museum of Natural History's research on both periods.

== Featured Animals ==
- Protoceratops
- Velociraptor
- Unidentified pterosaurs (most likely Kepodactylus)
- Diplodocus (identified as “Seismosaurus”)
- Tarbosaurus
- Tarchia
- Pinacosaurus (mentioned)
- Oviraptor
- Confuciusornis
- Sinosauropteryx (shown)
- Microraptor (shown)
- Sinornithosaurus (shown)
- Effigia
- Coelophysis
- Postosuchus
- Redondasaurus

== See also ==
- Dinosaurs of Antarctica
- Dinosaurs: Giants of Patagonia
- Dinosaur Planet
- T-Rex: Back to the Cretaceous
- Walking with Dinosaurs
- When Dinosaurs Roamed America
- Dinosaurs Alive (attraction), a former kid's area at various Six Flags theme parks.
