= Snoopy's Racing Railway =

Family roller coasters at Canada's Wonderland and Carowinds

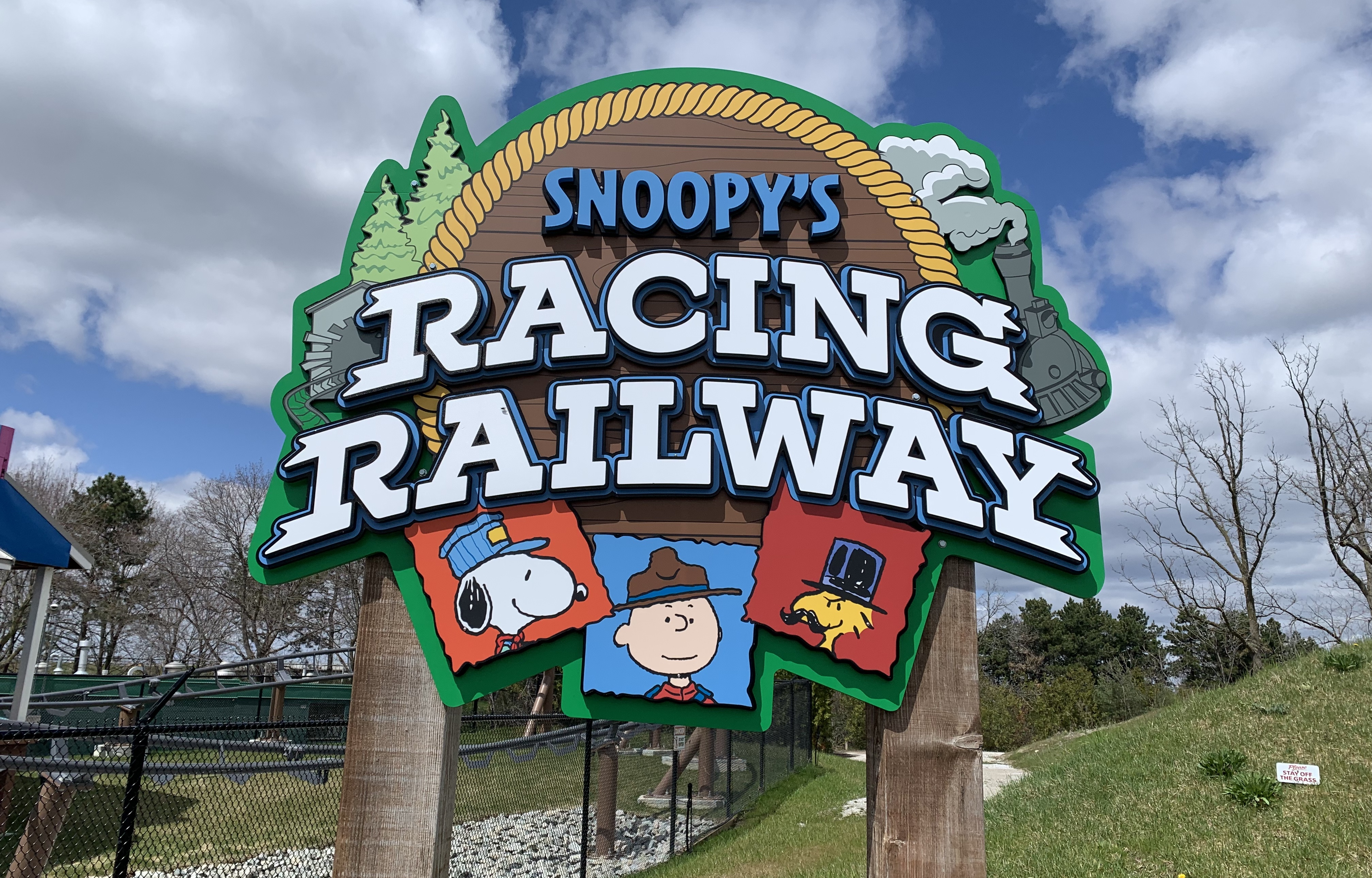

Canada's Wonderland
- Park section: Planet Snoopy
- Coordinates: 43.844393°N 79.545872°W
- Status: Operating
- Opening date: May 18, 2023; 3 years ago
- Replaced: Dinosaurs Alive!

Carowinds
- Park section: Camp Snoopy
- Coordinates: 35.101916°N 80.939302°W
- Status: Operating
- Opening date: May 24, 2025; 12 months ago
- Replaced: Snoopy's Junction
- Snoopy's Racing Railway at Carowinds at RCDB

General statistics
- Type: Steel – Family – Launched
- Manufacturer: ART Engineering
- Model: Family Launch Coaster
- Lift/launch system: Tire launch
- Height: 29.5 ft (9.0 m)
- Length: 803.8 ft (245.0 m)
- Speed: 31.1 mph (50.1 km/h)
- Capacity: 480 riders per hour
- Height restriction: 36 in (91 cm)
- Trains: Single train with 7 cars. Riders are arranged 2 across in a single row for a total of 14 riders per train.
- Theme: Snoopy
- Website: Official website
- Fast Lane available at Carowinds
- Snoopy's Racing Railway at RCDB

Snoopy's Racing Railway is a pair of steel, family launched roller coasters located at Canada's Wonderland in Vaughan, Ontario which was opened in 2023, and Carowinds in Charlotte, North Carolina which opened in 2025.

== History ==
=== Canada's Wonderland ===
In 2021, ART Engineering developed and opened Fridolin's Verrückter Zauberexpress (English: Fridolin's Crazy Magic Express) at Fantasiana in Straßwalchen, Austria. Although it featured multiple accelerated launch sections, the coaster had been tailor-made towards younger riders and sported a low 90-centimetre (35 in) height requirement, rendering it suitable for children of all ages. Canada's Wonderland – which already had a working relationship with ART Engineering on Wonder Mountain's Guardian and other maintenance equipment – monitored its development and eventually commissioned a copy of the layout for their own park.

Snoopy's Racing Railway was formally announced on August 11, 2022, set to replace the former Dinosaurs Alive! attraction in Planet Snoopy and open in 2023. The attraction would debut alongside Tundra Twister, a Mondial thrill ride also set to be constructed that offseason. The original coaster had been designed with a far lower park attendance in mind; Canada's Wonderland opted to expand its train with an extra car and initially planned to run it for only a single lap cycle (Fantasiana's coaster ran for two). The latter idea was scrapped and Snoopy's Racing Railway was programmed to cycle the layout twice.

Construction picked up in late 2022, with ground cleared and the first pieces of rebar planted. Track for Snoopy's Racing Railway began arriving in January 2023, and the coaster trains delivered the following month. The coaster opened to the public on May 18, 2023. For its first year of operations the park restricted access to adults, requiring all riders taller than 60-inch (150 cm) to be accompanied by a child; the policy was removed in 2024 as part of a wider corporate directive.

=== Carowinds ===
With the Canadian installation completed, ART Engineering was formally introduced to Carowinds in September 2023. Carowinds first filed permits with York County on March 5, 2024, codenamed Project Sparrow and situated on the South Carolina side of the park. Sparrow's contents were leaked by means of a FOIA request later that month, depicting multiple new attractions in the park's Camp Snoopy area and Snoopy's Junction miniature railway being removed to make way for Racing Railway. The train route was ripped out in June and was expected at the time to be rebuilt on a portion of the former Dinosaurs Alive! site; these plans have seemingly since been scrapped.

Teasing began in late July, when Carowinds posted a graphic online heralding "Funner. Faster. Splashier" novelties. Carowinds officially announced Snoopy's Racing Railway on August 7, 2024 alongside other attractions and upgrades within Camp Snoopy. The first anchor baskets for foundations were imported in June, with coaster track first arriving at the beginning of November while footers went into the ground; Snoopy's Racing Railway is expected to be ready for the beginning of the 2025 season.

== Ride experience ==
Snoopy's Racing Railway consists of a short layout with two enclosed launches and multiple set pieces, which guests complete two laps on during the ride. Both attractions pit Conductor Snoopy against troublemaking from Woodstock and his friends, but feature revised storylines; the Canada's Wonderland version sees the train outrunning Woodstock's Bad Seed Gang through town before they're captured by RCMP Officer Charlie Brown, while the Carowinds attraction is set around Snoopy delivering root beer and pizza to Camp Snoopy's Mess Hall.

== Photo Gallery ==
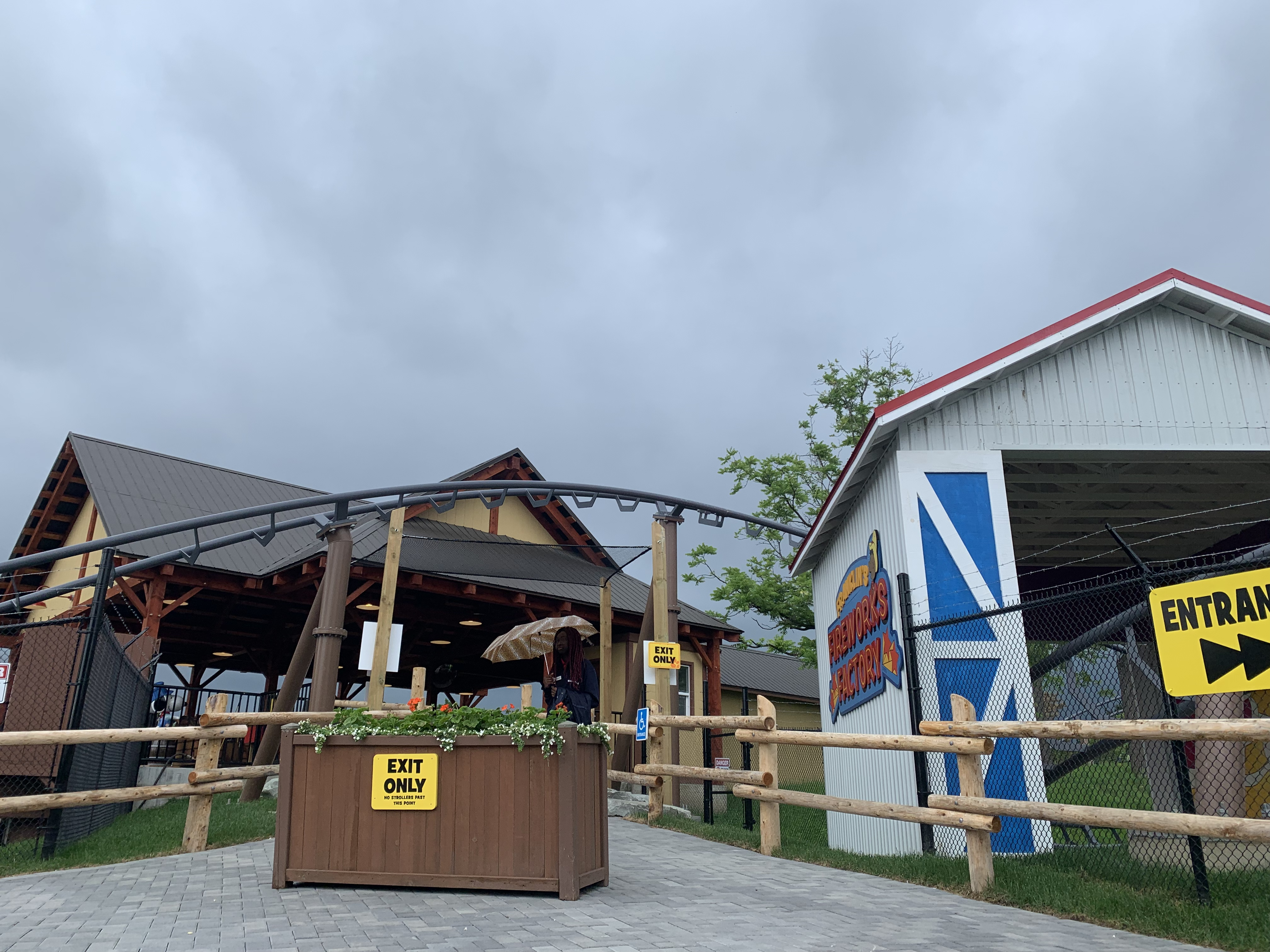
Snoopy's Racing Railway at Canada's Wonderland

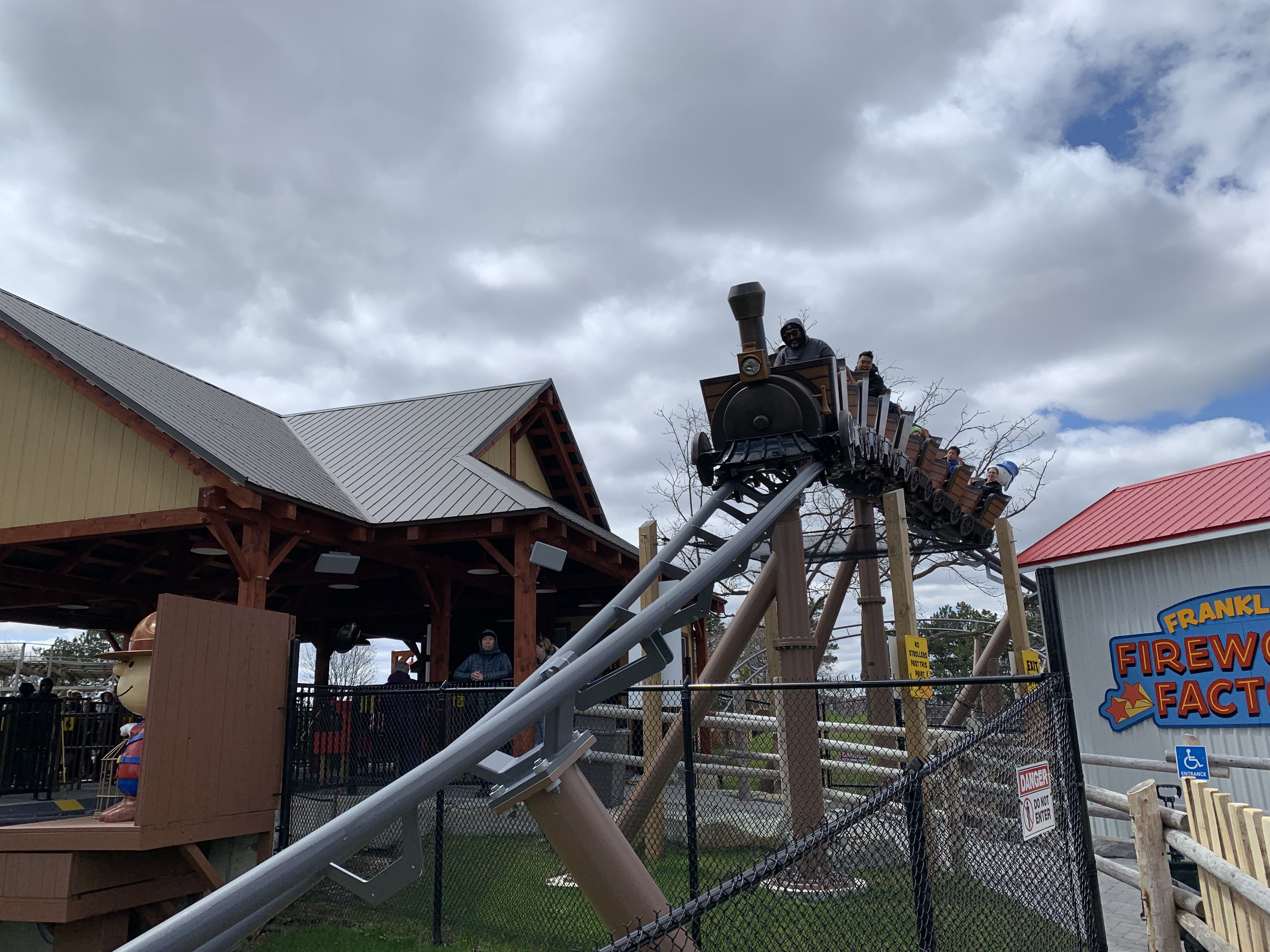
Plaza view

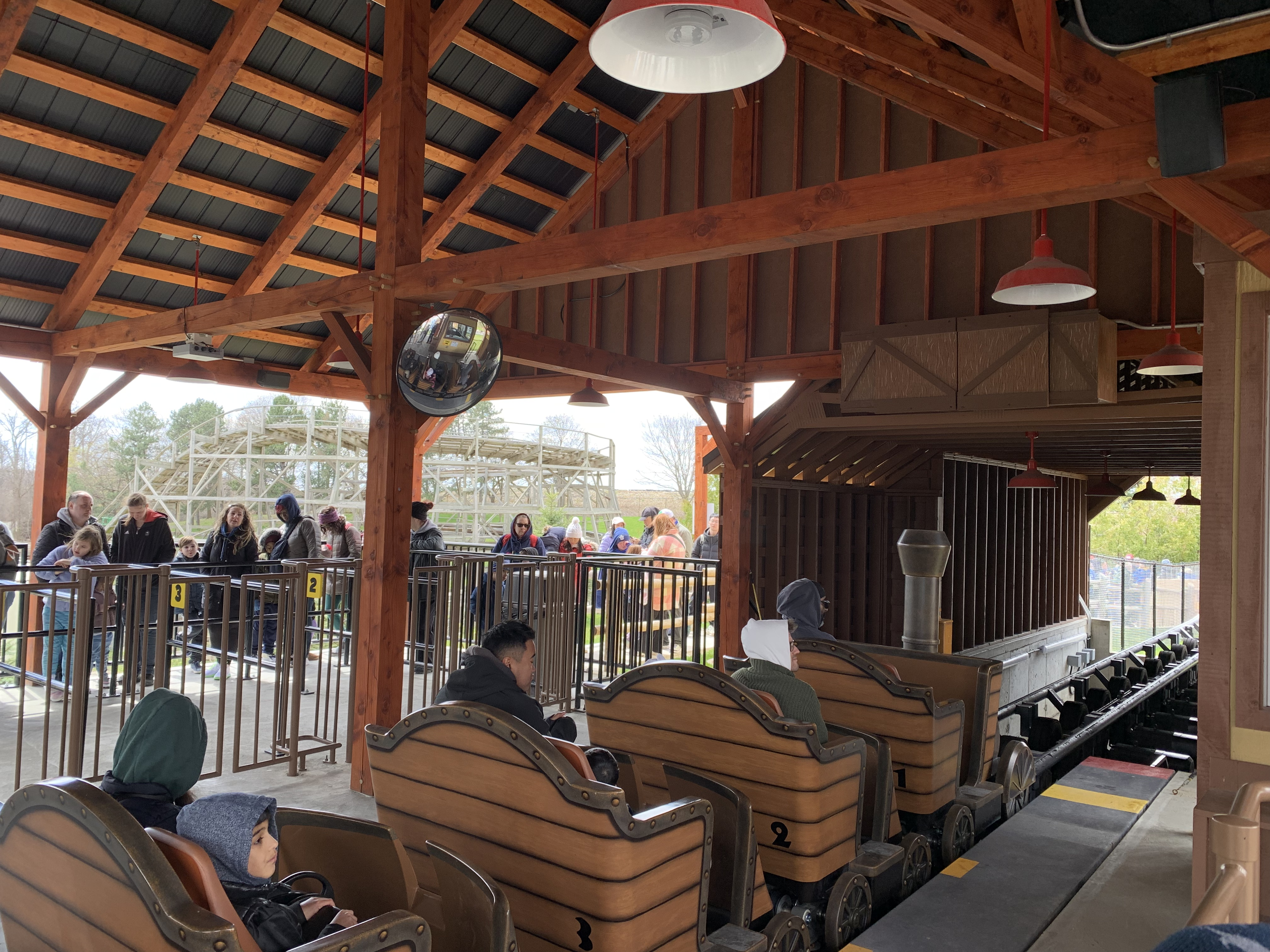
Snoopy's Racing Railway's station

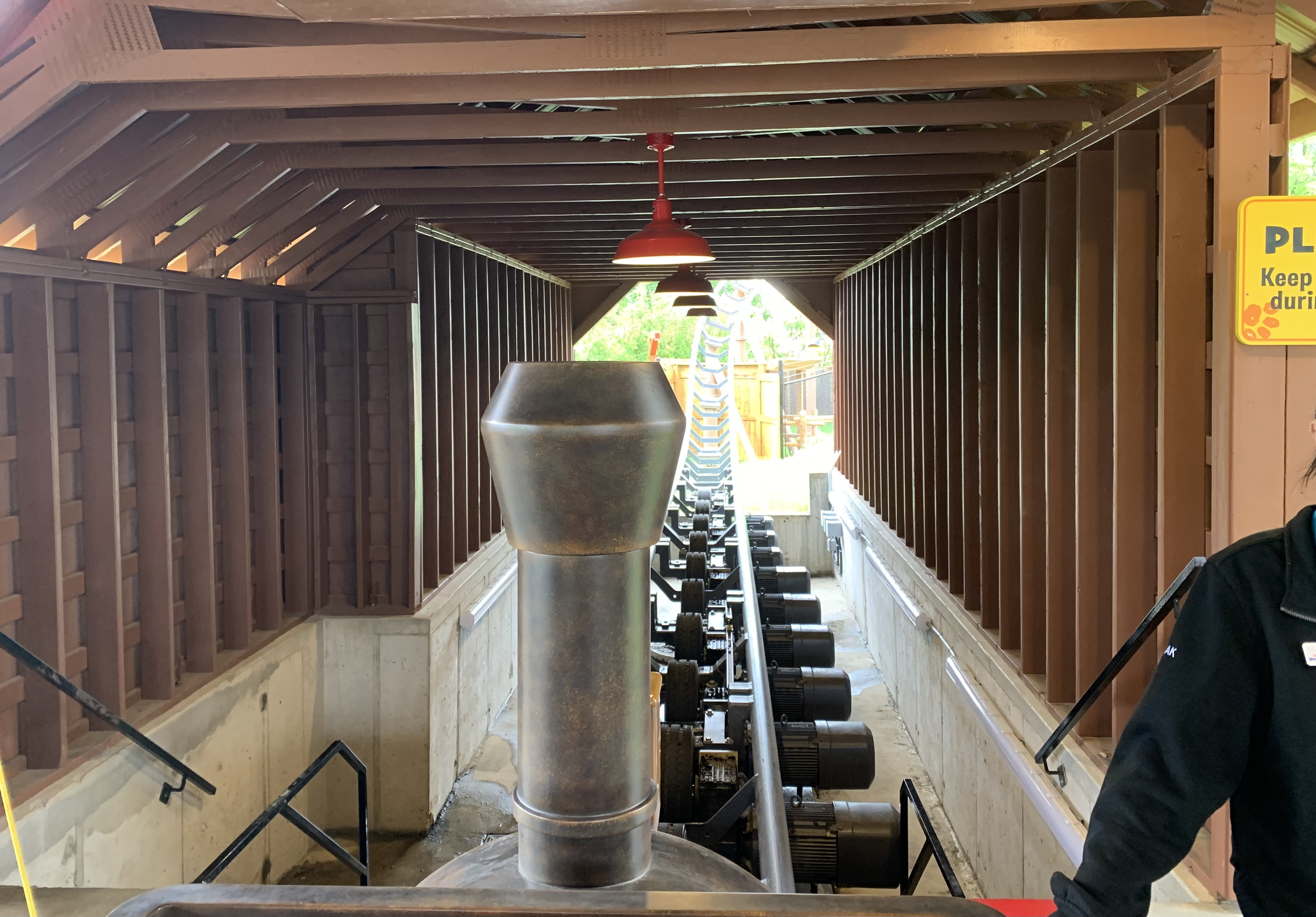
First launch as seen while boarding

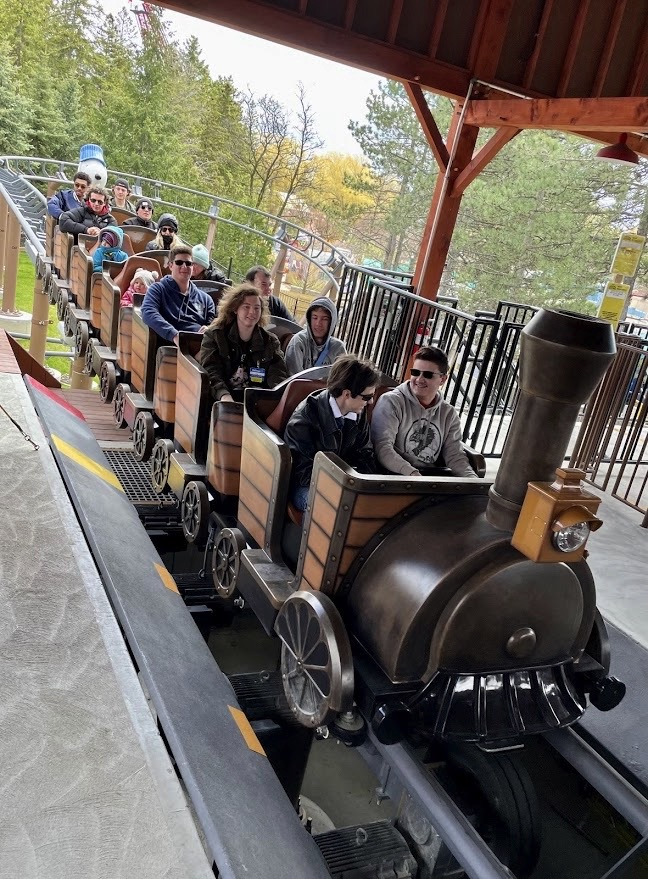
Full view of Snoopy's Racing Railway's train

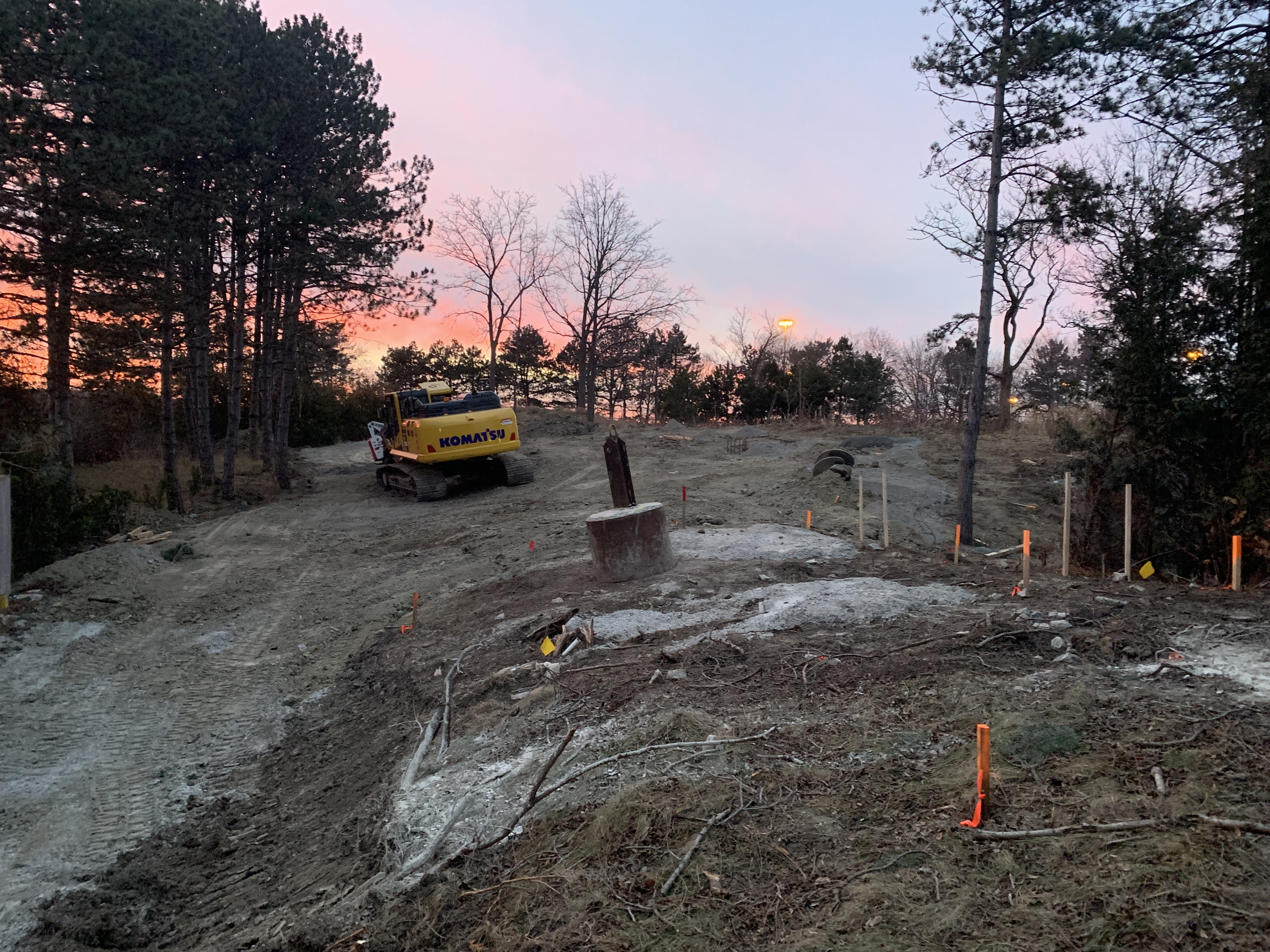
Construction site at Canada's Wonderland in December 2022

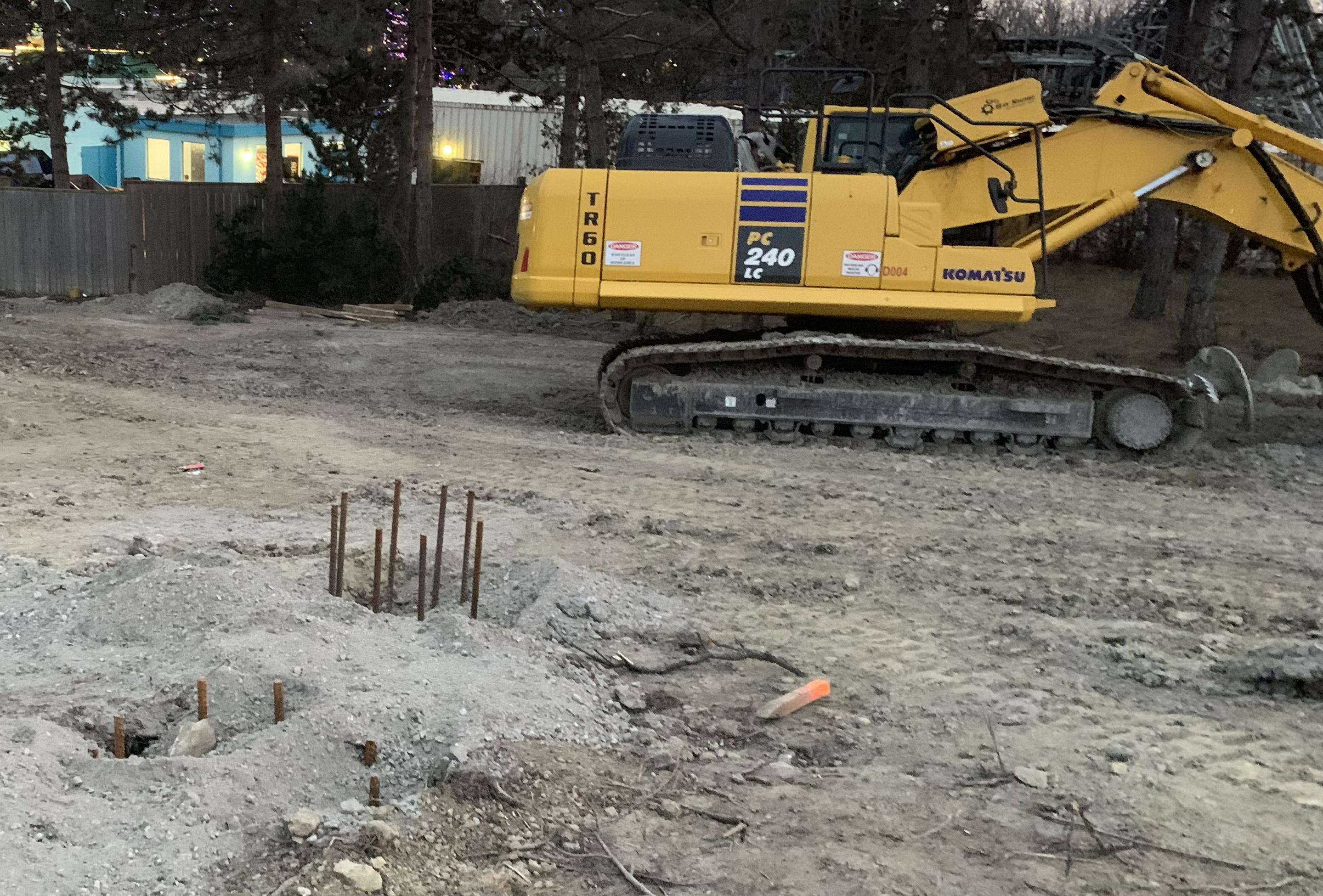
Rebar in place for Snoopy's Racing Railway at Canada's Wonderland
