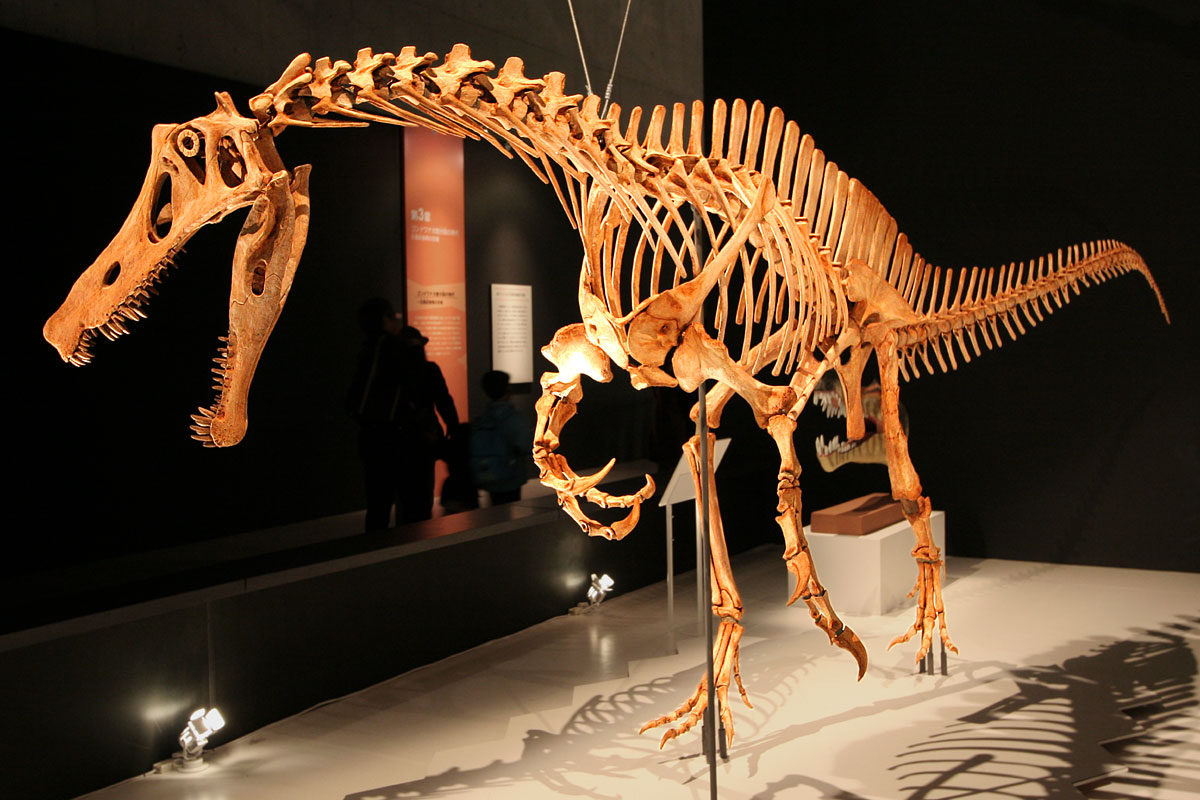
- Reconstructed skeleton at the National Museum of Nature and Science, Tokyo. The postcranium is based on remains that cannot be confidently attributed to the animal.

Scientific classification
- Kingdom: Animalia
- Phylum: Chordata
- Class: Reptilia
- Clade: Dinosauria
- Clade: Saurischia
- Clade: Theropoda
- Family: †Spinosauridae
- Subfamily: †Spinosaurinae
- Genus: †Irritator; Martill et al., 1996

Type species
- †Irritator challengeri Martill et al., 1996

Synonyms
- Angaturama limai? Kellner & Campos 1996

= Irritator =

Irritator Temporal range: Albian ~113–110 Ma

Spinosaurid theropod dinosaur genus from the Early Cretaceous Period

Irritator is a genus of spinosaurid dinosaur that lived in what is now Brazil during the Albian stage of the Early Cretaceous Period, about 113 to 110 million years ago. It is known from a nearly complete skull found in the Romualdo Formation of the Araripe Basin. Fossil dealers had acquired this skull and sold it to the State Museum of Natural History Stuttgart. It was the subject of an ongoing international restitution dispute between Germany and Brazil, until its announcement of return to Brazil in 2026. In 1996, the specimen became the holotype of the type species Irritator challengeri. The genus name comes from the word "irritation", reflecting the feelings of paleontologists who found the skull had been heavily damaged and altered by the collectors. The species name is a homage to the fictional character Professor Challenger from Arthur Conan Doyle's novels.

Some paleontologists regard Angaturama limai—known from a snout tip that was described a few weeks later also in 1996—as a potential junior synonym of Irritator. Both animals hail from the same stratigraphic units of the Araripe Basin. It was also previously proposed that Irritator and Angaturama's skull parts belonged to the same specimen. Although this has been cast into doubt, more overlapping fossil material is needed to confirm whether they are the same animal or not. Other spinosaurid skeletal material, some of which could belong to Irritator or Angaturama, was retrieved from the Romualdo Formation, allowing for a replica skeleton to be made and mounted for display at the National Museum of Rio de Janeiro in 2009.

Estimated at between 6 and 8 meters (20 and 26 ft) in length, Irritator weighed around 1 tonne (1.1 short tons), making it one of the smallest spinosaurids known. Its long, shallow and slender snout was lined with straight and unserrated conical teeth. Lengthwise atop the head ran a thin sagittal crest, to which powerful neck muscles were likely anchored. The nostrils were positioned far back from the tip of the snout, and a rigid secondary palate on the roof of the mouth would have strengthened the jaw when feeding. Belonging to a subadult, Irritator challengeri's holotype remains the most completely preserved spinosaurid skull yet found. The Angaturama snout tip expanded to the sides in a rosette-like shape, bearing long teeth and an unusually tall crest. One possible skeleton indicates it, like other spinosaurids, had enlarged first-finger claws and a sail running down its back.

Irritator had been mistaken initially for a pterosaur, and later a maniraptoran dinosaur. In 1996, the animal was identified as a spinosaurid theropod. The holotype skull was thoroughly prepared before being redescribed in 2002, confirming this classification. Both Irritator and Angaturama belong to the Spinosaurinae subfamily. A generalist diet—like that of today's crocodilians—has been suggested; Irritator might have preyed mainly on fish and any other small prey animals it could catch. Fossil evidence is known of an individual that ate a pterosaur, either from hunting or scavenging it. Irritator may have had semiaquatic habits, and inhabited the tropical environment of a coastal lagoon surrounded by dry regions. It coexisted with other carnivorous theropods as well as turtles, crocodyliforms, and a large number of pterosaur and fish species.

== History of research ==
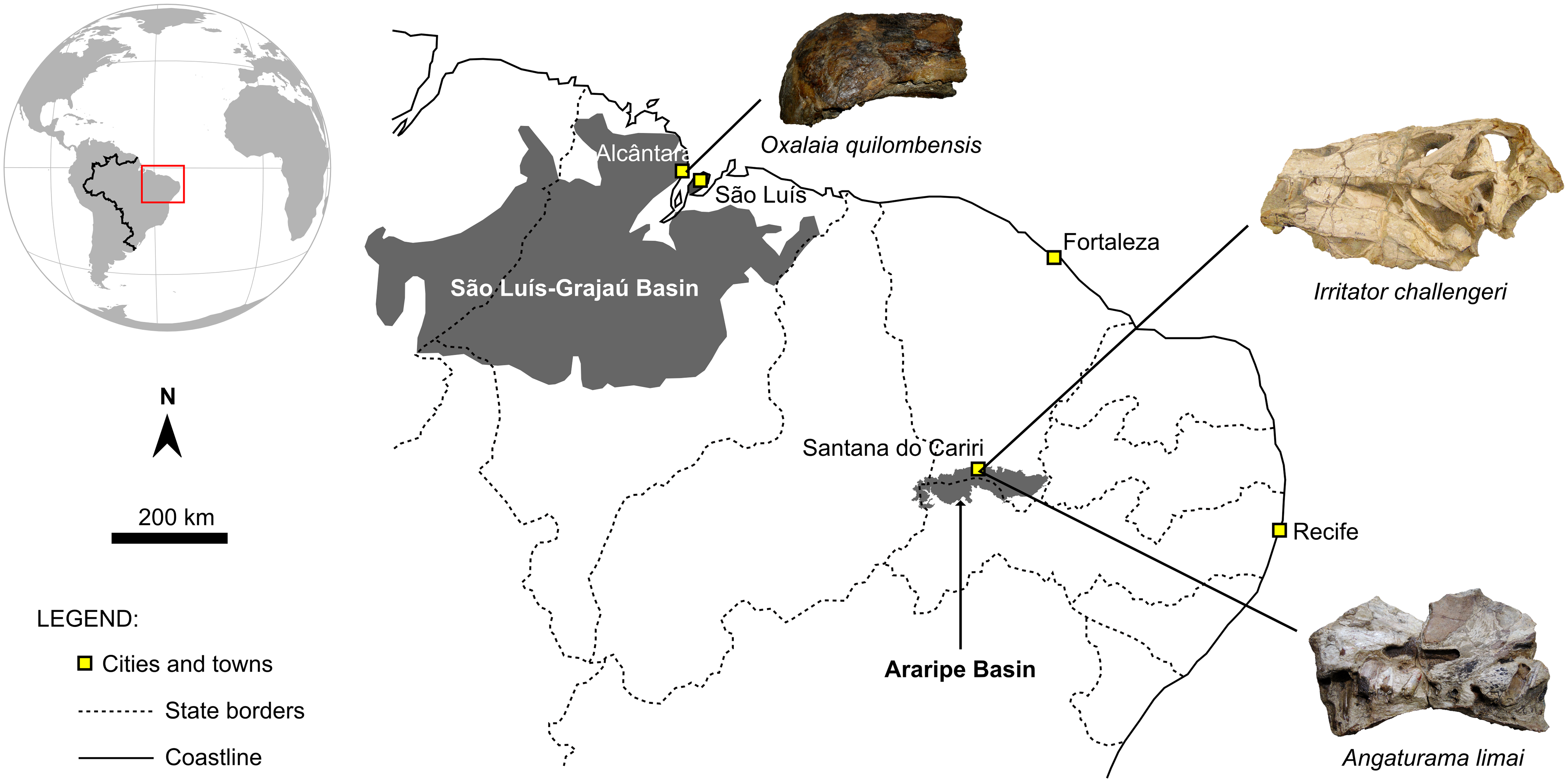
Map showing the Northeast Region of Brazil, with the discovery sites of three spinosaurine fossil specimens in the Araripe and São Luís-Grajaú Basins marked. From top to bottom: Oxalaia, Irritator, and Angaturama

The holotype of Irritator was excavated from a chalk concretion containing the rear of a large skull with lower jaws near the town of Santana do Cariri in northeastern Brazil. This fossil was acquired by fossil traffickers and taken to the State Museum of Natural History in Stuttgart, Germany. At the time it was assumed to be the skull of a giant basal pterosaur, or flying reptile, since the Chapada do Araripe region is famous for its copious pterosaur finds, and the German museum often bought such pieces. As it promised to be a unique discovery of singular importance, German and British pterosaur experts were contacted to study the exemplar. A paper describing it as a pterosaur had already been submitted for publication when the authors, German paleontologist Eberhard Frey and British paleontologist David Martill, were disabused of this notion by the peer reviewers, who suggested the fossil belonged to a theropod dinosaur.

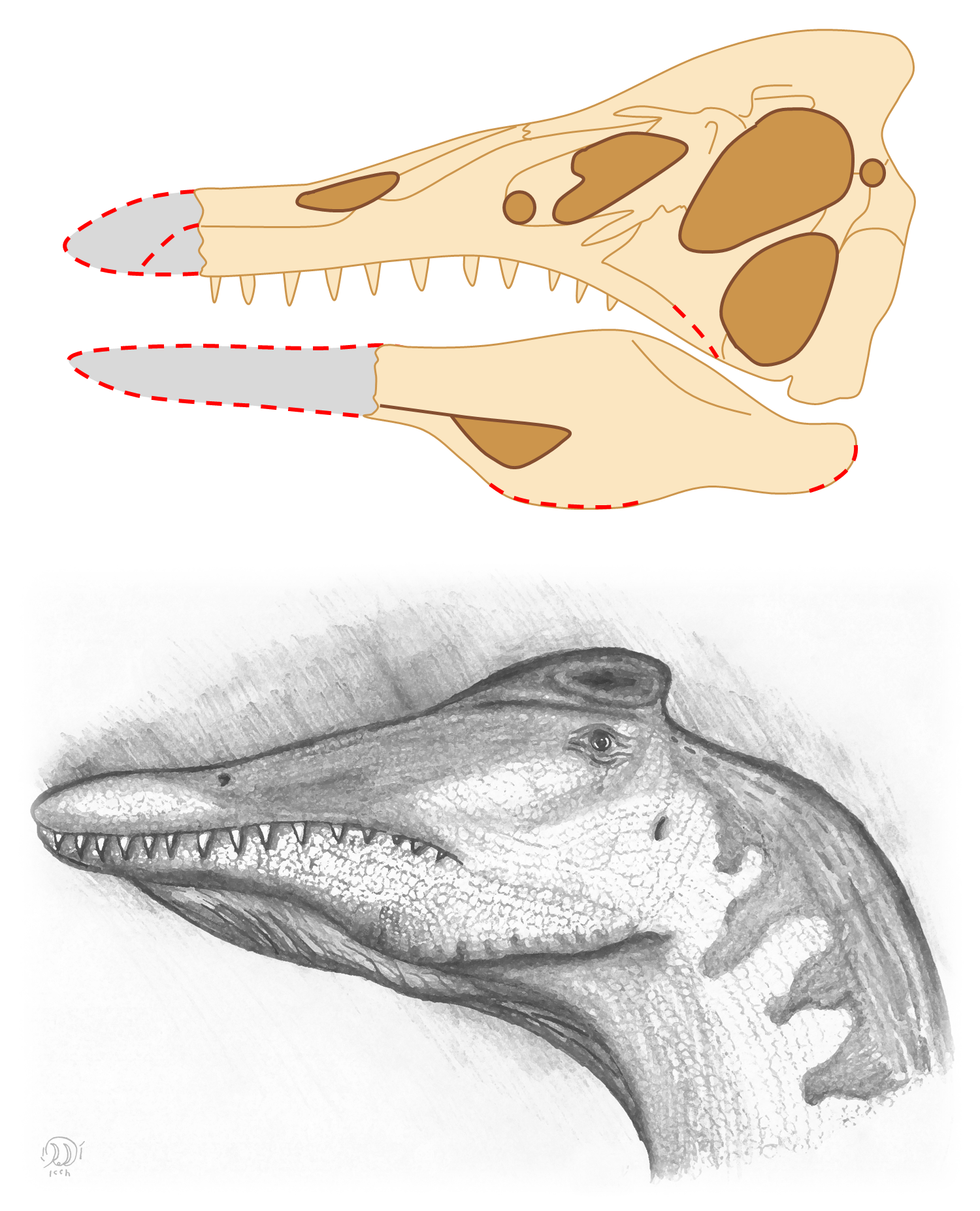
Outdated reconstruction of the holotype skull (top) based on the interpretations of Martill and colleagues in 1996. Depictions (similar to the one at the bottom) based on this reconstruction were later featured in many dinosaur books and encyclopedias.

The skull was flattened sideways somewhat and, as is common with fossils, was partly crushed. The right side was well preserved, while the left was extensively damaged during collection. Some of the skull's hindmost upper surface had eroded, and the lower jaw lacked its front end, both owing to breakage during fossilization. Parts of the specimen were also cracked due to being part of a septarian concretion. The tip of the upper jaw was also missing. Since there were no signs of erosion, it had most probably broken off during or after the fossil's collection. Evident corrosion on certain bones indicates acid preparation had been attempted. A vertical fracture was present across the middle of the skull, which had apparently been sealed with car body filler. In hopes of making it look more complete and valuable, the fossil traders had severely obscured the skull beneath plaster; a widespread practice among local collectors in the Chapada do Araripe, especially on fish fossils. The buyers were unaware of the modifications to the specimen until it was sent to universities in the United Kingdom for CT scan imaging. This revealed the collectors had tried to reconstruct the skull by grafting parts of the maxilla (main upper jaw bone) onto the front of the rostrum (snout). The skull (designated SMNS 58022) became the holotype specimen of the new genus and species Irritator challengeri in February 1996, when it was first scientifically described by paleontologists David M. Martill, Arthur R.I. Cruickshank, Eberhard Frey, Philip G. Small and Maria Clarke. In this paper, Martill and his team wrote that the generic name Irritator came "from irritation, the feeling the authors felt (understated here) when discovering that the snout had been artificially elongated." The type species, Irritator challengeri, was named after Professor Challenger, a character in Arthur Conan Doyle's novels, specifically The Lost World. Two years earlier, Frey and Martill had named a new pterosaur species from the Crato Formation Arthurdactylus conandoylei, after the novelist himself.

When Martill and colleagues first described Irritator challengeri, the holotype was still extensively encased in calcareous rock matrix. Under the supervision of American paleontologist Hans-Dieter Sues, technician Diane M. Scott from the University of Toronto Mississauga assumed the task of fully extracting the skull bones from the rock, allowing for a detailed redescription in 2002. Published by Sues, Frey, Martill, and Scott, this inspection of the now fully prepared specimen negated many of Martill and colleagues' original observations, which were based on misinterpretations of the damaged and largely concealed skull. The estimated length of the complete skull was 24 cm (9.4 in) shorter than previously proposed. What was originally thought to be a prominent head crest proved to be an unattached, indeterminate bone fragment. As in the previous study, Sues and colleagues regarded the African and possibly South American genus Spinosaurus as the most similar taxon to Irritator, because they shared many dental features, including mostly straight conical tooth crowns, thin enamel, well-defined edges with no serrations, and lengthwise fluting. Since little was known of Spinosaurus's skull at the time, these similarities were enough for the authors to suggest a possible junior synonymy of Irritator with Spinosaurus. Sues and colleagues noted that more overlapping skull material was needed for further diagnosis. As more of Spinosaurus's skull became known, later research maintained separation of the two taxa.

Although the site of discovery is uncertain due to it having been trafficked out of Brazil and the lack of provenance documentation presented in the species description, the specimen most probably stems from the Romualdo Formation (previously designated the Romualdo Member of the then Santana Formation). This assignment was confirmed by microfossils of the ostracod Pattersoncypris, and fish scales from the ichthyodectid Cladocyclus, both found in the Romualdo Formation. Questioning of local fossil dealers hinted at a locality near the village of Buxexé close to Santana Do Cariri at the flank of the Chapada do Araripe, at a height of approximately 650 meters (2,130 ft). Since the Romualdo Formation is indeed exposed there, and the matrix encasing the holotype has the same color and texture as those rocks, this locality can be regarded as the probable site of the discovery of the fossil. Irritator challengeri was the first dinosaur described from the Romualdo Formation, and its holotype specimen represents the most completely preserved spinosaurid skull known.

=== Synonymy with Angaturama ===
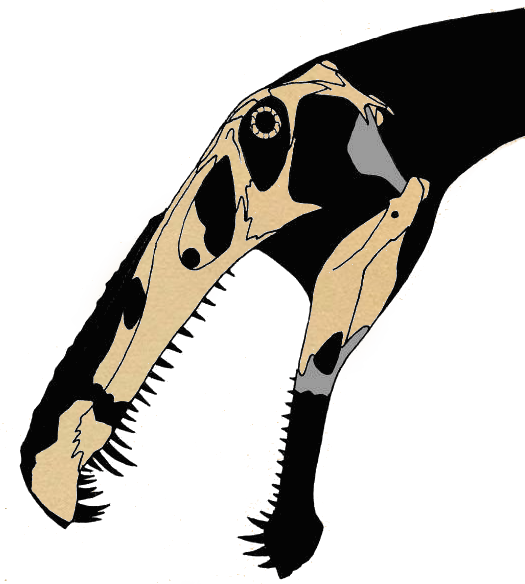
Known skull elements of Irritator as interpreted by paleontologist Jaime A. Headden; the snout tip is from the Angaturama specimen.

Angaturama limai, another spinosaurid from the same time and place as Irritator challengeri, was described by the Brazilian paleontologists Alexander W. A. Kellner and Diogenes de Almeida Campos in February 1996. Kept today under specimen number USP GP/2T-5 at the University of São Paulo, the holotype specimen consists of an isolated snout tip from the Romualdo Formation. It was extracted from a calcareous nodule using a technique originally developed for pterosaur fossils. The generic name Angaturama means "noble" in the aboriginal Tupi Indian language of Brazil. The specific name honors the late Brazilian paleontologist Murilo R. de Lima, who informed Kellner of the specimen in 1991.

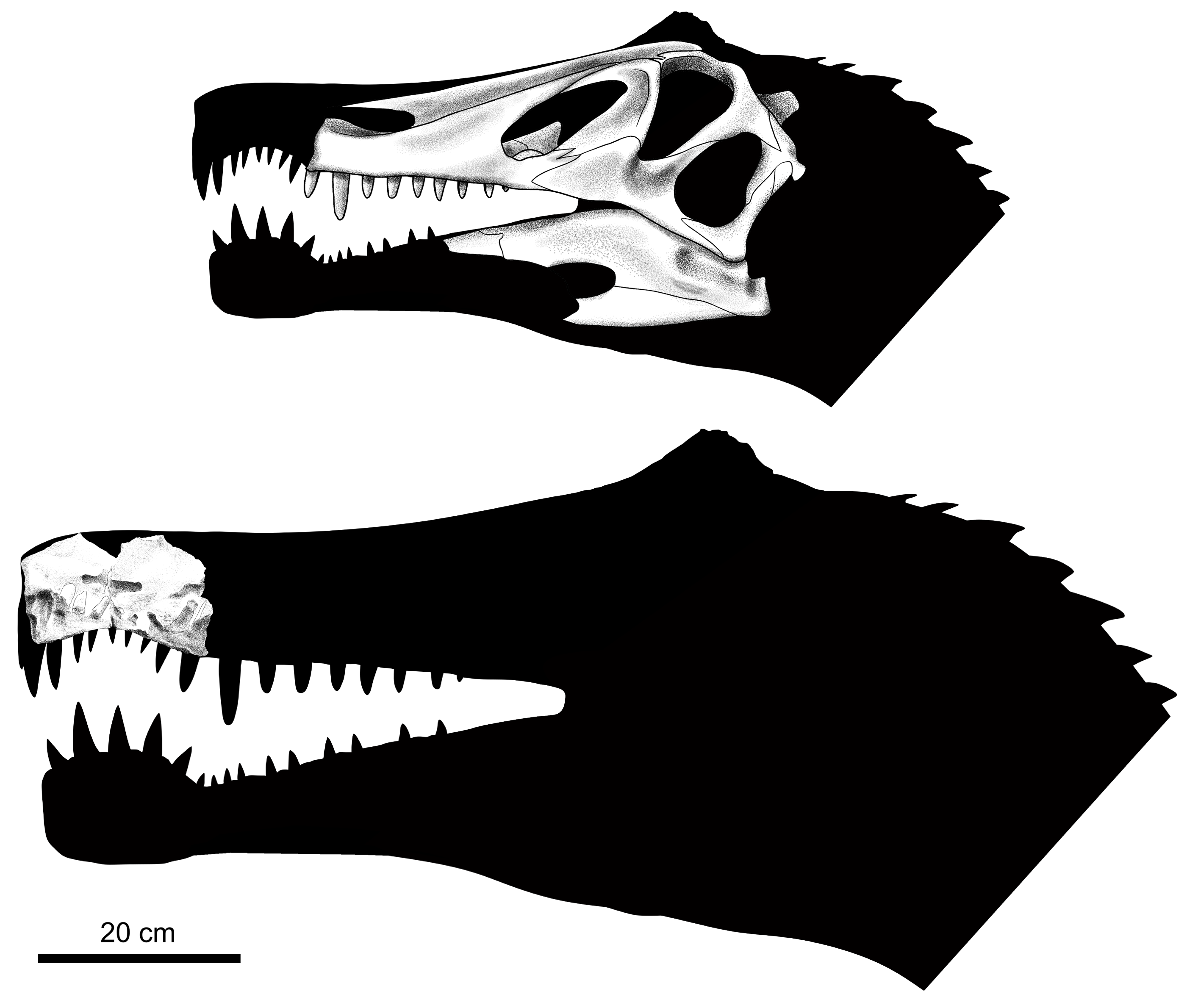
Holotypes of Irritator challengeri and Angaturama limai in place, showing the latter's larger skull size and overlapping third left maxillary tooth, as proposed by Sales and Schultz in 2017

In 1997, British paleontologists Alan J. Charig and Angela C. Milner considered Angaturama a likely junior synonym of Irritator, noting that both genera had retracted nostrils, long jaws, and characteristic spinosaurid dentition. Paul Sereno and colleagues in 1998 agreed with this possibility, and additionally observed that the holotype of Angaturama seems to complete that of Irritator (meaning that they could belong to the same specimen). Authors including Éric Buffetaut and Mohamed Ouaja in 2002, Cristiano Dal Sasso and colleagues in 2005, Tor G. Bertin in 2010, Darren Naish in 2013, and Madani Benyoucef and colleagues in 2015 supported this conclusion. In their redescription of Irritator, Sues and colleagues pointed out that both holotypes are equally as narrow, and share transversely round teeth with defined yet unserrated edges. They also noted that a sagittal crest on Angaturama's premaxillae may correspond with that of Irritator's nasal bones. Some objection has been raised to these assertions. Kellner and Campos in 2000 and Brazilian paleontologist Elaine B. Machado and Kellner in 2005 expressed the opinion that the fossils come from two different genera, and that the holotype of Angaturama limai was clearly more laterally flattened than that of Irritator challengeri.

A review of both fossils by the Brazilian paleontologists Marcos A. F. Sales and Cesar L. Schultz in 2017 noted that the specimens also differ in other aspects of their preservation: the Irritator specimen is brighter in color and is affected by a vertical crack, while the Angaturama specimen bears many cavities; the damage to the teeth of the Irritator challengeri holotype is also much less severe. Sales and Schultz also identified a possible point of overlap, the third left maxillary tooth, and observed that the skull of Angaturama could have been larger than that of Irritator based on the proportions of the closely related genus Baryonyx. Therefore, Sales and Schultz concluded that the two specimens do not belong to the same individual, and that synonymy at the genus level requires verification based on more extensively overlapping remains. If Angaturama and Irritator are regarded as a member of the same genus, the latter would be the valid scientific name under rules of priority, since it was named almost a month earlier. In 2023, German paleontologist Marco Schade and colleagues could not confirm the overlap in tooth positions due to interpreting them differently, and could not provide information to resolve the issue.

=== Postcranial material and additional finds ===
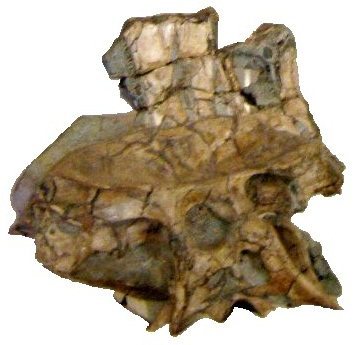
Spinosaurine pelvis and sacral vertebrae (specimen MN 4819-V), National Museum of Rio de Janeiro

Besides the skull, the snout fragment, and some isolated teeth, the Romualdo Formation has also yielded postcranial remains that may belong to spinosaurids, many of which are hitherto undescribed, and all of them pertaining to the Spinosaurinae subfamily. In 2004, parts of a spinal column (MN 4743-V) were unearthed at the formation. Brazilian paleontologist Jonathas Bittencourt and Kellner assigned these, due to their structure, to the Spinosauridae. It is uncertain whether this specimen can be referred to Irritator or Angaturama, given that both are based only on skull material. In 2007, Machado and Kellner tentatively referred a rib fragment (MN 7021-V) to the Spinosauridae. However, the most complete spinosaur specimen retrieved from the Romualdo Formation is MN 4819-V, a partial skeleton lacking the skull. First reported in 1991, the specimen was referred by Kellner to the Spinosauridae in 2001 because of its tall sacral neural spines and the enlarged condition of the hand claw. The skeleton was fully described in 2010 in an as-of-yet unpublished master's thesis by Machado. An incomplete hind limb (MPSC R-2089) mentioned in 2011 might also pertain to the Spinosauridae. In 2018, Tito Aureliano and his team described LPP-PV-0042, part of a left tibia from a particularly large individual. As is common with fossils from the Araripe Basin, the majority of spinosaurid material from the Romualdo Formation was collected under uncontrolled circumstances for use in the illegal fossil trade. As such, many specimens are partly damaged and without precise geological field data.

Some of the Romualdo Formation postcrania were used as the basis for the creation of a replica Angaturama skeleton, later mounted at the Federal University-owned Museu Nacional do Rio de Janeiro (National Museum of Rio de Janeiro). The skeleton depicted the animal carrying an anhanguerid pterosaur in its jaws. It was the centerpiece of the Dinossauros no Sertão (Dinosaurs of Sertão) exhibit, which opened to the public in March 2009, becoming the first large carnivorous Brazilian dinosaur to be put on display. Some of the original postcranial elements (including the fossil pelvis and sacral vertebrae) were presented alongside the mount. In press releases of the exhibit's opening, Kellner informally implied MN 4819-V as belonging to Angaturama. This is also reflected in the specimen's inclusion in the skeletal mount. In 2011, a third Brazilian spinosaur, Oxalaia quilombensis, was named and described from the Alcântara Formation of the Itapecuru Group, part of the São Luís Basin. This larger species, known only from an isolated snout tip and upper jaw fragment, lived during the Cenomanian stage, around six to nine million years after Irritator and Angaturama. Oxalaia quilombensis is differentiated from Angaturama limai by its broader, more rounded snout and lack of a sagittal crest on the premaxillae. In September 2018, a fire broke out at the palace housing the Museu Nacional, largely destroying the fossil collections and possibly the exhibited Angaturama skeleton and fossil elements. The holotype of Oxalaia quilombensis, which was stored in the same building, was thought to have been destroyed. Luckily, the Oxalaia holotype, while heavily damaged, was recovered.

== Description ==
Estimated size of Irritator (light green) and Angaturama's (dark green) holotype specimens with a human

Even by maximal size estimates, Irritator was smaller than other known spinosaurids. Gregory S. Paul calculated its length at 7.5 meters (25 ft) and weight at 1 tonne (1.1 short tons). Thomas R. Holtz Jr. published a higher estimate of 8 meters (26 ft), with a weight between 0.9 to 3.6 tonnes (0.99 to 3.97 short tons). Estimates by Dougal Dixon were lower at 6 meters (20 ft) long and 2 meters (6.6 ft) high. When scaled by Aureliano and colleagues, the reconstructions from the study by Sales and Schultz provided a length of 6.5 meters (21 ft) for the Irritator challengeri holotype, and 8.3 meters (27 ft) for the Angaturama limai holotype. Some of the skull bones of the former holotype had not yet fully co-ossified (fused), indicating that the specimen belonged to a subadult. The partial spinosaurine skeleton MN 4819-V represented a moderately sized individual, estimated by Machado at 5 to 6 meters (16 to 20 ft) in length. Many elements from this specimen were incorporated into the skeletal mount in the National Museum of Rio de Janeiro, which had a length of 6 meters (20 ft) and a height of 2 meters (6.6 ft). However, spinosaurids from the Romualdo Formation possibly attained greater sizes. Although LPP-PV-0042 is represented only by a tibia fragment, Aureliano and colleagues estimated its length at roughly 10 meters (33 ft). Bone histology indicates that this individual was a subadult, so the mature animal may have been larger.

=== Anatomy of the Irritator challengeri holotype ===
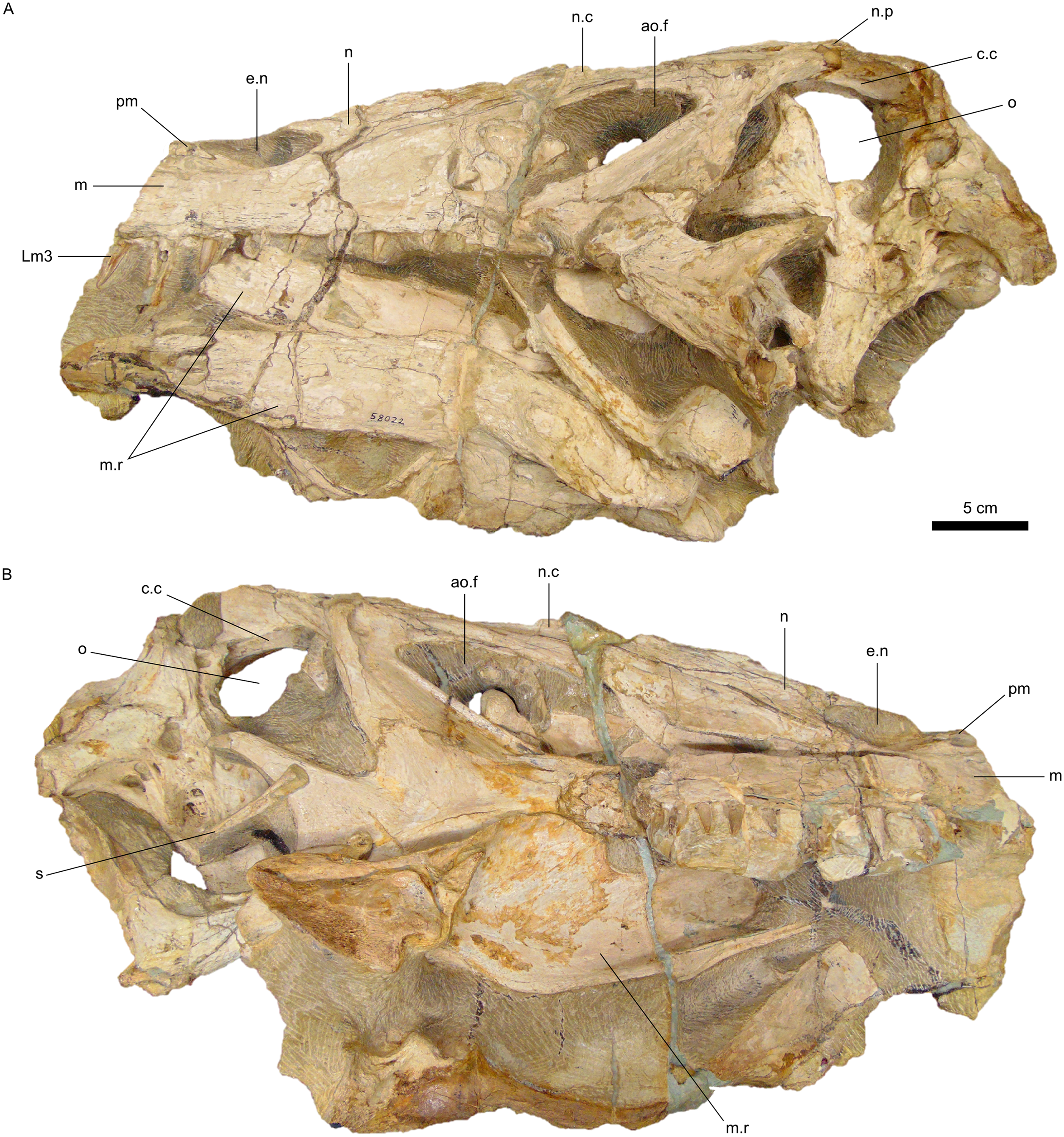
Holotype skull of Irritator challengeri from left (top) and right side views

The holotype skull of Irritator challengeri, although heavily damaged in certain places, is largely complete; missing only the tip of the snout and the front of the mandible. The preserved skull is 16.5 cm (6.5 in) tall and 10 cm (3.9 in) wide, its full length has been estimated at 60 cm (24 in), based on comparisons with Baryonyx. Irritator's skull was long, narrow, and somewhat triangular in cross section. The braincase was inclined backwards, and deeper than it was long. Extending from it was an elongate and low snout, with both sides relatively flat and slightly angled towards the skull midline. Only the rear ends of the paired premaxillae (frontmost snout bones) remain intact, forming the front upper and lower borders of the external nares (bony nostrils). As in all spinosaurids, the maxillae (main upper jaw bones) extended below and past the nostrils in a long, low branch that formed the lower border of this opening, consequently separating the premaxillae and nasal bones in that location. Irritator's maxillary sinuses (located in the body of the maxillae) bore a large oval opening, as in Allosaurus. The nostril openings were oval and, as in all spinosaurids, positioned farther back on the skull than in typical theropods. Irritator's nostrils were both proportionately and absolutely smaller than in Suchomimus and Baryonyx, but larger than those of Spinosaurus. The opening behind the orbit (eye socket), the lateral temporal fenestra, was very large, while the antorbital fenestra, in front of the eyes, was long and elliptical. The orbit itself was deep and wider at the top (where the eyeball was placed) than the bottom. The lacrimal bone separated the orbit from the antorbital fenestra, forming the upper and lower rear margins of the latter with two processes that enclosed a 40-degree angle; similar to Baryonyx, where it enclosed 35 degrees. Unlike in Baryonyx, Irritator's lacrimal did not form a bony horn core. The prefrontal bones were large and sturdy, while the thinner frontal bones, situated behind them, were smooth and concave on top; both of these bones formed the upper rim of the orbit.

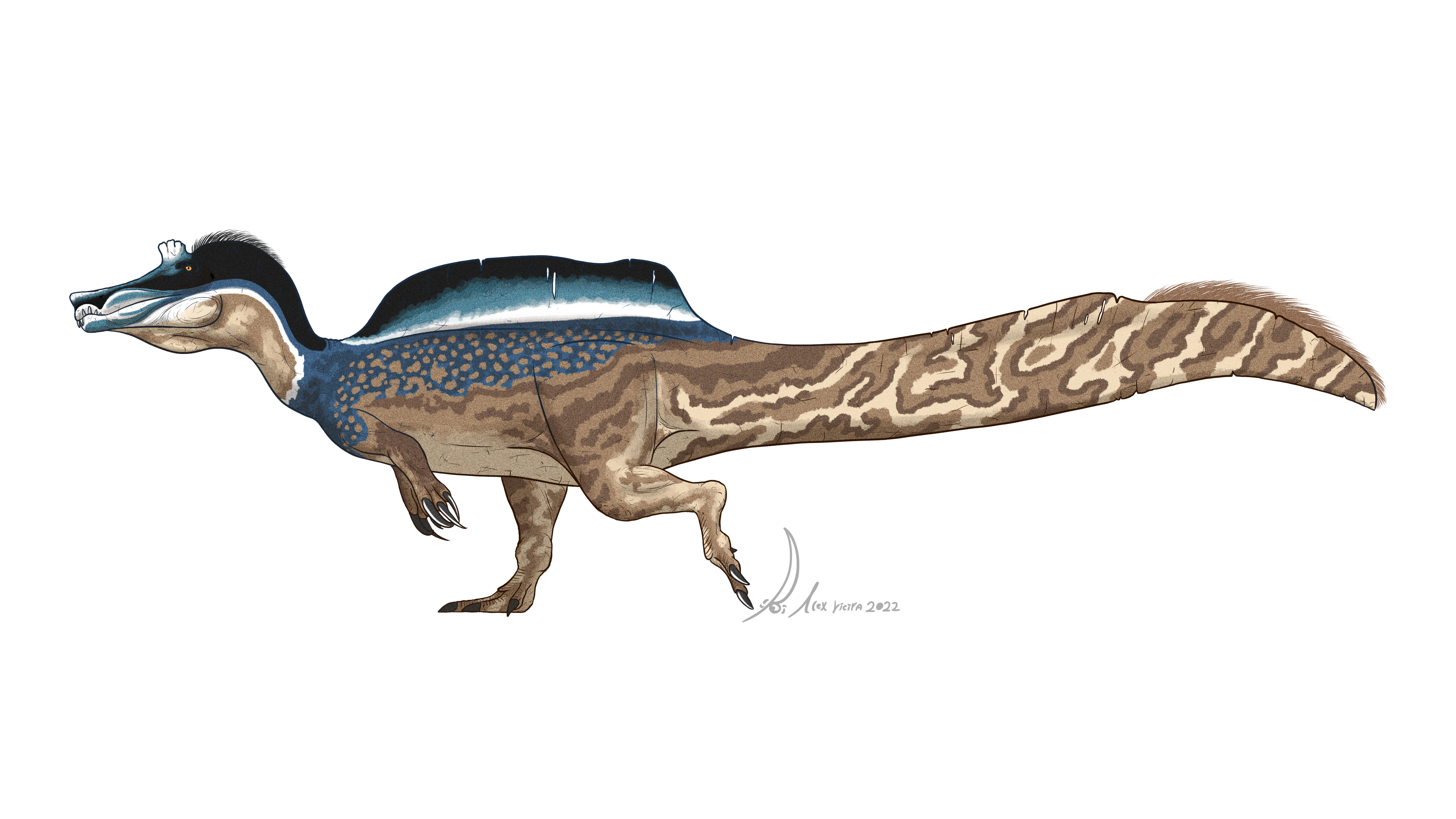
Life restoration of Irritator

A thin sagittal crest, constructed from the elongate nasal bones, extended along the skull midline before stopping just above the eye in a slightly flattened bulge. Although the complete shape and height of this structure is unknown in Irritator, these head crests were commonplace in spinosaurids, having possibly served a display function when the animal was alive. The preserved part of Irritator's crest is deepest above the antorbital fenestra and lacks the vertical ridges seen in the crest of Spinosaurus. Like others in its family, Irritator possessed a long and bony structure on the roof of its mouth called a secondary palate, separating the oral from the nasal cavity. This is a feature observed in extant crocodilians, but absent in most theropod dinosaurs. Also like its relatives, Irritator had two additional openings on the skull roof (called the postnasal fenestrae) as well as long and only partially diverging basipterygoid processes (bony extensions connecting the braincase with the palate). The back of the lower jaw was deep, its rear upper surface consisting mainly of the large surangular bone, which articulated with the shallower angular bone below it. The mandibular fenestra, a sideways-facing opening in the lower jaw, was oval and comparatively large. The dentary (tooth-bearing bone of the mandible) is unknown in Irritator, save for a possible remnant at the front of the surangular. Irritator challengeri's holotype is unique in that it is one of the few non-avian dinosaur fossils found with a preserved stapes.

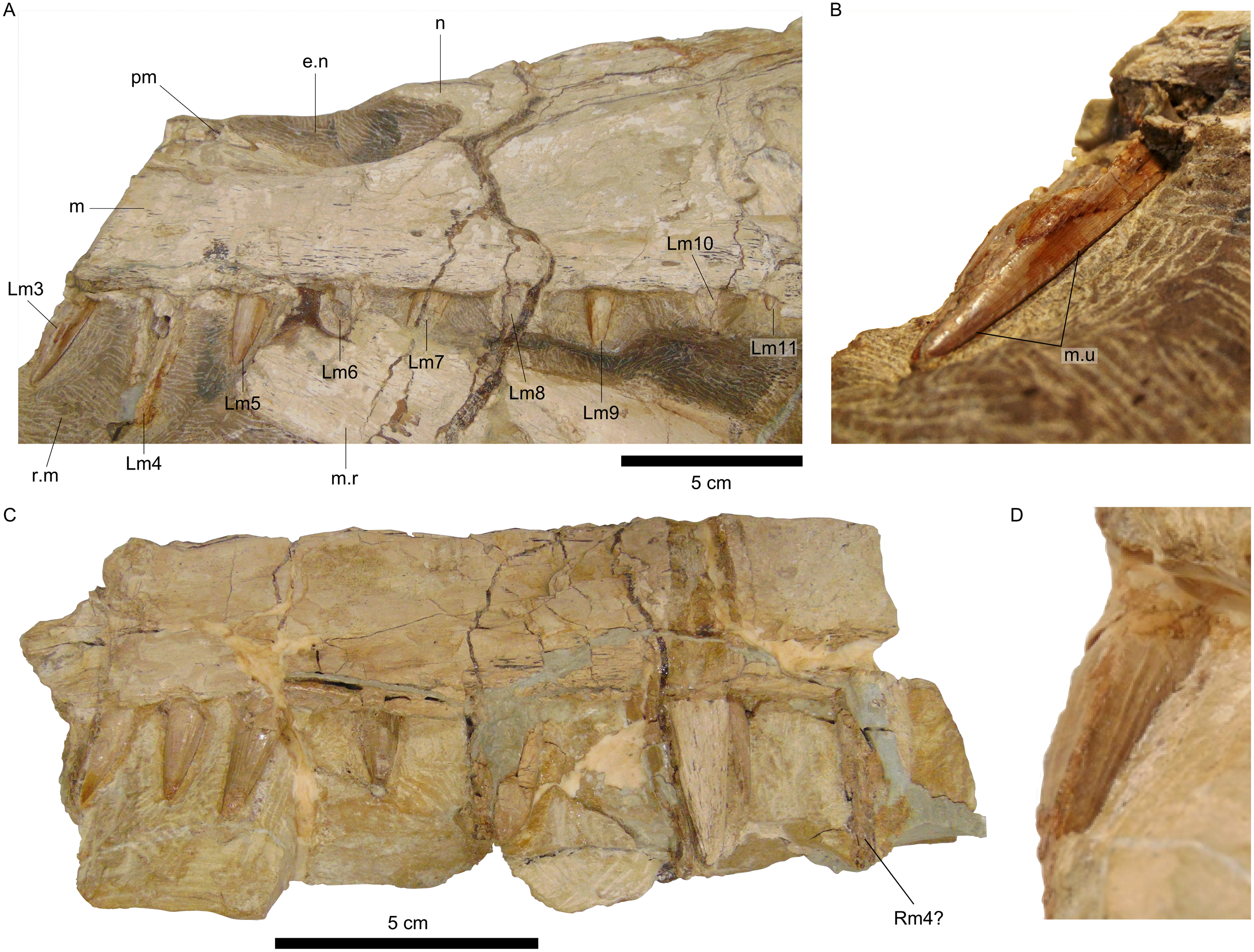
Closeup of Irritator's upper jaw and dentition

Irritator had straight or only faintly recurved conical teeth, bearing sharply defined but unserrated edges. Flutes (lengthwise ridges) were present on its tooth crowns, a common dental trait among spinosaurids. Both sides of Irritator's teeth were fluted, as in Spinosaurus, whereas Baryonyx exhibited them only on the lingual (inward facing) side of its teeth. Irritator's teeth were circular in cross section, as opposed to the laterally flattened condition of most theropod teeth. The enamel (first layer of the teeth) was thin, with a finely wrinkled texture also observed in Baryonyx. Both of Irritator's maxillae preserve nine teeth, although the left maxilla's tooth crowns are more intact, and there are traces of a tenth tooth in the rock matrix. The teeth were deeply inserted into the jaw and widely spaced towards the front of the maxilla. The first and second preserved maxillary teeth were the largest, at 32 mm (1.3 in) and 40 mm (1.6 in) in crown length. The seven remaining teeth became progressively smaller towards the rear, one of the last ones measuring 6 mm (0.24 in) in estimated crown length. CT scans performed on the specimen revealed replacement teeth on both sides of the upper jaw. Their roots ran deep into the maxillae and converged close to the midline, nearly reaching the top of the skull. Based on comparisons with Irritator's relatives, the maxillae were probably lined with a total of 11 teeth each, similar to the number of 12 teeth in MSNM V4047, an upper jaw fossil referred to Spinosaurus. The hindmost tooth of the Irritator specimen's left maxilla was not yet fully erupted, and only the tip of it was visible.

=== Anatomy of the Angaturama limai holotype ===
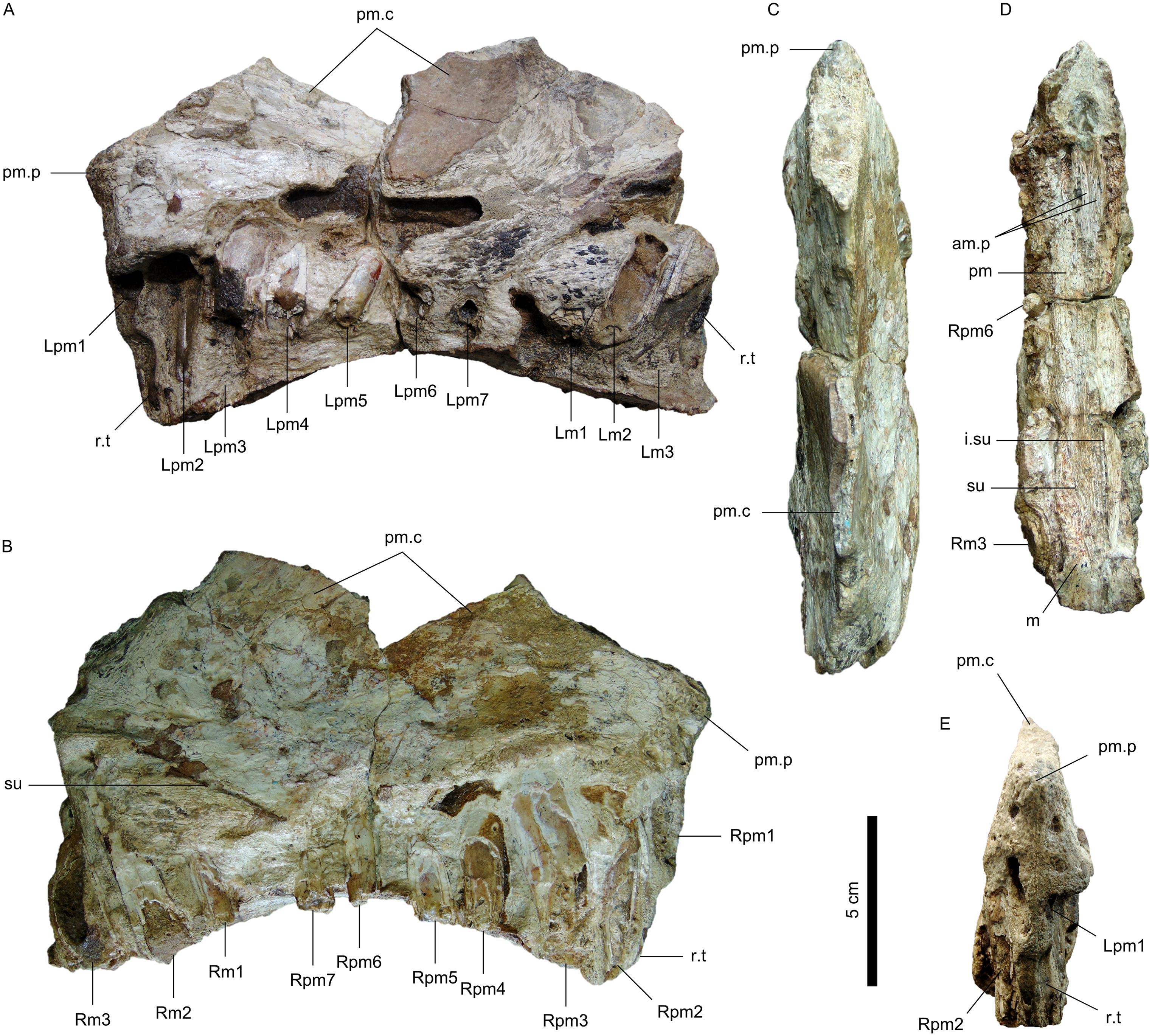
Holotype of Angaturama limai from various angles

The holotype of Angaturama limai consists only of the front part of the upper jaw, comprising the tips of the paired premaxillae and the frontmost ends of the maxillae. The specimen measures 19.2 cm (7.6 in) in height and 11 cm (4.3 in) in length, with the width of the palatal region being 4 to 5 mm (0.16 to 0.20 in). The suture between the maxilla and premaxilla was jagged at the front and straightened out towards the rear. The lower margin of the premaxillae was concave, with the concavity reaching its apex at the sixth premaxillary tooth. The front of the snout was expanded, forming the spoon-shaped terminal rosette characteristic of spinosaurids. This concave underside of the premaxillae would have complemented a convex and enlarged mandible tip. The premaxillae connected with each other on the bottom to form Angaturama's secondary palate, which was also partially contributed to by two processes extending from the maxillae. The snout was strongly compressed laterally, and the premaxillae gently tapered towards the top to form a tall sagittal crest 1 to 2 mm (0.039 to 0.079 in) in thickness. This crest was larger and extended farther forwards on the snout than in other known spinosaurids. The frontmost upper border of the premaxilla had a small bulge that overhung the base of the crest. This bulge was apparently damaged on its upper surface, indicating that the top of the crest may have extended even farther over and forwards from that point. The front of Angaturama's snout hence had a vertically straight or concave margin, atypical from the more smoothly sloping snouts of other spinosaurs.

In the premaxilla, a broken-off tooth with partial tooth crown was recovered. The strongly extended and straight teeth with unserrated conical crowns, which measured 6 to 40 mm (0.24 to 1.57 in) in length, were singly embedded. This indicates continuous tooth replacement where new teeth were pushed up between the old ones. Judging by the alveoli (tooth sockets), the premaxilla had seven teeth altogether, the third tooth being the largest. The frontmost three teeth of the maxilla were also preserved. The premaxillary teeth increased in size from the first to third, shrank from the third to the sixth, and enlarged again from the sixth premaxillary to third maxillary positions. A 16 cm (6.3 in) diastema (gap in tooth row) was present between the last premaxillary and first maxillary tooth.

=== Postcrania ===
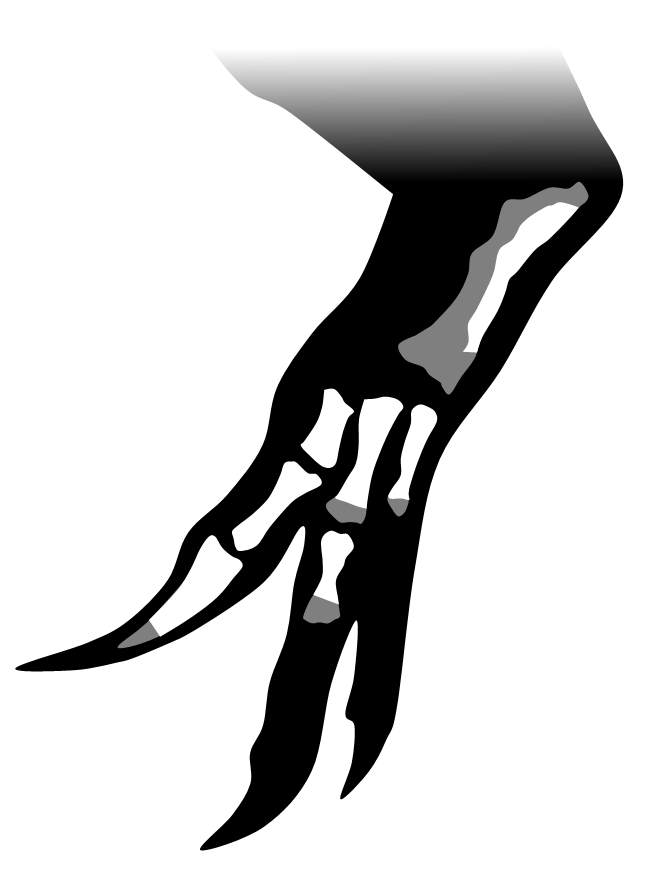
Hand and arm bones of specimen MN 4819-V, the most complete spinosaurid hand known

Though no skeletal remains were discovered with the original Angaturama snout tip, one partial skeleton (MN 4819-V) from a different location may belong to the genus. But since there is no overlapping material between the two specimens, direct comparisons cannot be made. MN 4819-V comprises a largely intact pelvis, some dorsal (back) and caudal (tail) vertebrae, five sacral (hip) vertebrae, a partial right tibia and fibula (shin and calf bones), most of the right femur (thigh bone), and part of an ulna (forearm bone). It also has the most complete hand known from a spinosaurid, including metacarpals, phalanges, one carpals, and one claw. Like in all spinosaurids, the claw of the first finger (the "thumb") was enlarged.

The pelvic bones are well preserved, with the right side better articulated than the left. The fused sacral vertebrae are still attached to the pelvis, which lacks the distal ends of both of its pubic bones and ischia (lower and rearmost hip bones). The ilium (main hip bone) is 55.3 cm (21.8 in) long. The preacetabular ala (front expansion) of the ilium was curved on the bottom and was somewhat shorter and deeper than the postacetabular ala (rear expansion). The preacetabular ala were somewhat enlarged at the front, in contrast to the more slender condition of the postacetabular ala. The brevis fossa (groove at the bottom of the postacetabular ala) was concave, as was the rear margin of the ischium. The pubis bore a relatively large and almost closed obturator notch, an indentation in the lower margin of the rear part of the bone that allowed for the passage of the obturator nerve. The upwards projecting neural spines of the sacrum were elongated, as is typical in spinosaurs. In life, these would have been covered in skin, forming a "sail" down the animal's back. MN 4819-V is distinguished from Suchomimus due to its longer and shallower ilium with a less curved upper margin, and from Baryonyx by having a more developed obturator process, a blade-like structure on the bottom of the ischium.

== Classification ==
Size of various spinosaurids (Irritator in purple, first from left) compared with a human

Martill and his team originally classified Irritator as a maniraptoran dinosaur in the clade Bullatosauria (a group no longer considered monophyletic), as a close relative to the feathered ornithomimosaurs and troodontids. Given that its dental morphology, particularly long snout, and assumed fin-shaped crest were features unknown in "other" maniraptorans, the researchers erected the new family Irritatoridae within the clade. They recognized Irritator's affinities with Spinosaurus, in that they both had similarly shaped and unserrated teeth, but noted that the latter's mandible would not conform with the front of Irritator's upper jaw, and that other non-avian dinosaurs like Compsognathus and Ornitholestes also bore no serrations on some or all of their teeth. Some of these claims were questioned in 1996 by Kellner who found that Irritator's skull lacked the one autapomorphy (distinguishing feature) diagnosed in maniraptorans at the time, which was having its jugal (cheek) bone forming part of the antorbital fenestra. He also pointed out that since Irritator challengeri's holotype lacked the tip of its snout, it would not be possible to know if Spinosaurus's dentary could complement it or not. Based on comparisons with Spinosaurus, Kellner resolved Irritator as a spinosaurid and synonymized Irritatoridae with that family. Irritator was then assigned to the Baryonychidae along with Angaturama, Baryonyx, Suchomimus, and Spinosaurus by Oliver W. M. Rauhut in 2003. Holtz and colleagues in 2004 considered the Baryonychidae synonymous with Spinosauridae, and moved these genera to the latter family. Most later revisions have upheld these classifications. As spinosaurids, Irritator and Angaturama are placed within the superfamily Megalosauroidea, with Spinosauridae being a possible sister taxon to the Megalosauridae.

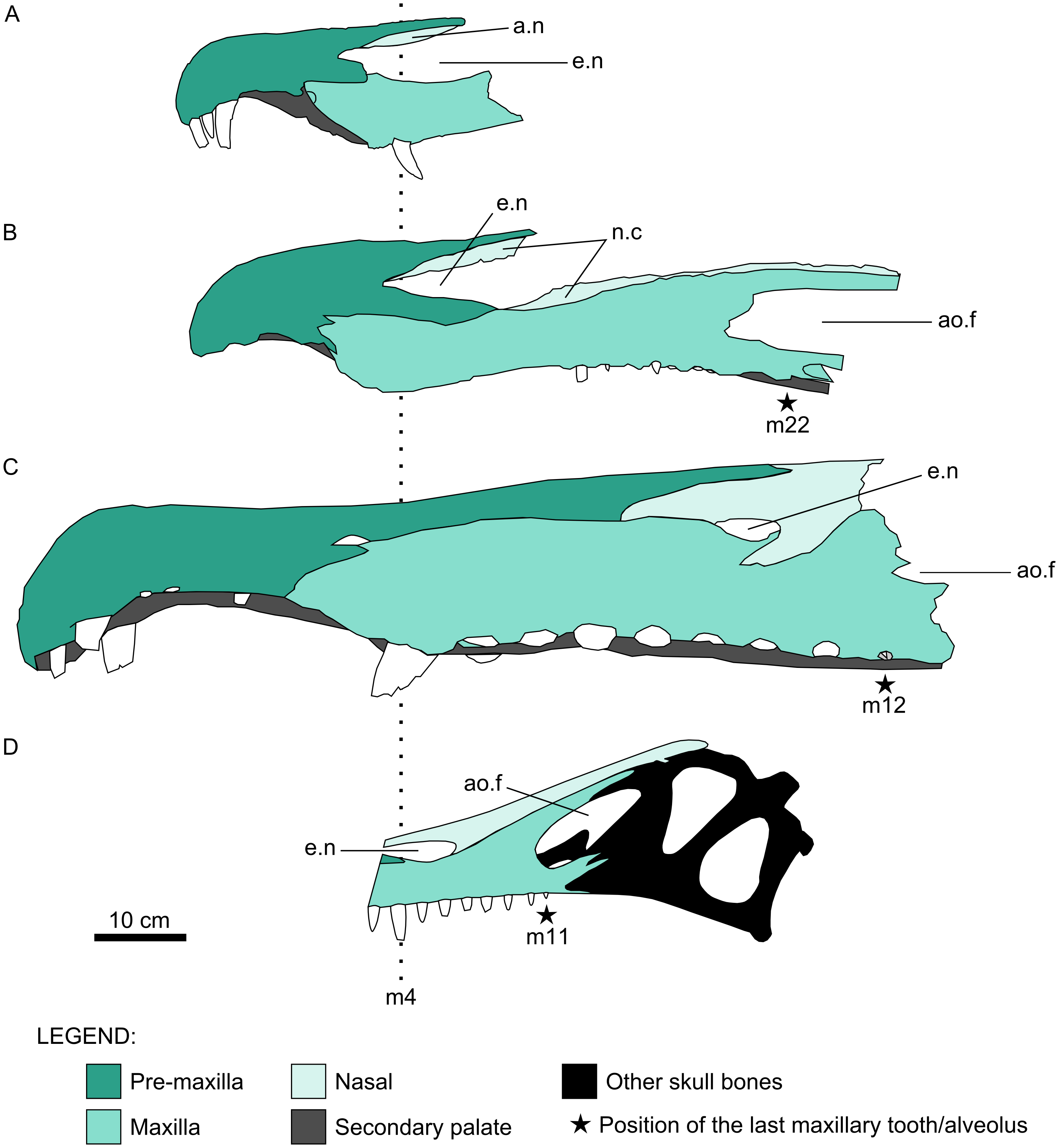
Diagram illustrating skull elements from Irritator (bottom) and other spinosaurids, comparing the relative positions of the external nares, or bony nostrils, (labeled e.n.)

In 1998, Sereno and colleagues defined two subfamilies within the Spinosauridae based on craniodental (skull and tooth) characteristics. They were Spinosaurinae, where they placed Spinosaurus and Irritator; and Baryonychinae, to which they assigned Baryonyx, Suchomimus, and Cristatusaurus. Spinosaurines were distinguished by their unserrated, straighter, and more widely spaced teeth, as well as smaller first teeth of the premaxilla. In 2005, Dal Sasso and colleagues assumed Irritator's nostrils as being located above the middle of the maxillary tooth row; more posteriorly than in baryonychines, but less so than in Spinosaurus. Sales and Schultz in 2017 found that Irritator's nostrils were in fact positioned closer to the front of the jaw, as in Baryonyx and Suchomimus; this more forward nostril placement was typically considered characteristic of baryonychines. Nevertheless, Irritator also bore unserrated teeth, a trait associated with spinosaurines. Sales and Schultz thus noted that the Araripe Basin spinosaurids Irritator and Angaturama might represent intermediate forms between the earlier baryonychines and later spinosaurines, and that further research may eventually render the former a paraphyletic (unnatural) group.

Irritator is further distinguished from Baryonyx, Suchomimus, and Cristatusaurus by having slightly over half as many teeth in the maxilla, and from Spinosaurus due to its comparatively larger and more forwardly positioned nostril openings, which, unlike in Spinosaurus, are also formed by the premaxilla. The narrow sagittal crest, which ends in a knob-like process above the frontals, is another autapomorphy separating Irritator from other spinosaurids. Although Angaturama limai's snout is generally narrower than in other spinosaurids, this might be due to damage sustained by the fossil; the holotype appears partly crushed and broken on its lower margin, with some of the preserved teeth having been sectioned off along their length. Therefore, Angaturama's only valid autapomorphy is its sagittal crest, which extends farther forwards on the rostrum and is more exaggerated than in other known spinosaurid skulls.

Topology A: Benson and colleagues (2009)

- Megalosauroidea
  - Spinosauridae
    - - Baryonyx
      - Suchomimus
    - - Irritator
      - Spinosaurus
  - Megalosauridae

Topology B: Sales and Schultz (2017)

- Spinosauridae
  - Baryonyx
  - Cristatusaurus
  - Suchomimus
  - - Irritator
    - - Oxalaia
      - Spinosaurus

== Paleobiology ==
=== Diet and feeding ===
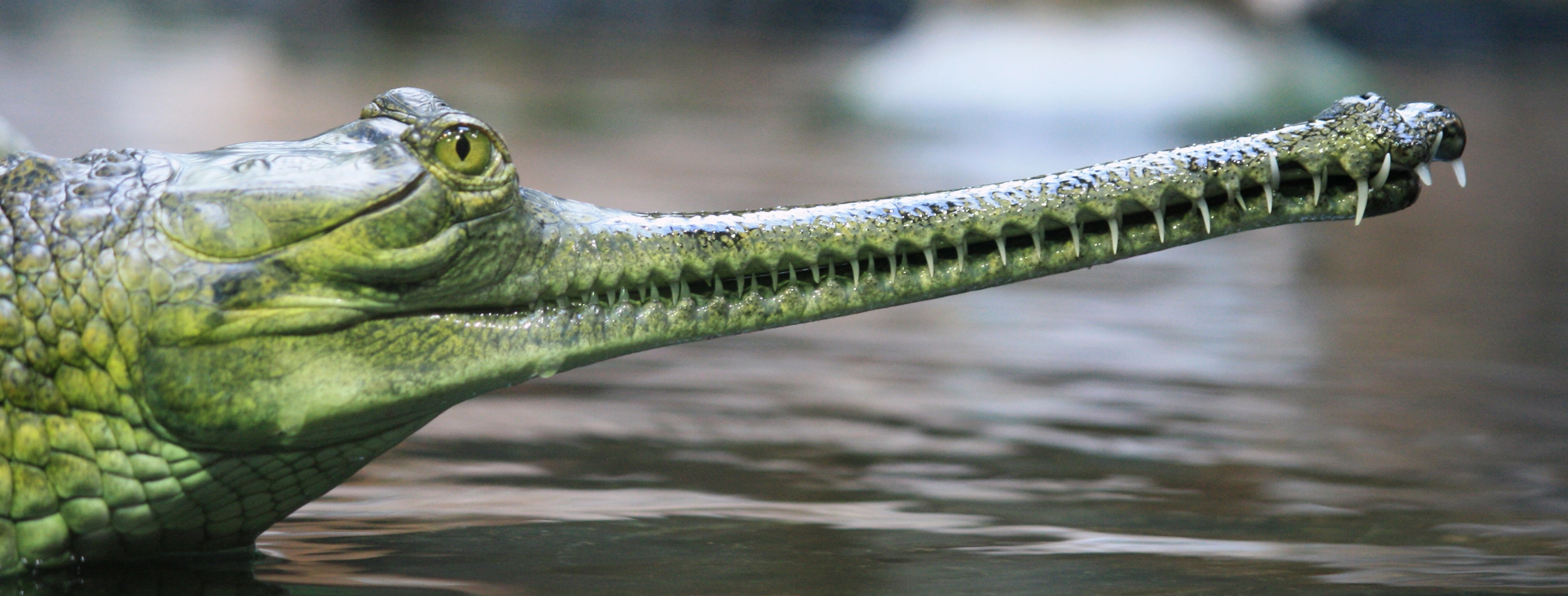
Head of an Indian gharial, which has similarities to the head of Irritator

In 1996, Martill and colleagues theorized that Irritator challengeri, with its elongated snout and unserrated conical teeth, likely had at least a partly piscivorous (fish-eating) diet. Although much of the holotype's morphology turned out to be greatly different than they thought, later studies supported these observations. Spinosaurids had very narrow and elongated jaws with relatively homogeneous pointed teeth, an arrangement found particularly in animals like the Indian gharial—the most piscivorous extant crocodilian. The long conical teeth, which in spinosaurines did not possess serrated edges, were suitable for grabbing and holding prey. They differed from teeth of other theropods, which seemed geared towards tearing or cutting off seized body parts. The dental microwear of Irritator was very smooth and homogenous, indicative of soft food consumption.

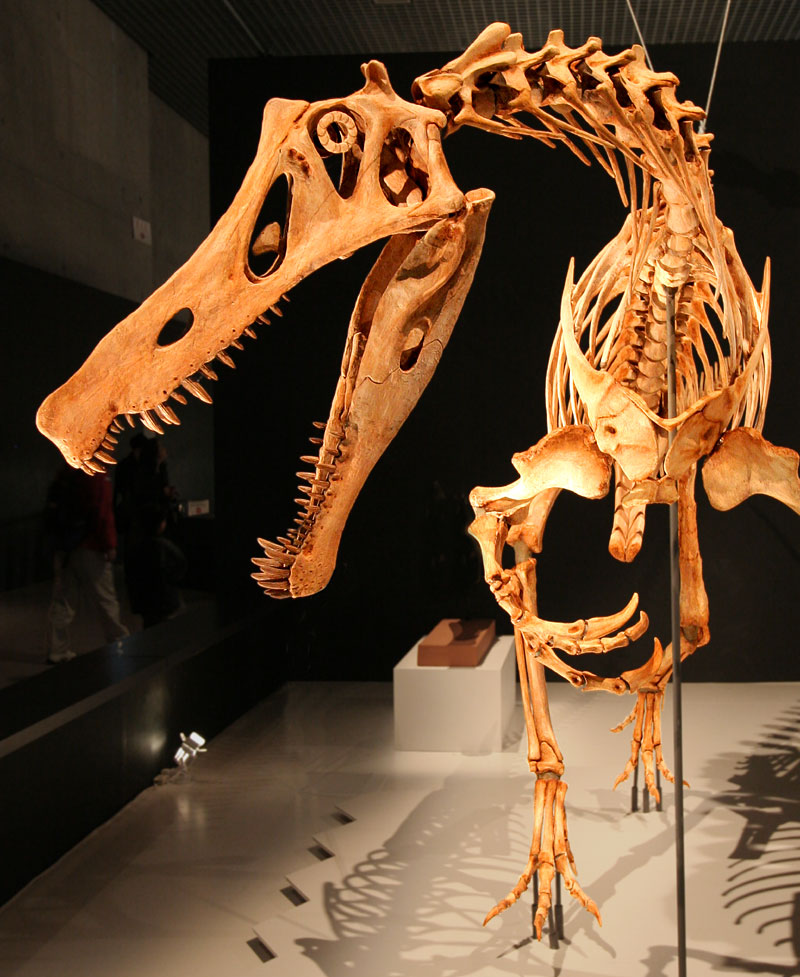
Closeup of reconstructed skull and neck

Irritator shared with crocodilians a stiff secondary palate and reduced antorbital fenestrae. In 2007, a finite-element analysis study by British paleontologist Emily J. Rayfield and colleagues found that these attributes, present in other spinosaurids as well, made the skull more resistant to torsion from prey item loads when feeding. The authors pointed out that in contrast, most theropods lacked secondary palates and had large antorbital fenestrae, exchanging strength for lighter skull builds. The nostrils of Irritator were shifted far back from the snout tip; this, along with the secondary palate, which separated the animal's nasal passages from the inside of its mouth, made respiration possible even if most of the jaw was underwater or held prey. In particular, the sagittal crest of Irritator is an indication for pronounced neck musculature, which would have been necessary to close the jaws quickly against water resistance and withdraw the head rapidly. In 2015, German paleontologist Serjoscha W. Evers and colleagues found evidence for similar adaptations in the African spinosaur Sigilmassasaurus. The neck vertebrae of this genus have a heavily furrowed undersurface. This is consistent with the attachment of powerful neck muscles for use in fishing or rapidly snatching small prey, a trait also observed in extant crocodilians and birds. Sales and Schultz in 2017 found that Irritator and baryonychines might have relied more on their sense of smell for hunting than Spinosaurus did, since they had larger, less retracted nostrils and more room in their skulls for the nasal cavity. Spinosaurus itself probably made heavier use of senses like vision or the mechanoreceptors on the tip of its snout, like those used by crocodilians to sense prey moving in the water.

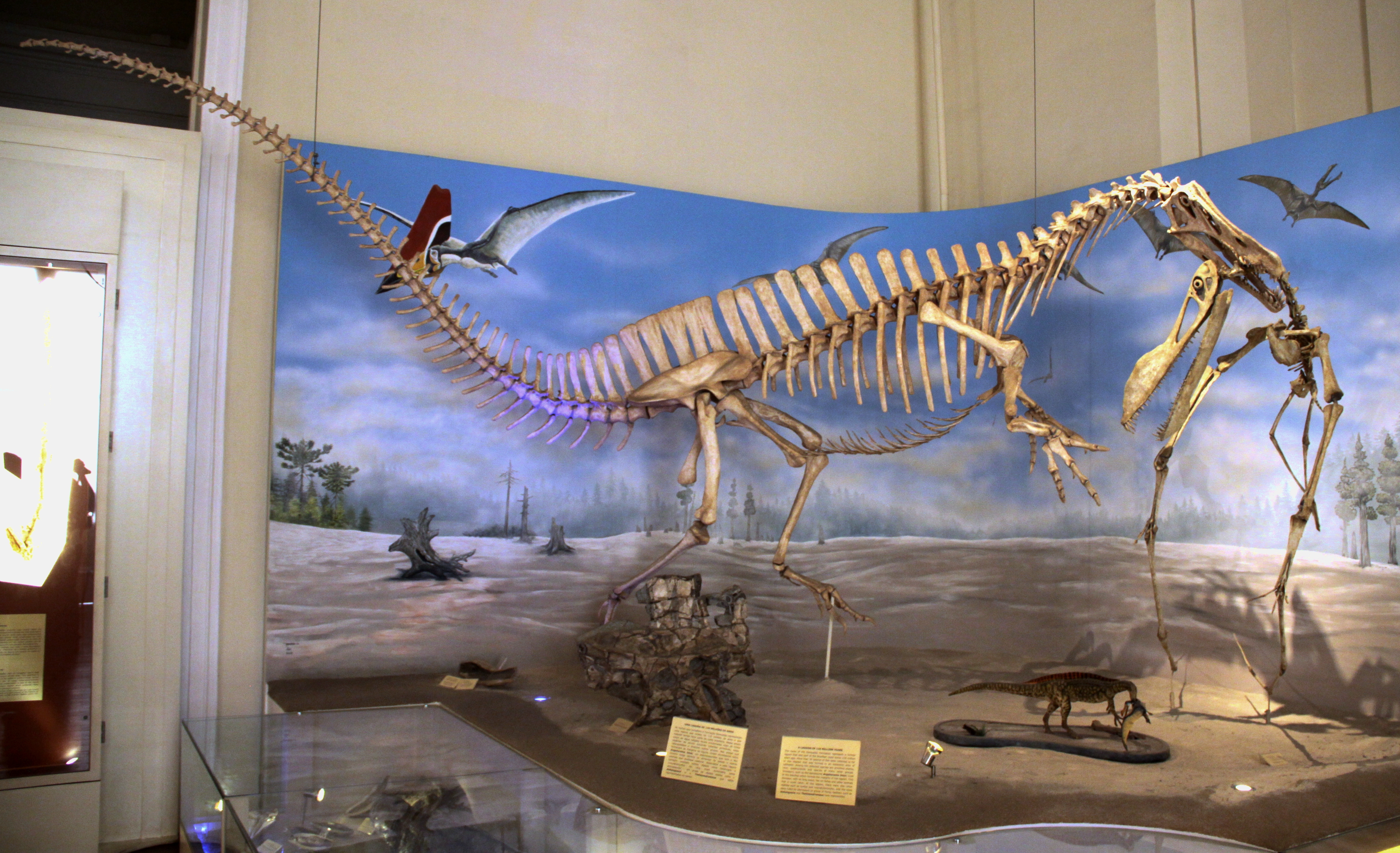
Skeleton mounted as attacking an anhanguerid pterosaur, National Museum of Rio de Janeiro

Another trait spinosaurs shared with gharials was an enlarged snout tip that wielded a rosette-shaped array of interlocking teeth, adept for impaling and catching fish. Although to a lesser degree than most known spinosaurs, this feature was also present in the Angaturama limai holotype. In 2002, Sues and colleagues pointed out, however, that there would be no reason to assume that the Spinosauridae specialized completely in fishing. They stressed rather that this head morphology indicates a generalistic feeding, particularly on small prey animals. In fact, portions of a young Iguanodon, a terrestrial herbivore, were found inside the fossil skeleton of one Baryonyx. Naish and colleagues in 2004 supported the theory that Irritator hunted both aquatic and terrestrial animals as a generalist within the coastal area and in addition probably searched for carrion. A tooth belonging to Irritator was discovered still inserted into the fossil neck vertebral column of an anhanguerid pterosaur, likely with a wingspan of 3.3 m (11 ft). This indicates that Irritator ate pterosaurs as well, although it is not known if it actively hunted these animals or simply scavenged the remains. In 2018, Aureliano and colleagues presented a possible scenario for the food web of the Romualdo Formation. The researchers proposed that spinosaurines from the formation may have also preyed on terrestrial and aquatic crocodyliforms, juveniles of their own species, turtles, and small to medium-sized dinosaurs. This would have made spinosaurines apex predators within this particular ecosystem.

Examinations and digital reconstructions of Irritator published in 2023 by Schade et al., suggests that the lower jaws of this spinosaurid could rotate and open laterally, with a gape similar to that of modern pelicans; this would have allowed the theropod to swallow very large prey items. It was also discovered to have a very weak but rapid bite as a result of this analysis. The study also reaffirms that Irritator likely possessed binocular vision and would have held its snout at an inclined orientation.

=== Aquatic habits ===
Many spinosaurs likely had semiaquatic habits, as has been shown in studies using techniques like isotope analysis and bone histology. It has been found that they probably took advantage of aquatic prey and environments (usually marginal and coastal habitats) to occupy a distinct ecological niche, therefore avoiding competition with more terrestrial theropods. Spinosaurines appear to have been more adapted for such lifestyles than baryonychines. A 2018 study by British paleontologist Thomas M. S. Arden and colleagues examined the morphology of spinosaurine skull bones for possible aquatic traits. They found that the frontal bones of Irritator, Spinosaurus, and Sigilmassasaurus were similar in being arched, concave on top, and narrowed at the front; features that would have resulted in the eyes being positioned further up on the head than in other theropods. In particular, the broad lower jaw and narrowed frontals of Irritator resulted in the orbits facing at a steep incline towards the midline of the skull, whereas most theropods had laterally facing orbits. These traits would have permitted the animal to see above the waterline when submerged.

In 2018, Aureliano and colleagues conducted an analysis on the Romualdo Formation tibia fragment. CT scanning of the specimen in the University of São Carlos revealed the presence of osteosclerosis (high bone density). This condition had previously only been observed in Spinosaurus aegyptiacus, as a possible way of facilitating submersion in water by making its bones heavier. The presence of this condition on the Brazilian leg fragment showed that compact bones had already evolved in spinosaurines at least 10 million years before the appearance of Spinosaurus in Morocco. According to phylogenetic bracketing—a method used to infer unknown traits in organisms by comparison with their relatives—osteosclerosis therefore might have been the norm in the Spinosaurinae. The significance of these traits was questioned in a later 2018 publication, where Canadian paleobiologist Donald Henderson argued that osteosclerosis would not have changed a theropod's buoyancy to a significant extent.

=== Neuroanatomy and senses ===
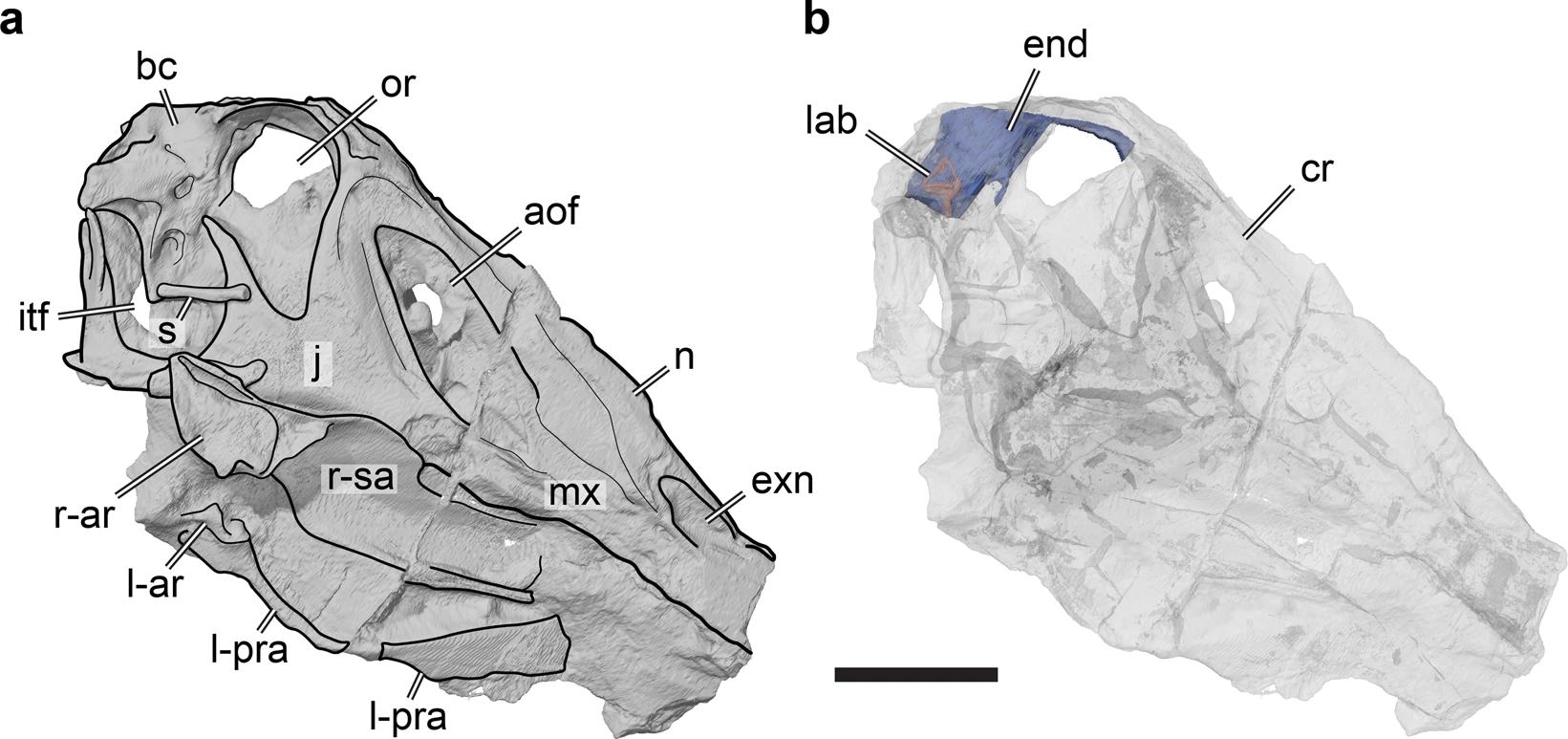
CT scan of the holotype showing endocast and endosseous labyrinth

In 2020, Schade and colleagues analyzed the anatomy of the holotype skull braincase through CT scans, revealing numerous details about behavioral capabilities of Irritator. With the scans, they created a 3D model of the skull and braincase, discovering that Irritator had elongated olfactory tracts and a relatively large floccular recesses (area that pierces through the semicircular canals and connects the brain with the inner ear). The flocculus, itself, is an important element in the coordination and control of head and ocular movements during gaze stabilization (visual ability during head movement), by being involved in the coordination of the vestibulo-ocular (VOR) and vestibulo-collic (VCR) reflexes. The flocculus appears to be enlarged in taxa that rely on quick movements of the head body. In addition, the vestibular part of the endosseous labyrinth has a large anterior semicircular canal with a lateral oriented semicircular canal.

Both floccular recesses and semicircular canal suggest that Irritator could coordinate fast head movements and had a downward inclined snout posture, enabling an unobstructed, stereoscopic forward vision, which is important for distance perception and therefore precise snatching movements of the snout. These inferences seem to be an agreement with a piscivore life-style. They also noted that the relatively well-developed cochlear duct may have enable an average hearing frequency of 1,950 Hz with a frequency band width of 3,196 Hz. However, they considered these ranges as rough estimates and established an overall frequency range of 350–3,550 Hz, making Irritator to be placed under bird hearing but above crocodiles.

In 2026, a paper by Andrea Cau and colleagues found osteological correlates in Irritator's skull that are consistent with the presence of salt glands, similar to those seen in many seabirds and shorebirds. This is consistent with the coastal environment of the Romualdo Formation, described by Lucas S. Antonietto and colleagues the same year as a 'paleo-mangrove forest', which would have brought Irritator into contact estuarine waters that had a relatively high saline concentration.

== Paleoenvironment and paleobiogeography ==
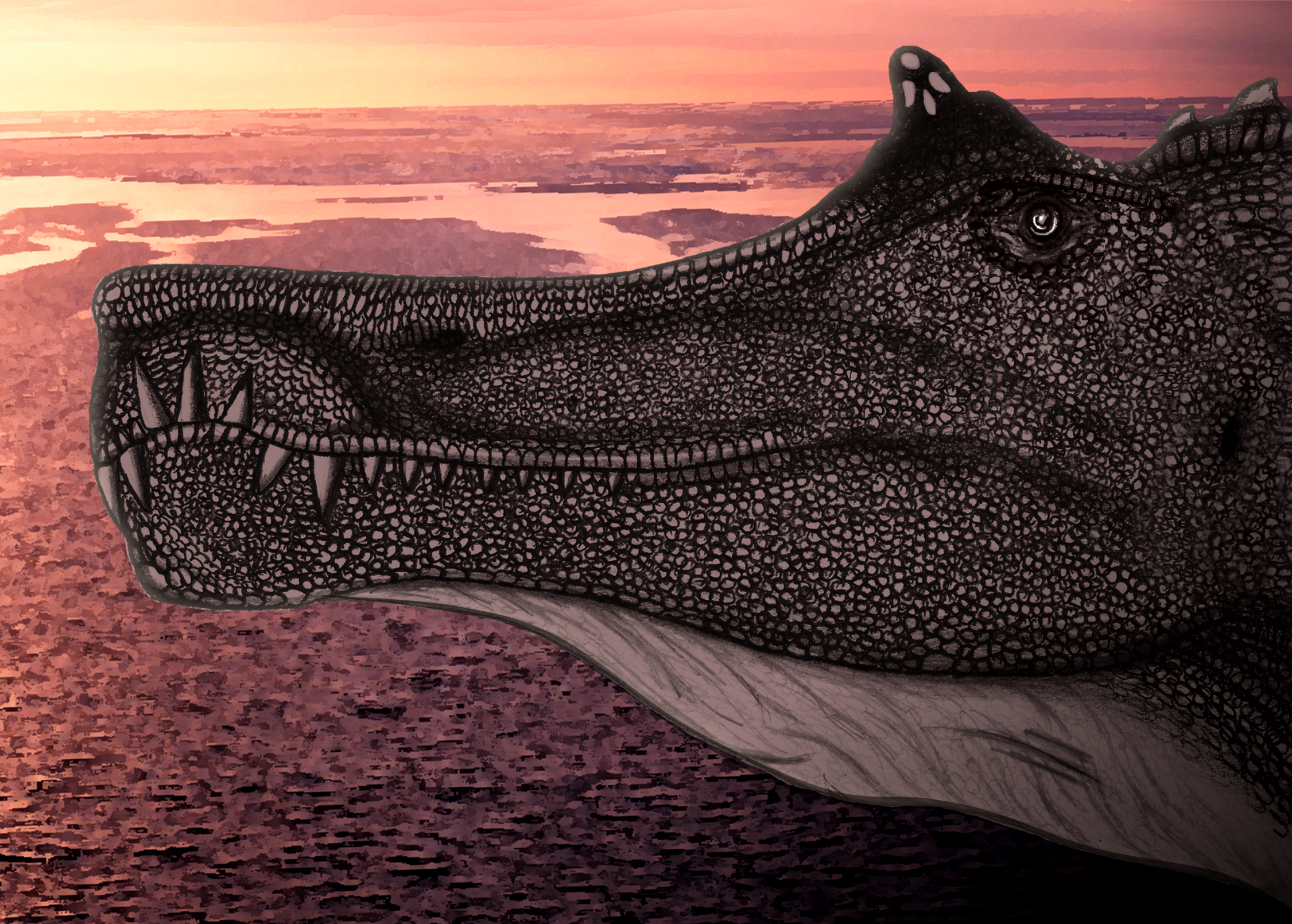
Restoration of the head

Irritator and Angaturama are known from the Romualdo Formation, whose rocks are dated to the Albian stage of the Early Cretaceous Period, about 110 million years ago. During this time, the Southern Atlantic Ocean was opening, forming the series of circum-Atlantic basins of southern Brazil and southwestern Africa, but the northeastern part of Brazil and West Africa were still connected. The Romualdo Formation is part of the Santana Group and, at the time Irritator was described, was thought to be a member of what was then considered the Santana Formation. The Romualdo Formation is a Lagerstätte (a sedimentary deposit that preserves fossils in excellent condition) consisting of limestone concretions embedded in shales, and overlies the Crato Formation. It is well known for preserving fossils three-dimensionally in limestone concretions, including many pterosaur fossils. In addition to muscle fibres of pterosaurs and dinosaurs, fish, preserving gills, digestive tracts, and hearts, have been found there. The formation is interpreted as a coastal lagoon with irregular freshwater influence that contended with cycles of transgressing and regressing sea levels. The climate of the formation was tropical and largely corresponded to today's Brazilian climate. The regions surrounding the formation were arid to semi-arid, with most of the local flora being xerophytic (adapted to dry environments). Cycadales and the extinct conifer Brachyphyllum were the most widespread plants.

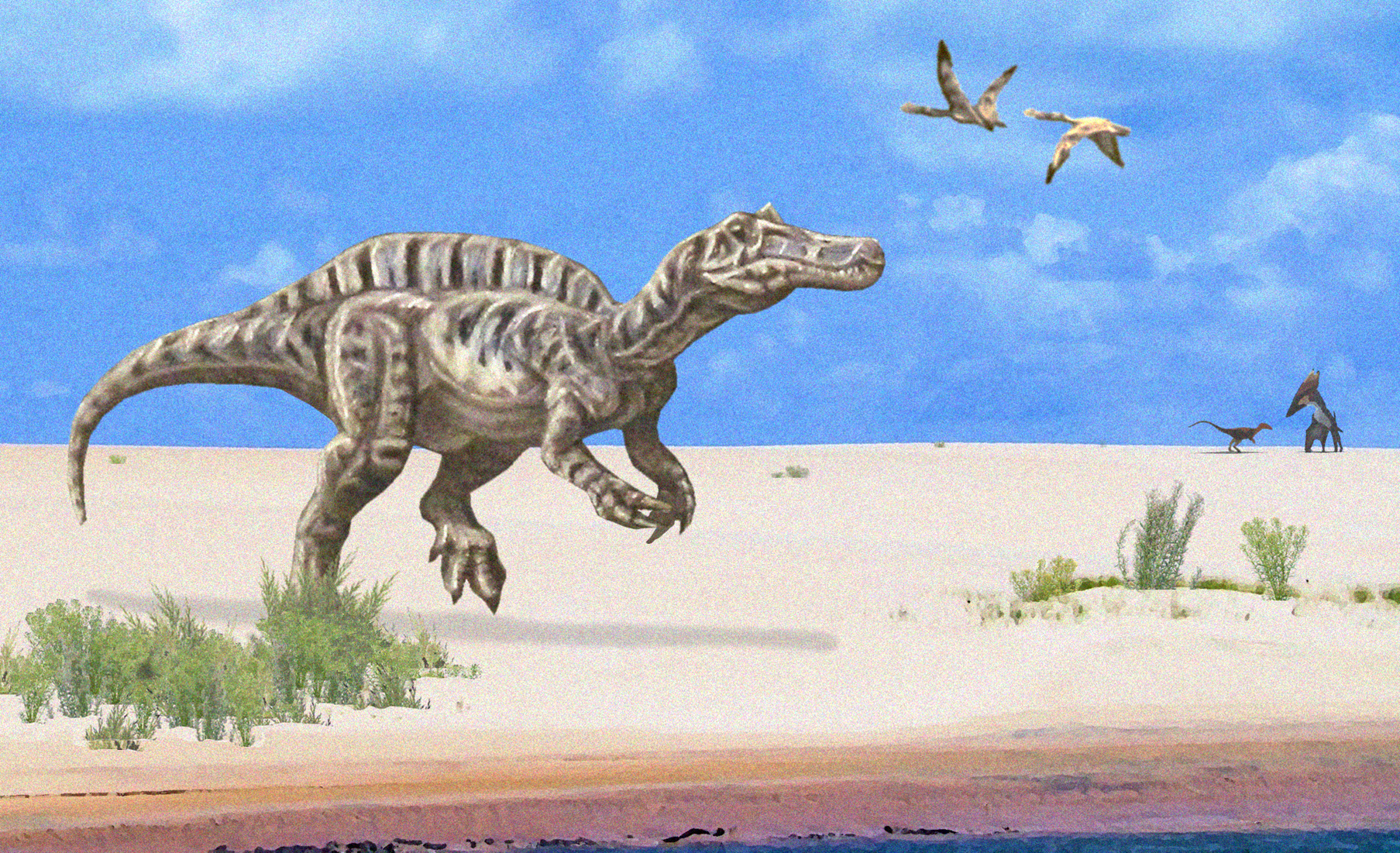
Restoration of Irritator walking down a coastline in the Romualdo Formation environment

This environment was dominated by pterosaurs, including: Anhanguera, Araripedactylus, Araripesaurus, Brasileodactylus, Cearadactylus, Coloborhynchus, Santanadactylus, Tapejara, Thalassodromeus, Tupuxuara, Barbosania, Maaradactylus, Tropeognathus, and Unwindia. The known dinosaur fauna besides Irritator was represented by other theropods like the tyrannosauroid Santanaraptor, the compsognathid Mirischia, an indeterminate unenlagiine dromaeosaurid, and a megaraptoran. The crocodyliforms Araripesuchus and Caririsuchus, as well as the turtles Brasilemys, Cearachelys, Araripemys, Euraxemys, and Santanachelys, are known from the deposits. There were also clam shrimps, sea urchins, ostracods, and molluscs. Various well-preserved fish fossils record the presence of: hybodont sharks, guitarfish, gars, amiids, ophiopsids, oshuniids, pycnodontids, aspidorhynchids, cladocyclids, bonefishes, chanids, mawsoniids and some uncertain forms. According to Naish and colleagues, the lack of herbivorous dinosaurs could mean that the local vegetation was scant and thus incapable of sustaining a large population of them. The abundant carnivorous theropods would have then likely turned to the lush aquatic life as a primary food source. They also hypothesized that following storm events, pterosaur and fish carcasses might have washed up on the shoreline, providing theropods with plenty of carrion. Multiple piscivorous animals were present in the formation, which might in theory have led to high competition. Aureliano and colleagues stated there must have, therefore, been some degree of niche partitioning, where different animals would have fed on prey of varied sizes and locations within the lagoon.

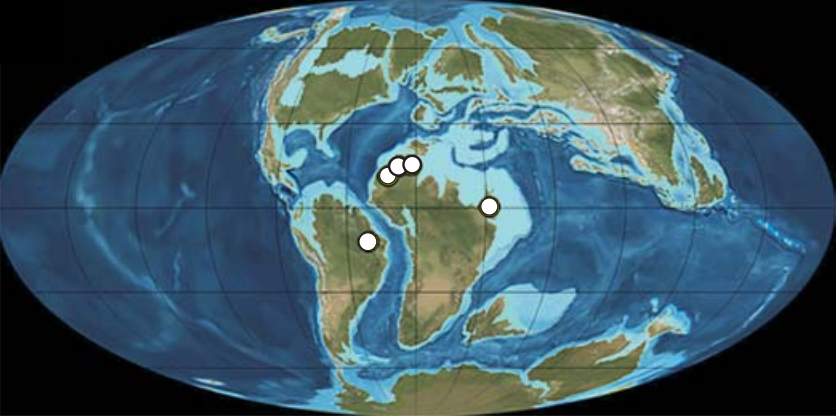
Generalized locations of spinosaurid fossil discoveries from the Albian-Cenomanian, 113 to 93.9 million years ago, marked on a map of that time span

Similarities between the fauna of the Romualdo and Crato Formations to that of Middle Cretaceous Africa suggest that the Araripe Basin was connected to the Tethys Sea, though this link was likely sporadic, because the lack of marine invertebrates indicates the basin had a non-marine depositional setting. Spinosaurids had already achieved a cosmopolitan distribution during the Early Cretaceous. Paul Sereno and colleagues in 1998 suggested that with the opening of the Tethys Sea, spinosaurines would have evolved in the south (Africa, in Gondwana) and baryonychines in the north (Europe, in Laurasia). In following, Machado and Kellner theorized in 2005 that spinosaurines would have then spread to South America from Africa. Sereno and colleagues postulated that divergent evolution between spinosaurines in South America and Africa likely occurred as a consequence of the Atlantic Ocean, whose opening gradually separated the continents and contributed to differences between taxa. A similar scenario was suggested in 2014 by Brazilian paleontologist Manuel A. Medeiros and colleagues for the fauna of the Alcântara Formation, where Oxalaia has been found. But the paleobiogeography of spinosaurids remains highly theoretical and uncertain, with discoveries in Asia and Australia indicating that it may have been complex.

=== Taphonomy ===
The taphonomy (changes between death and fossilization) of the Irritator challengeri holotype specimen has been discussed by some researchers. The skull was found lying on its side. Preceding fossilization, several bones from the back of the braincase, as well as the dentary, splenial, coronoid, and right angular bones from the lower jaw, were lost. Other bones, mostly from the skull rear, had become disarticulated and displaced towards alternate regions of the head before burial. Naish and colleagues in 2004 asserted that the Romualdo Formation dinosaur fauna is represented by animals that died near shorelines or rivers before being carried out to sea, where their floating remains were eventually fossilized. In 2018, Aureliano and colleagues argued against this scenario, stating that the Irritator challengeri holotype's mandible was preserved in articulation with the rest of the skull, whereas it would have likely detached had the carcass been floating at sea. They also noted that the corpse would have quickly sunk due to the osteosclerosis of the skeleton. The researchers, therefore, concluded that fossils from the Santana Group represent organisms that were buried in their natural habitat, instead of having been deposited allochthonously (other than at their present position).

== Controversies and restitution dispute ==
Following the publication of the reappraisal study in May 2023, the fact that the Brazilian holotype specimen was kept in a German collection attracted criticism. The authors had included an "Ethics Statement" which acknowledged recent debates surrounding the ethical and legal concerns regarding research on Brazilian fossils. According to the authors, however, the fossils had been exported from Brazil before legislation requiring permits for the export of specimens entered into force. Accordingly, they claimed the holotype specimen to be the property of the German Bundesland of Baden-Württemberg, with a clarification of its legal status lying neither within the authors' power nor within that of the local curator.

Brazilian paleontologists and legal specialists disputed this claim and called for the return of the fossil to Brazil, inter alia in an open letter to Petra Olschowski, State Minister of Science and Art of Baden-Württemberg; two authors of the criticised study were among the signatories. A legal analysis of potential restitution of the holotype of Irritator challengeri concluded that the Brazilian state is the legal owner of the fossil and that the State Museum of Natural History most likely did not acquire good title to it in good faith. A civil action of restitution under Article 985 of the German Civil Code is, however, precluded due to a statute of limitations of 30 years.

In April 2025, the Brazilian think tank Rede Patrimônio em Pauta (Heritage in Focus Network) published an online petition demanding the return of the Irritator to its region of origin and has gathered over 34,600 signatures. In April 2026, the Ministry of Foreign Affairs of Brazil and the German Press Office shared the Joint Declaration signed during the 3rd German-Brazilian Intergovernmental Consultations, which stated that "both governments welcome the willingness of the State of Baden-Württemberg and the State Museum of Natural History in Stuttgart to hand over the Irritator challengeri fossil to Brazil". No timeframe has been announced for the return; according to Lars Krogmann (director of the State Museum of Natural History Stuttgart), this was to be determined in coordination with the competent Brazilian authorities during the following months.

The decision was received favourably by Brazilian and international experts. However, the wording of the Joint Declaration announcing the return of the fossil and inconsistencies across versions attracted some criticism. The English version states that the holotype will be "hand[ed] over," whereas the Portuguese version uses the expression "retornar" (English: (to) return); the German version, finally, announces a transfer ("übergegen") in the context of scientific cooperation ("im Kontext wissenschaftlicher Zusammenarbeit"). This has been criticised as a missed opportunity to acknowledge the illicit provenance of the fossil, and as an attempt to distort the meaning of what, factually, is a return and suppress its legal, ethical, and decolonial implications along a North-South relationship of power.
