= Hutubihe Formation =

Geologic formation in Xinjiang, China

Hutuhibe Formation
- Stratigraphic range: Early Cretaceous, Valanginian
- Type: Geological formation
- Unit of: Tugulu Group
- Underlies: Shengjinkou Formation
- Overlies: Qingshuihe Formation

Lithology
- Primary: Mudstone, sandstone, breccia

Location
- Region: Xinjiang Uygur Autonomous Region
- Country: China
- Extent: Junggar Basin

The Hutuhbihe Formation, also known as the Hutubei Formation, is an Early Cretaceous fossil formation that is part of the larger Tugulu Group in Xinjiang, China. Pollen and clam shrimp assemblages present in the formation indicate a Valanginian age. Body fossils of dinosaurs, pterosaurs, crocodylomorphs, and plesiosaurs have been recovered from the formation, alongside hundreds of fossil trackways.

== Paleofauna ==
The following faunal list follows Zheng et al. (2024) unless otherwise noted:

- Dinosauria indet.
- Dsungaripteridae indet.
- Crocodylomorpha indet.
- Plesiosauria indet.
- Wuguia efremovi
- Wuguia hutubeiensis

=== Ichnofossils ===
- Aquatilavipes isp.
- Goseongornipes isp.
- Koreanaornis dodsoni
- Moguiornipes robusta
- Asianopodus isp.
- Deltapodus curriei isp.
- cf. Jialingpus isp.
- Pteraichnus wuerhoensis (may have been left by Noripterus complicidens)
- Chelonipus isp.
- Emydhipus isp.
