= Tugulu Group =

Geological Group in Xinjiang, China

- Stratigraphic range: Early Cretaceous
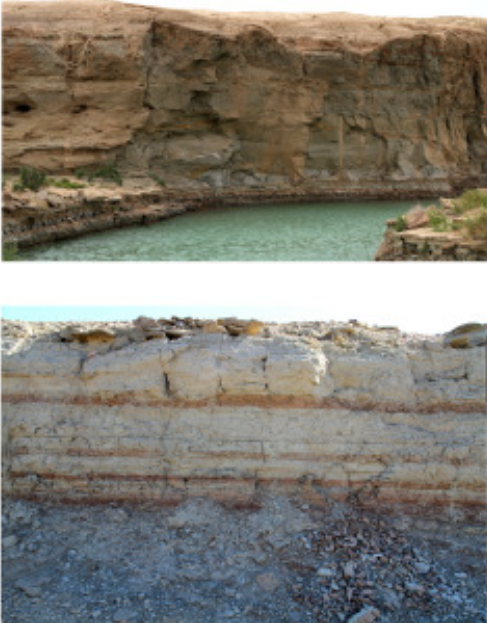
- The Shengjinkou Formation, which makes up part of the Tugulu Group. Photographed before 2021.
- Type: Group
- Sub-units: Qingshuihe, Hutubihe, Shengjinkou & Lianmuqin Formations
- Underlies: Donggou & Kumutake Formations
- Overlies: Kalaza Formation
- Thickness: 150–1,640 m (490–5,380 ft)

Location
- Region: Xinjiang
- Country: China
- Extent: Junggar Basin

The Tugulu Group (simplified Chinese: 吐谷鲁群; traditional Chinese: 吐谷魯群; pinyin: Tǔgǔlǔ Qún) is a geological Group in Xinjiang, China whose strata date back to the Early Cretaceous. Dinosaur skeletal remains and footprints are among the fossils that have been recovered from the formation.

== Vertebrate paleofauna ==
=== Dinosaurs ===
Color key: Taxon / Reclassified taxon / Taxon falsely reported as present / Dubious taxon or junior synonym / Ichnotaxon / Ootaxon / Morphotaxon	Notes; Uncertain or tentative taxa are in small text; ~~crossed out~~ taxa are discredited.

Dinosaurs
Genus	Species	Location	Stratigraphic position	Material	Notes	Images
Asiatosaurus	A. mongoliensis					Kelmayisaurus Wuerhosaurus Xiyunykus
Deltapodus	D. curriei					Kelmayisaurus Wuerhosaurus Xiyunykus
Kelmayisaurus	K. petrolicus			Maxilla and dentary		Kelmayisaurus Wuerhosaurus Xiyunykus
Xinjiangovenator	X. parvus			Tibia and phalanges	Formerly thought to be a representative of Phaedrolosaurus ilikensis.	Kelmayisaurus Wuerhosaurus Xiyunykus
Phaedrolosaurus	P. ilikensis			A tooth		Kelmayisaurus Wuerhosaurus Xiyunykus
Psittacosaurus	P. xinjiangensis			Several specimens of different ages and sizes, holotype and most complete specimen belonging to a juvenile	An early ceratopsian	Kelmayisaurus Wuerhosaurus Xiyunykus
Tugulusaurus	T. faciles			Hindlimb, rib, and a vertebral centrum		Kelmayisaurus Wuerhosaurus Xiyunykus
Xiyunykus	X. pengi			Partial skeleton		Kelmayisaurus Wuerhosaurus Xiyunykus
Wuerhosaurus	W. homheni			Partial skeleton	A stegosaur	Kelmayisaurus Wuerhosaurus Xiyunykus
Ornithomimosauria indet.	Indeterminate			Hand claw and associated caudal vertebrae	The first ornithomimosaur known from the Junggar Basin	Kelmayisaurus Wuerhosaurus Xiyunykus

=== Pterosaurs ===
Pterosaurs
Genus	Species	Location	Stratigraphic position	Abundance	Notes	Images
Dsungaripterus	D. weii				A dsungaripterid	Dsungaripterus(top) and Noripterus (bottom)
Noripterus	N. complicidens			Front part of the skull and lower jaws, vertebrae, and partial limbs and pelvis.	A dsungaripterid	Dsungaripterus(top) and Noripterus (bottom)
Lonchognathosaurus	L. acutirostris			Front portion of skull and lower jaws	Possible junior synonym of Dsungaripterus weii.	
Ornithocheiromorpha indet.	Indeterminate			Partial humerus	The first known ornithocheiromorph from the Tugulu Group	

=== Pseudosuchians ===
Name	Species	Location	Stratigraphic position	Material	Notes	Images
Edentosuchus	E. tienshanensis				A crocodyliform	

=== Turtles ===
Name	Species	Location	Stratigraphic position	Material	Notes	Images
Dracochelys	Dracochelys bicuspis			A skull, an incomplete skeleton.	A sinemydid	
Ordosemys	O. brinkmania			An isolated skull, several shells.	A sinemydid	
Xinjiangchelys	Indeterminate			A shell preserved on a slab in ventral view	A xinjiangchelyid	
Wuguia	W. efremovi W. hutubeiensis			Partial shells (W. efremovi), an incomplete skeleton (W. hutubeiensis)	A sinemydid	
Pantrionychia indet.				A poorly preserved skull in dorsal view	A cryptodiran	

=== Fish ===
Name	Species	Location	Stratigraphic position	Abundance	Notes	Images
Bogdaichthys	B. fukangensis				A siyuichthyid	
Bogdaichthys	B. serratus				A siyuichthyid	
Dsungarichthys	D. bilineatus				A siyuichthyid	
Manasichthys	M. elongatus				A siyuichthyid	
Manasichthys	M. tuguluensis				A siyuichthyid	
Neobaleiichthys	N. chikuensis					
Siyuichthys	S. ornatus				A siyuichthyid	
Siyuichthys	S. pulchellus				A siyuichthyid	
Siyuichthys	S. pulcher				A siyuichthyid	
Uighuroniscus	U. sinkiangensis					
Wukangia	W. houyanshanensis				A siyuichthyid	
