= Phobetor (disambiguation) =

Phobetor was a god who appeared in dreams in the form of beasts in Ovid's Metamorphoses.

Phobetor may also refer to:

- Phobetor, a synonym of the marine fish genus Gymnocanthus
- Phobetor, a genus of pterosaur now classified as Noripterus
- Phobetor (planet) or PSR 1257+12 d, an exoplanet
