= Lonchognathosaurus =

Lonchognathosaurus Temporal range: Early Cretaceous Barremian–Albian

Scientific classification
- Kingdom: Animalia
- Phylum: Chordata
- Class: Reptilia
- Order: †Pterosauria
- Suborder: †Pterodactyloidea
- Family: †Dsungaripteridae
- Genus: †Lonchognathosaurus; Maisch, Matzke, and Sun, 2004
- Species: †L. acutirostris

Binomial name
- †Lonchognathosaurus acutirostris Maisch, Matzke, and Sun, 2004

Genus of dsungaripterid pterosaur from the Early Cretaceous

Lonchognathosaurus is a genus of dsungaripterid pterodactyloid pterosaur from the Aptian-Albian-age Lower Cretaceous Lianmuqin Formation of Xinjiang, China.

== Discovery and naming ==
The genus was named in 2004 by Michael Maisch, Andreas Matzke and Sun Ge. The type species is Lonchognathosaurus acutirostris. The genus name is derived from Greek lonchos, "lance", gnathos, "jaw" and sauros, "lizard", in reference to the fact that it is a reptile with pointed jaws. The specific name means "needle snout" in Latin.

The holotype specimen of Lonchognathosaurus, SGP 2001/19, was found near Urumqi in the southern Junggar Basin, the front portion of a skull and lower jaws that came from a large individual; the estimated length of the complete skull was about 400 mm (15.75 in). The point of the upper jaw, composed of the premaxilla bones, was slender and had a needle-like tip. The teeth of the upper jaw appeared far back of the tip, and were well-spaced, diminishing in size from front to back; they ended again in front of the nostrils. They were placed in tooth-sockets that had a low bony ridge but were not otherwise elevated from the jaw. Each maxilla only had eight teeth, and the bottom margin of the upper jaw was straight (unlike in other pterosaurs where it is strongly curved). A sagittal crest was present, with grooves and a concave leading margin.

Averianov et al., (2022) described a distal fragment of the wing metacarpal from the Lower Cretaceous Barremian-Aptian age Ilek Formation in West Siberia, Russia and identified it as cf. Lonchognathosaurus sp., since it is "nearly identical to the wing metacarpal of Lonchognathosaurus acutirostris."

== Classification ==
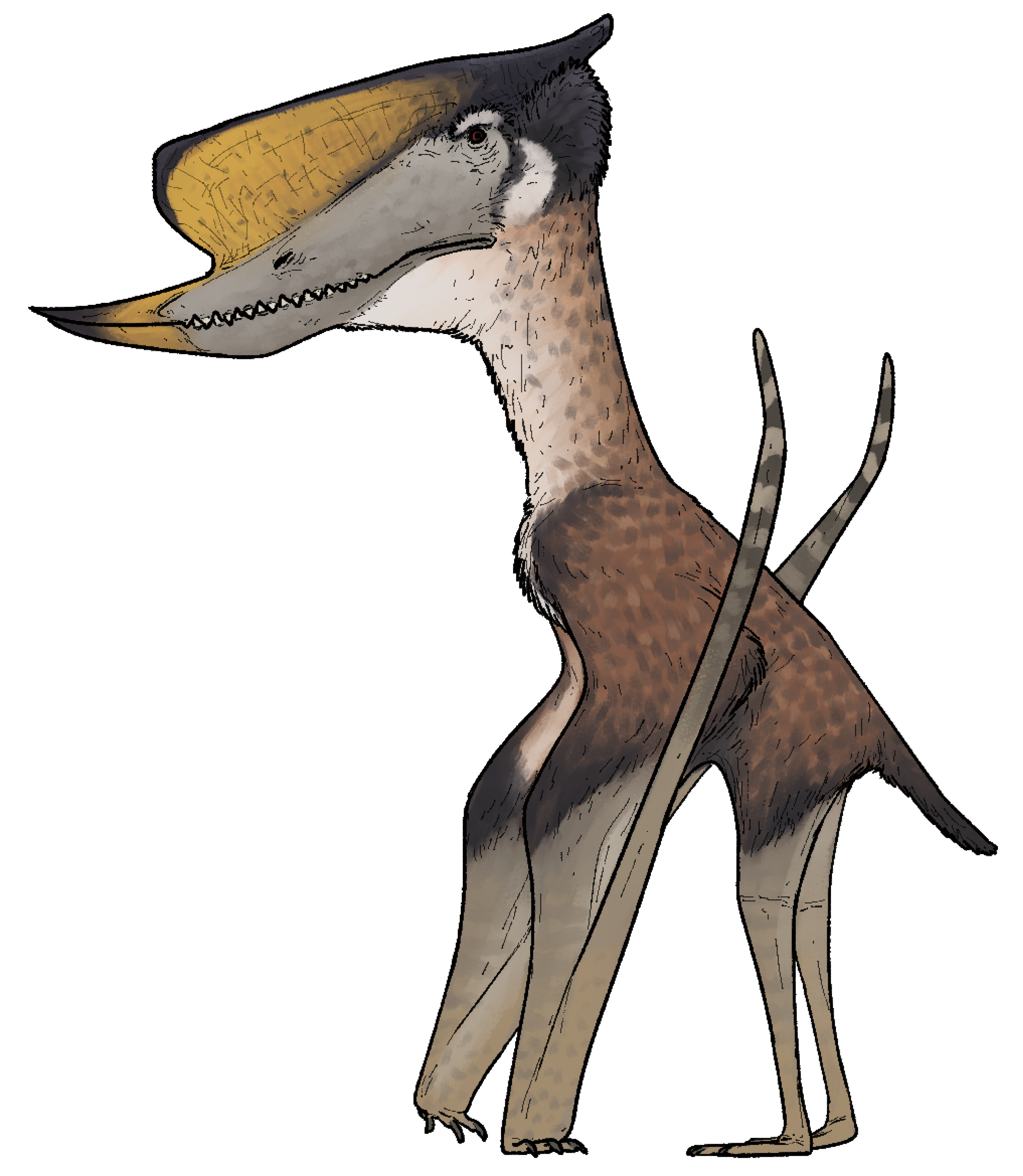
Life restoration of fellow dsungaripterid Dsungaripterus weii

The genus was, after a cladistic analysis, classified as a member of the Dsungaripteridae, as the sister taxon to Dsungaripterus.

According to Brian Andres Lonchognathosaurus is a junior synonym of Dsungaripterus weii. David Hone on the other hand, argued in 2017 that the species could not be distinguished from Noripterus. However, in 2021, postcranial elements referrable to Lonchognathosaurus, confirming the validity of the genus and providing new information on the anatomy of this pterosaur, were described from the Lower Cretaceous Lianmuqin Formation (China) by Augustin et al..

== See also ==
- List of pterosaur genera
- Timeline of pterosaur research
