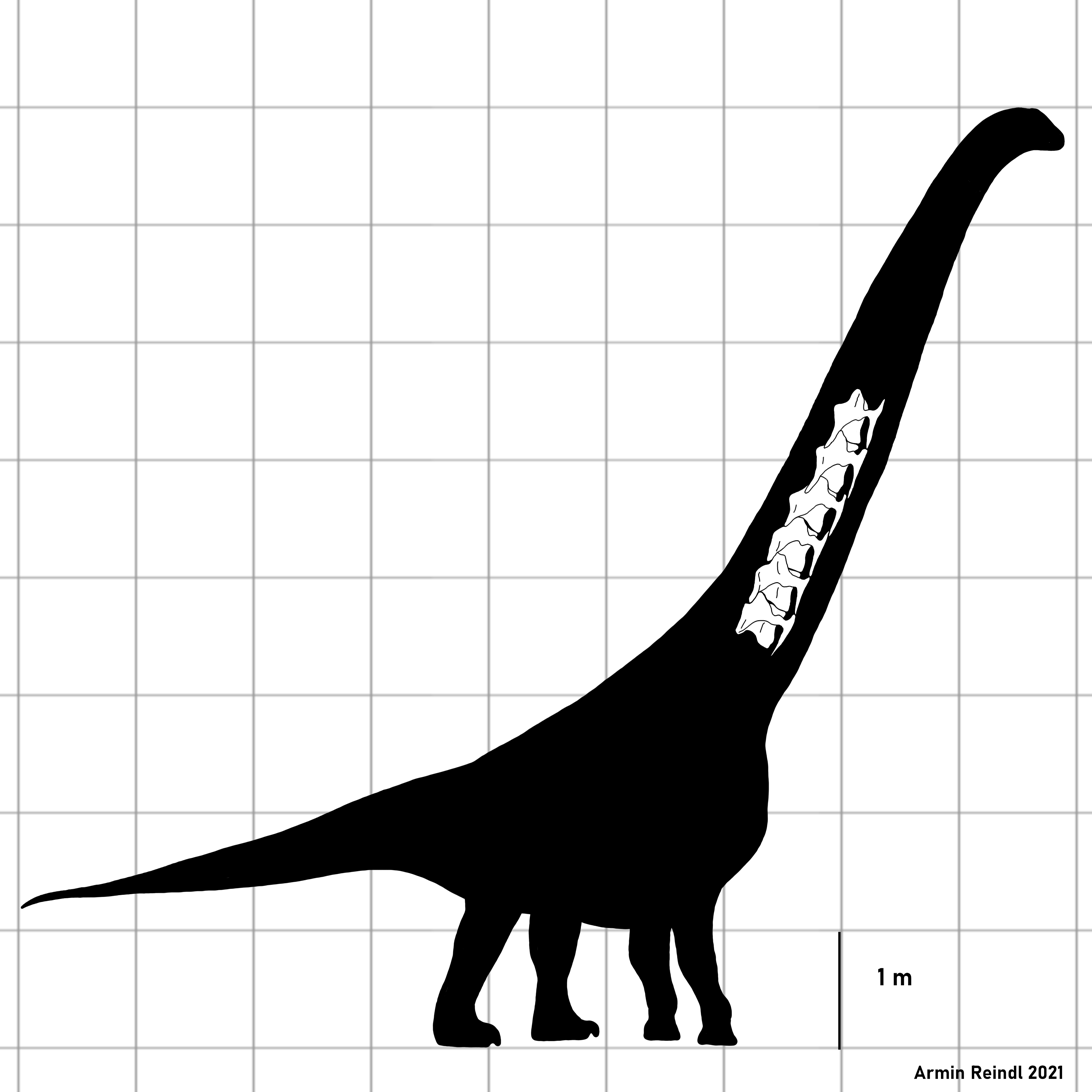
- Skeletal diagram showing known material

Scientific classification
- Kingdom: Animalia
- Phylum: Chordata
- Class: Reptilia
- Clade: Dinosauria
- Clade: Saurischia
- Clade: †Sauropodomorpha
- Clade: †Sauropoda
- Clade: †Macronaria
- Family: †Euhelopodidae
- Genus: †Silutitan; Wang et al., 2021

Type species
- †Silutitan sinensis Wang et al., 2021

= Silutitan =

Silutitan Temporal range: Early Cretaceous, ?Valanginian

Genus of euhelopodid sauropod dinosaur

Silutitan (meaning "Silk Road giant") is a genus of euhelopodid sauropod dinosaur from the Early Cretaceous Shengjinkou Formation of Xinjiang, China. It contains only the type species, Silutitan sinensis.

== Discovery and naming ==
In 2006, a Konservat-Lagerstätte was reported from the Shengjinkou Formation in the Hami region of Xinjiang, China. This consisted of lake sediments allowing for exceptional preservation of fossils. The same year, Qiu Zhanxiang and Wang Banyue started official excavations.

Among the excavated fossils were six cervical vertebrae with all neural spines intact. In 2021, these were established as the holotype (IVPP V27874) of the new sauropod taxon, Silutitan. A Hamipterus jaw was found near the tenth cervical vertebra, but this is likely due to taphonomy. The generic name, refers to the Silk Road (Silu in Mandarin), while the specific name, sinensis, refers to China.

== Classification ==
The phylogenetic analysis of Wang et al. places Silutitan as the sister taxon to Euhelopus, a position that does not change when it is combined with the contemporary titanosaur Hamititan into a single unit.

- Euhelopodidae
  - - Phuwiangosaurus
    - Tangvayosaurus
  - - Qiaowanlong
    - - - Huanghetitan ruyangensis
        - Ruyangosaurus
        - Yongjinglong
      - - - Erketu
          - Gobititan
        - - Euhelopus
          - Silutitan

== Paleobiology ==
Other animals from the holotype locality include the contemporary titanosaur Hamititan, which was described in the same paper, and the pterosaur Hamipterus. Together, Silutitan, the aforementioned fauna, and an unnamed theropod represent the known fossil vertebrate taxa of the area.
