= Siyuichthyidae =

Siyuichthyidae Temporal range: Early Cretaceous

Scientific classification
- Domain: Eukaryota
- Kingdom: Animalia
- Phylum: Chordata
- Class: Actinopterygii
- Division: Teleostei
- Family: †Siyuichthyidae; Su, 1985

Extinct family of ray-finned fishes

Siyuichthyidae is an extinct family of stem-teleost fish known from the Early Cretaceous Tugulu Group of Xinjiang, China. It contains five genera with a total of nine species, all of which are based on poor remains.

== Classification ==
- Bogdaichthys Su, 1985
  - B. fukangensis
  - B. serratus
- Dsungarichthys Su, 1985
  - D. bilineatus
- Manasichthys Su, 1985
  - M. elongatus
  - M. tuguluensis
- Siyuichthys Su, 1985
  - S. ornatus
  - S. pulchellus
  - S. pulcher
- Wukangia Su, 1985
  - W. houyanshanensis
