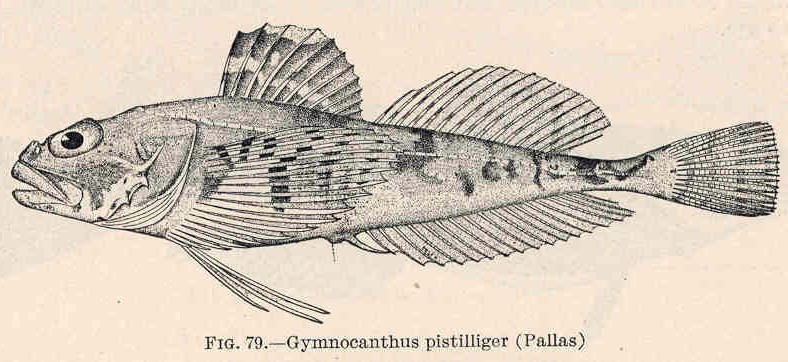

Scientific classification
- Kingdom: Animalia
- Phylum: Chordata
- Class: Actinopterygii
- Order: Perciformes
- Suborder: Cottoidei
- Family: Psychrolutidae
- Genus: Gymnocanthus
- Species: G. pistilliger

Binomial name
- Gymnocanthus pistilliger Pallas, 1814

Synonyms
- Cottus pistilliger Pallas, 1814; Cottus ventralis Cuvier, 1829; Gymnocanthus ventralis (Cuvier, 1829)

= Gymnocanthus pistilliger =

Species of fish

Gymnocanthus pistilliger, the threaded sculpin, is a species of marine ray-finned fish belonging to the family Cottidae, the typical sculpins. This species occurs in the northern Pacific Ocean.

== Taxonomy ==
Gymnocanthus pistilliger was first formally described as Cottus pistilliger in 1815 by the German zoologist Peter Simon Pallas with the type locality given as Unalaska Island and Port Avatsch. In 1829 the French zoologist Georges Cuvier described a new species, Cottus ventralis, from Kamchatka and in 1839 the English zoologist William Swainson classified this taxon within the monospecific genus Gymnocanthus. Cuvier's C. ventralis has since been regarded as a synonym of Pallas's C. pistilliger. The specific name pistilliger means "to bear pistils", a reference to the axillary papillae of the males.

== Description ==
Gymnocanthus pistilliger has dorsal fins supported by between 9 and 11 spines and between 13 and 16 soft rays while the anal fin has 14 to 18 soft rays. There are a small number of bony plates typically found along the median line of the space between the eyes. There is no cirrhus above the eye in adults. There are three pairs of bony tubercles on the back of the head. The cleithrum does not have a well developed spines. The males have flattened cirri on the axil of the pectoral fin. The maximum published total length is 28 cm (11 in), although 19.5 cm (7.7 in) is more typical.

== Distribution and habitat ==
Gymnocanthus pistilliger is found in the north Pacific Ocean from the Sea of Japan, the Sea of Okhotsk to the Chukchi Peninsula in Asia and from Norton Sound, Alaska to Kiska Island in the Aleutian and southeastern Alaska in North America. They are typically found in waters shallower than 50 m (160 ft) over soft substrates of sand or mud. However, they have been recorded as deps as 325 m (1,066 ft).

== Biology ==
Gymnocanthus pistilliger is thought to be a short-lived species for which otoliths give age estimates of up to 10 years for males and 9 years for females. Females collected in June had resting stage ovaries which contained some residual eggs from a previous batch of spawning. The diet of this species changes from largely gammarids and polychaetes in smaller fish to crangonid shrimp and fishes in larger specimens. In the Russian part of the Sea of Japan there is a spring migration of this species from the outer edge of the continental shelf towards the warmer miggle and upper parts of the shelfs where it gathers in feeding aggregations in the summer and in the autumn they gather in shoals before spawning.
