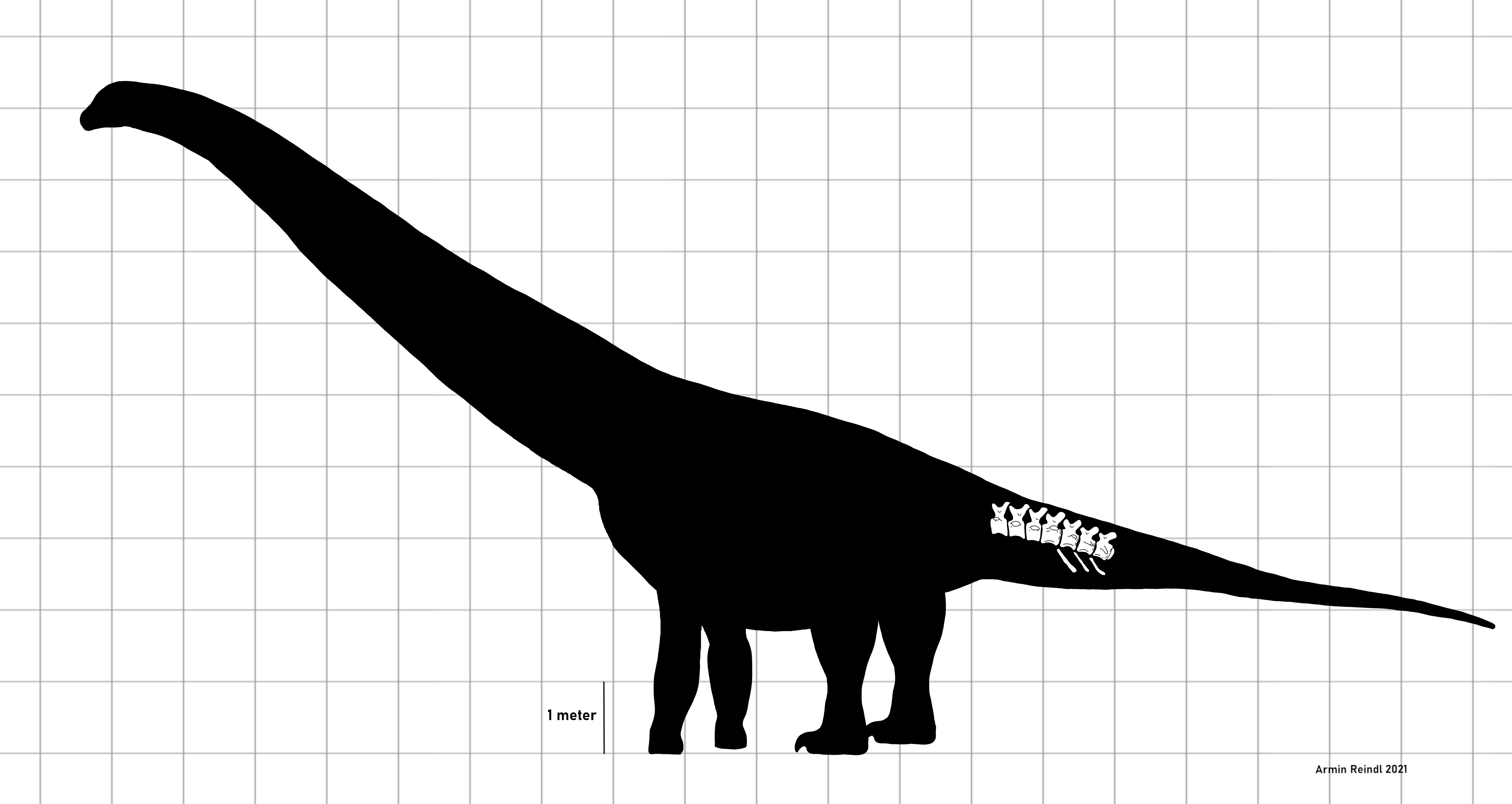
- Skeletal diagram showing known material

Scientific classification
- Domain: Eukaryota
- Kingdom: Animalia
- Phylum: Chordata
- Clade: Dinosauria
- Clade: Saurischia
- Clade: †Sauropodomorpha
- Clade: †Sauropoda
- Clade: †Macronaria
- Clade: †Titanosauria
- Genus: †Hamititan; Wang et al., 2021

Type species
- †Hamititan xinjiangensis Wang et al., 2021

= Hamititan =

Hamititan Temporal range: Early Cretaceous, ?Valanginian

Genus of titanosaur

Hamititan (meaning "Hami giant") is a genus of titanosaur sauropod dinosaur from the Shengjinkou Formation of Xinjiang, China. It contains one species, the type species, Hamititan xinjiangensis.

== Discovery and naming ==
In 2006, a Konservat-Lagerstätte was reported from the Shengjinkou Formation in the Hami region of Xinjiang, China. This consisted of lake sediments allowing for exceptional preservation of fossils. The same year, Qiu Zhanxiang and Wang Banyue started official excavations.

Among the excavated fossils were seven caudal vertebrae with three chevrons preserved. These were established as the holotype (HM V22) of the new sauropod taxon, Hamititan. Four sacral elements, specimen IVPP V27875, were not referred. A theropod tooth was found near the sixth caudal vertebra of the holotype. It is likely that this theropod preyed on the holotype shortly after it died. The generic name refers to the city of Hami, where the holotype was found, while the specific name, xinjiangensis, refers to the Chinese province, Xinjiang.

== Classification ==
The phylogenetic analysis of Wang et al. places Hamititan as a derived non-lithostrotian titanosaur in a polytomy with Epachthosaurus, Kaijutitan, Notocolossus, rinconsaurs, lognkosaurs, and lithostrotians. If it is scored with the contemporary Silutitan as a single taxon, the combined taxon will be sister to Euhelopus. A cladogram depicting the former hypothesis is shown below:

- Titanosauria
  - - Andesaurus
    - Wintonotitan
  - - Malarguesaurus
    - - Epachthosaurus
      - Hamititan
      - Kaijutitan
      - Notocolossus
      - Rinconsauria
      - Lognkosauria
      - - Dreadnoughtus
        - Lithostrotia

== Paleobiology ==
Other animals from the holotype locality include the pterosaur Hamipterus and contemporary euhelopodid Silutitan, which is described in the same paper. Together, Hamititan, the aforementioned fauna and an unnamed theropod represent the known vertebrate taxa of the area.
