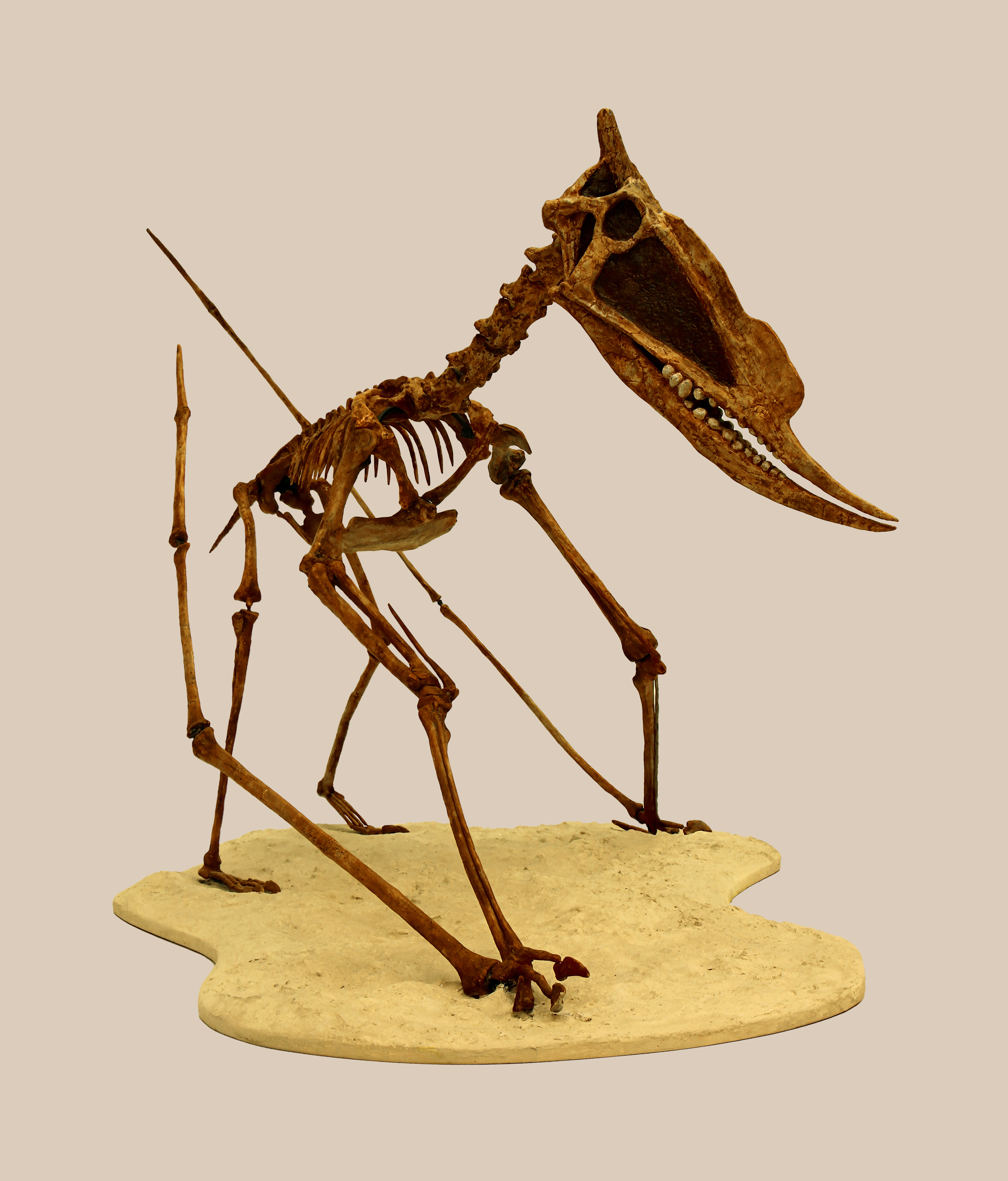
- Reconstructed skeleton

Scientific classification
- Kingdom: Animalia
- Phylum: Chordata
- Class: Reptilia
- Order: †Pterosauria
- Suborder: †Pterodactyloidea
- Family: †Dsungaripteridae
- Subfamily: †Dsungaripterinae
- Genus: †Dsungaripterus; Young, 1964
- Species: †D. weii

Binomial name
- †Dsungaripterus weii Young, 1964

= Dsungaripterus =

Dsungaripterus Temporal range: Early Cretaceous, Valanginian

Genus of dsungaripterid pterosaur from the Early Cretaceous

Dsungaripterus is a genus of dsungaripterid pterosaur which lived during the Early Cretaceous in what is now China and possibly South Korea. Its fossils come from the Wuerho Pterosaur Fauna group (WPF) of the Tugulu Group, comprising sections of the Lianmuqin and Shengjinkou Formations of the Junggar Basin. Both formations have been given various age estimates, with data suggesting at least some of the WPF date to the middle Valanginian, but the upper and lower bounds of these pterosaur bearing deposits remain unclear.

== Description ==
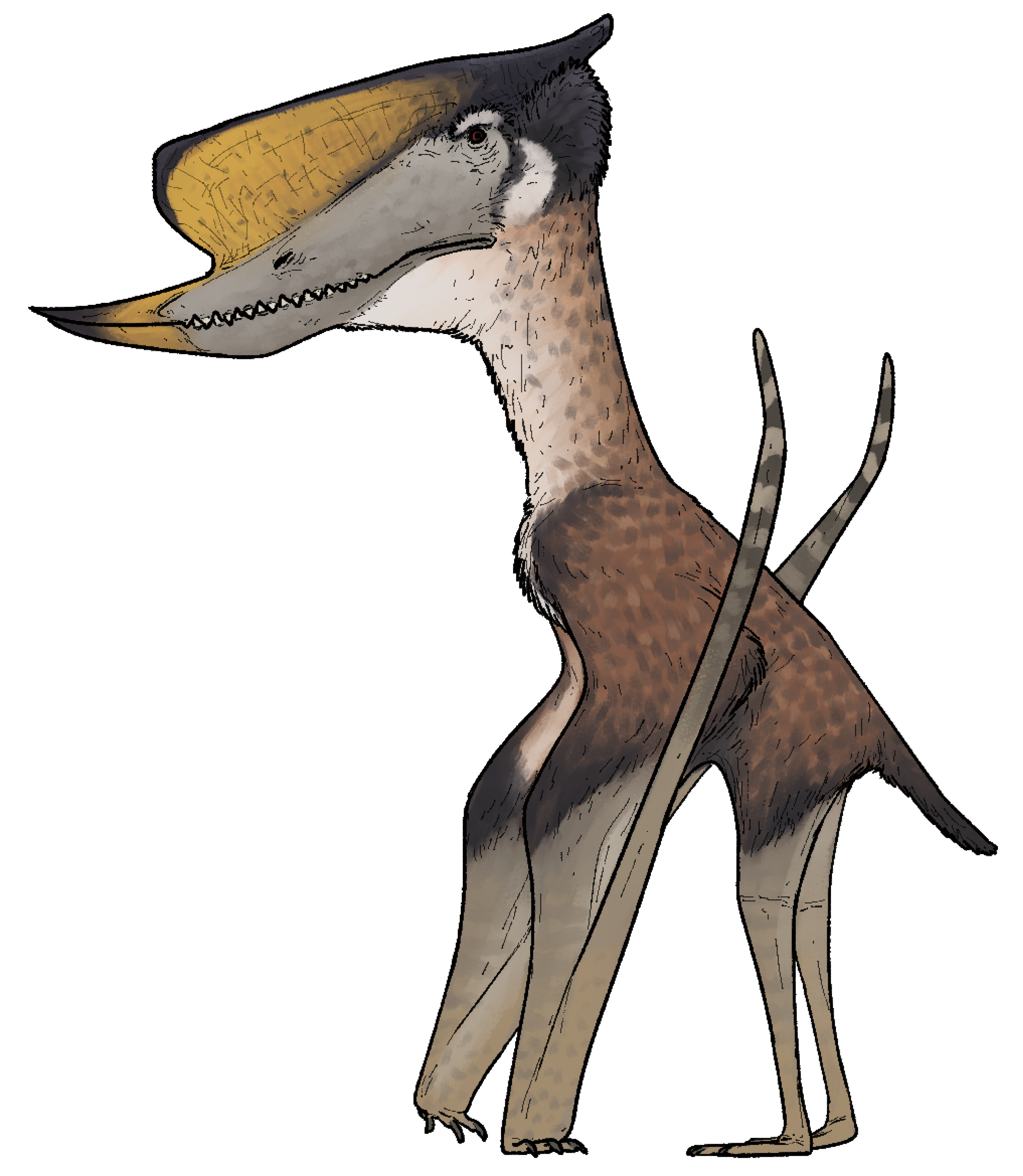
Restoration of Dsungaripterus

Dsungaripterus weii had a wingspan of 3–3.5 metres (9.8–11.5 ft). Like most dsungaripteroids it had a rather robust skeleton with thick walls and stouty bodily proportions, suggesting a mostly terrestrial lifestyle. The flight style of these animals is unclear, but it was probably punctuated by abrupt landings and extensive flapping.

The skull of Dsungaripterus, measuring over 46 centimeters (18 in) long, bore a low bone crest that ran down from the base of the skull to halfway to the beak. Dsungaripterus's head and neck were together almost 1 meter (3.3 ft) long. Its most notable feature are its long, narrow, upcurved jaws with a pointed tip. It had no teeth in the front part of its jaws, which were probably used to remove prey from cracks in rocks and/or the sandy, muddy inland environments it inhabited. It had knobbly flat teeth more to the back of the jaw that were well suited for crushing the armor of shellfish or other hard objects. Thus, it is commonly interpreted that dsungaripterids were durophagous and possibly piscivorous pterosaurs. Additionally, Dsungaripterus also had a palate similar to that of azhdarchoids.

== History of discovery ==
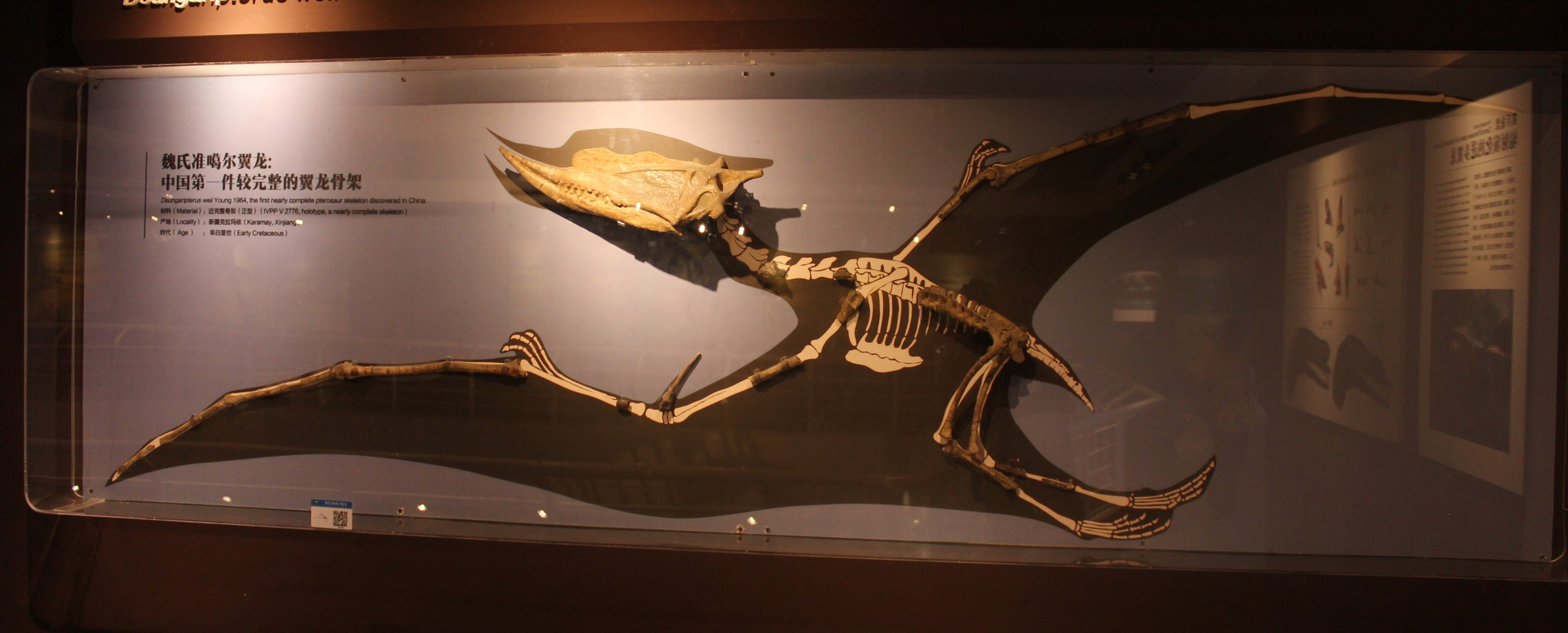
Holotype specimen, Paleozoological Museum of China

Dsungaripterus was described in 1964 named by Yang Zhongjian. The genus name combines a reference to the Junggar Basin with a Latinized Greek pteron, "wing". The type species is Dsungaripterus weii, the specific name honoring paleontologist C.M. Wei of the Palaeontological Division, Institute of Science, Bureau of Petroleum of Xinjiang. The holotype is IVPP V-2776, a partial skull and skeleton from the Lianmuqin Formation. In 1973, more material has been found within the Shengjinkou Formation, which includes almost complete skulls.

In 1980 Peter Galton renamed Pterodactylus brancai (Reck 1931) from the Tendaguru Formation into Dsungaripterus brancai, but the identification is now commonly rejected. In 1982 Natasha Bakhurina named a new species, Dsungaripterus parvus, based on a smaller skeleton from Mongolia. Later, this was renamed into "Phobetor", a preoccupied name, and in 2009 concluded to be identical to Noripterus. A dsungaripterid wing finger phalanx was reported in 2002 from the Hasandong Formation of South Korea, and was identified in 2015 and 2018 as Dsungaripterus? cf. D. weii.

== Classification ==
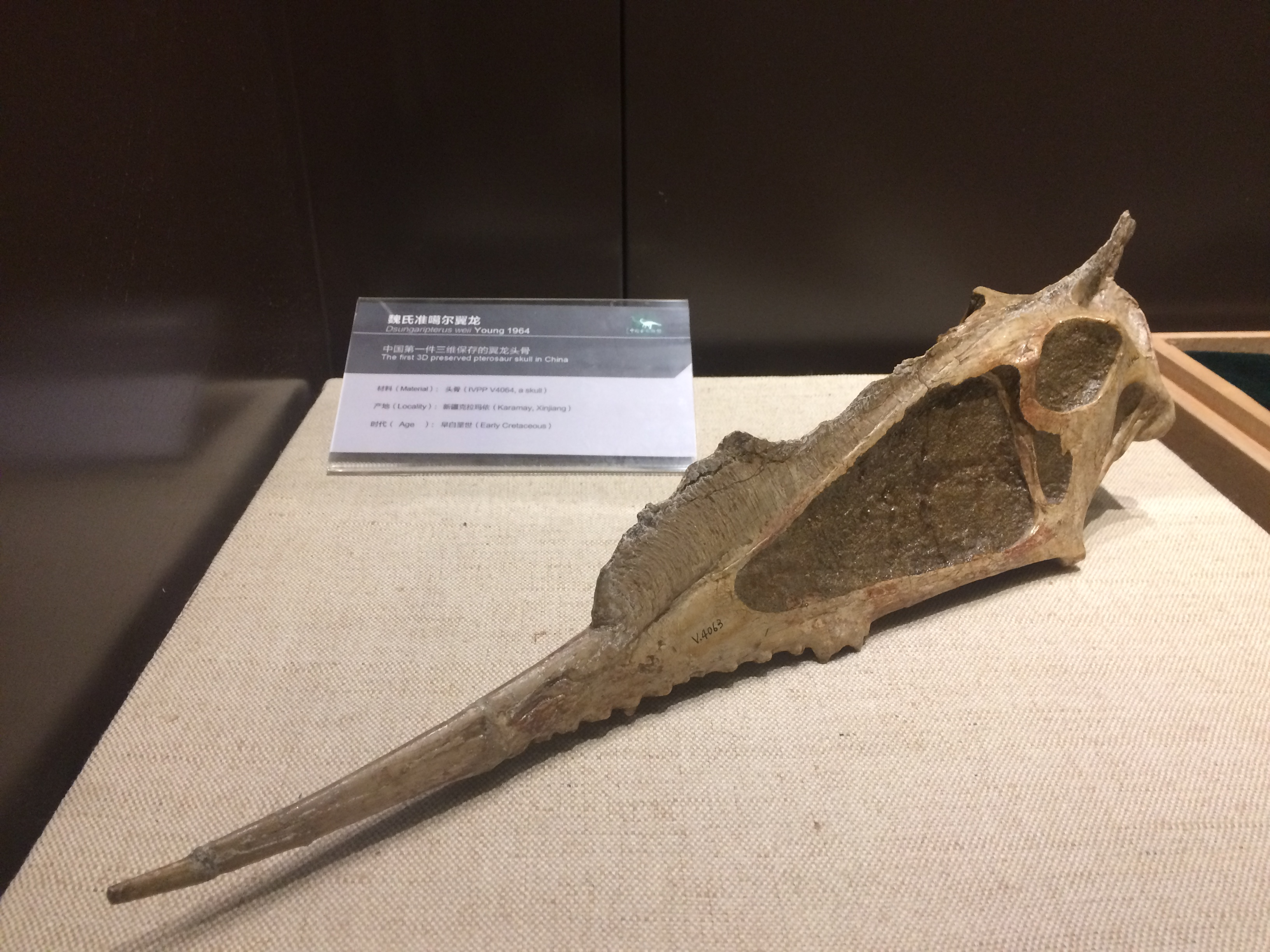
Skull IVPP V4064, Paleozoological Museum of China

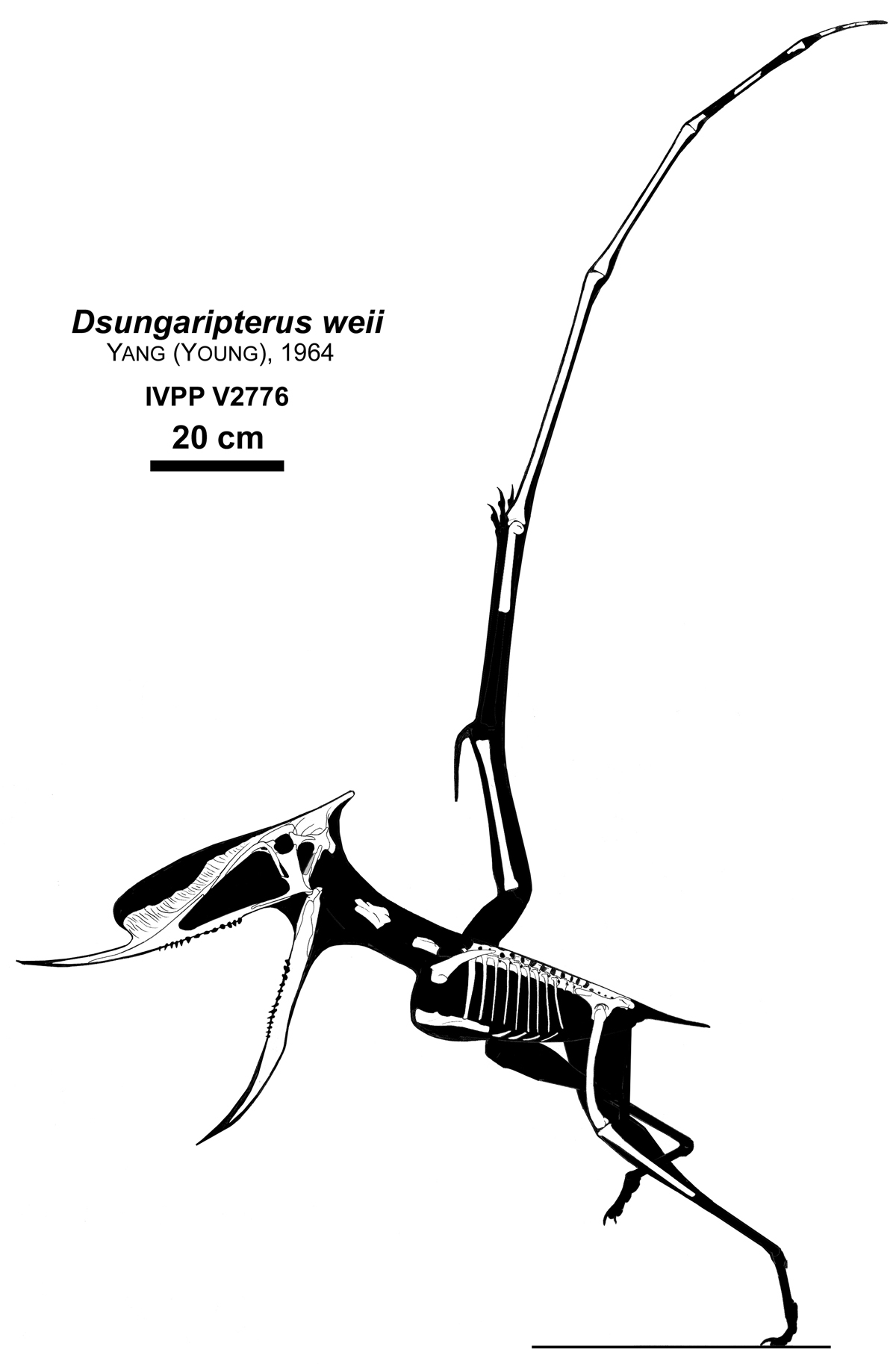
Skeletal reconstruction

Dsungaripterus was classified by Yang as a member of the Dsungaripteridae. Below is a cladogram showing the results of a phylogenetic analysis presented by Andres and colleagues in 2014. They recovered Dsungaripterus within the clade Dsungaripteromorpha (a subgroup within the Azhdarchoidea), more specifically within the Dsungaripteridae, sister taxon to Domeykodactylus. Their cladogram is shown below.

- Dsungaripteromorpha
  - Dsungaripteridae
    - Dsungaripterinae
      - Dsungaripterus weii
      - Domeykodactylus ceciliae
    - Noripterinae
      - Noripterus parvus
      - Noripterus complicidens
  - Thalassodrominae
    - Thalassodromeus sethi
    - - Tupuxuara longicristatus
      - Tupuxuara leonardii

In 2019, a different topology, this time by Kellner and colleagues, was published. In this study, Dsungaripterus was recovered outside the Azhdarchoidea, within the larger group Tapejaroidea, sister taxon to Noripterus. The cladogram of the analysis is shown below.

- Tapejaroidea
  - Dsungaripteridae
    - Dsungaripterus weii
    - Noripterus parvus
  - Azhdarchoidea
    - - Azhdarchidae
      - Chaoyangopteridae
    - Tapejaromorpha
      - Keresdrakon vilsoni
      - Tapejaridae
        - Thalassodrominae
        - Tapejarinae

== See also ==
- List of pterosaur genera
- Timeline of pterosaur research
