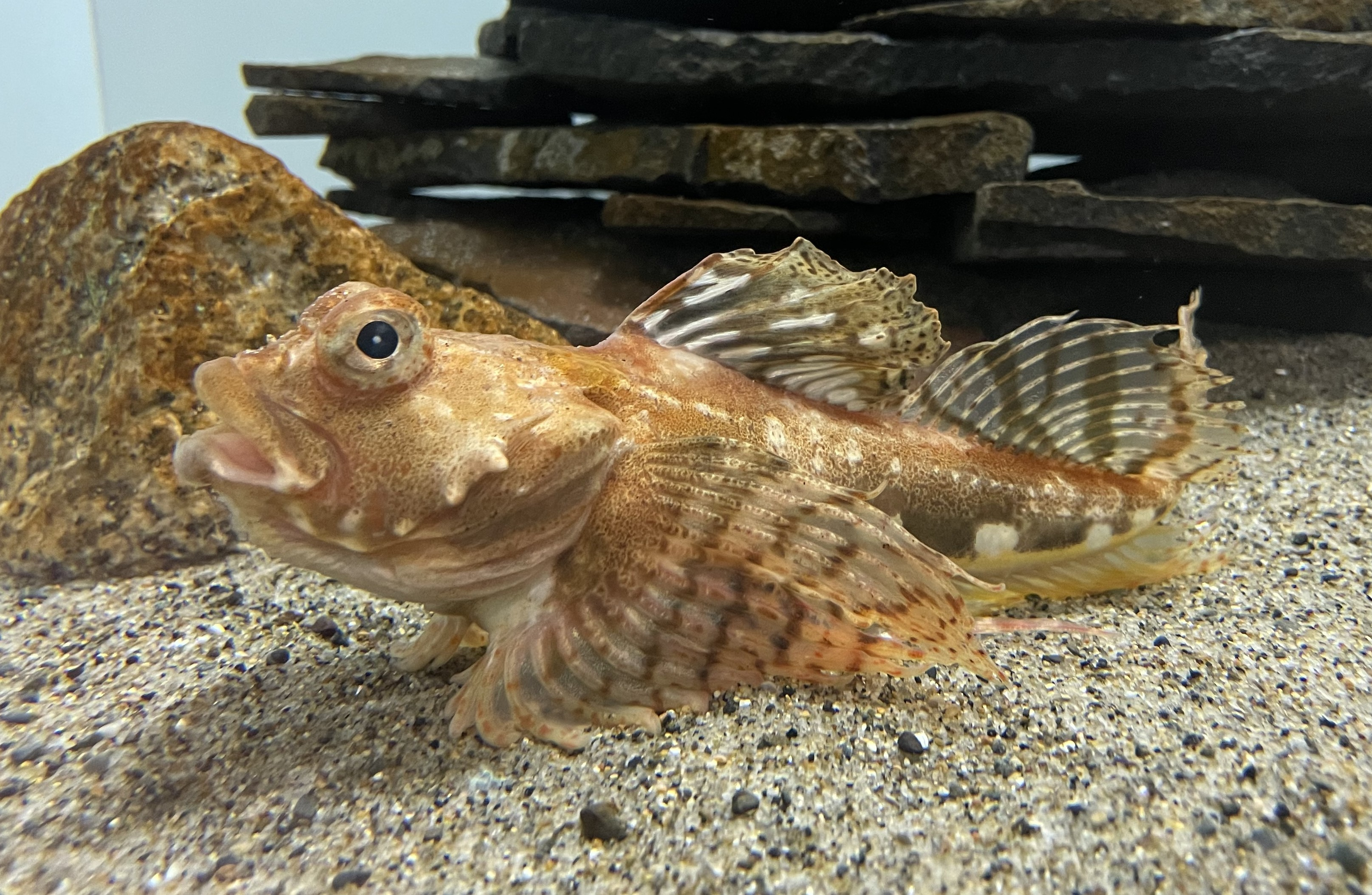

Conservation status
- Least Concern (IUCN 3.1)

Scientific classification
- Kingdom: Animalia
- Phylum: Chordata
- Class: Actinopterygii
- Division: Teleostei
- Order: Perciformes
- Suborder: Cottoidei
- Family: Psychrolutidae
- Genus: Gymnocanthus
- Species: G. tricuspis

Binomial name
- Gymnocanthus tricuspis (Reinhardt, 1830)

Synonyms
- Cottus tricuspis Reinhardt, 1830; Gymnacanthus tricuspis orientalis Schmidt, 1927; Phobetor tricuspis Krøyer, 1844

= Arctic staghorn sculpin =

Species of fish

The Arctic staghorn sculpin (Gymnocanthus tricuspis) is a species of marine ray-finned fish belonging to the family Cottidae, the typical sculpins. This sculpin is found in the Arctic Ocean and the northern Atlantic Ocean.

== Taxonomy ==
The Arctic staghorn sculpin was first formally described as Cottus tricuspis in 1830 by the Danish zoologist Johan Reinhardt with the type locality given as Greenland. The specific name tricuspis means "three cusps", a reference to the three cusps on the upper spine on the preoperculum.

== Description ==
The Arctic staghorn sculpin has dorsal fins supported by between 10 and 12 spines and between 14 and 17 soft rays while the anal fin has 15 to 19 soft rays. It has a dark upper body with two blackish brown bands on the flanks being made up of dark blotches. There is an irregular line of dark spots underneath the lateral line and the underside is pale, yellowish in females, the males having roundish white spots on their bellies. The dorsal fins have light and dark stripes while the caudal, anal and pectoral fins are pale, with a yellow tip and 4-5 diagonal lines of dark spots in the pectoral fins. There are flat, bony plates on the back and the top of the head. The scales of the lateral line scales are tubules embedded in the skin. There are no, or just a few, cirri on the head or body. The uppermost spine on the preoperculum is long and has 1 or more recurved spinules on its upper surface. This species is identified from its congeners by the lack of tubercles to the rear of the eyes and on the nape, a thinner interorbital space which has a width of less than 10% the length of the head and by the possession of many small plates between the eyes. This species has a maximum published total length of 30 cm (12 in).

== Distribution and habitat ==
The Arctic staghorn sculpin is found in the Arctic Ocean and the northeastern and northwestern Atlantic Ocean. In North American waters it is normally found as far south as the Gulf of St Lawrence, occasionally reaching Maine. In the European waters it ranges from the eastern coasts of Greenland, Iceland, along the northern coast of Norway north to the White Sea and the Barents Sea to Svalbard and Novaya Zemlya. This is a benthic fish which lives in shallow water near to shore down to depths of around 450 m (1,480 ft), although it is normally found at depths of less than 200 m (660 ft). It has been recorded on a variety of substrates including mud, gravel and rock, burrowing into sand and muddy-sand substrates.

== Biology ==
The Arctic staghorn sculpin is a predator of polychaetes, gastropods, krill, benthic amphipods and echiurids. They in turn are preyed on by larger fishes such as Arctic cod, Atlantic cod, Bering flounder and polar eelpout. They spawn in the late autumn to winter, the females laying 2,000 to 5,500 demersal eggs which hatch into pelagic larvae and juveniles which descend to the sea bed at lengths of 20 to 30 mm (0.79 to 1.18 in). They are sexually mature by 5–6 years old or 220 to 260 mm (8.7 to 10.2 in).
