= Shengjinkou Formation =

Geologic formation in Xinjiang, China

- Stratigraphic range: Early Cretaceous, ~Valanginian
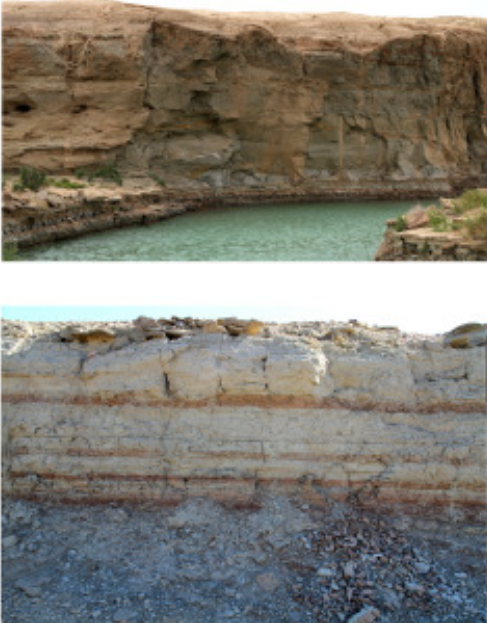
- Two outcrops of the Shengjinkou Formation where the footprints of Pteraichnus wuerhoensis have been discovered. Photographed before 2021.
- Type: Geological formation
- Unit of: Tugulu Group
- Underlies: Lianmuqin Formation
- Overlies: Kalaza Formation

Lithology
- Primary: Mudstone, siltstone

Location
- Coordinates: 46.0°N 85.8°E
- Approximate paleocoordinates: 45.0°N 81.9°E
- Region: Xinjiang Uygur Autonomous Region
- Country: China
- Extent: Junggar Basin

Type section
- Named by: Xia Gongjun
- Year defined: 1956
- Shengjinkou Formation (China) Shengjinkou Formation (Dzungaria)

The Shengjinkou Formation is an Early Cretaceous-aged Konservat-Lagerstätte composed of "interbedded red green and yellow variegated mudstones and siltstones" that is part of the larger Tugulu Group of China. Dinosaur and pterosaur remains have been recovered from the formation. The uppermost layers of the formation have been dated to the Valanginian age.

== History ==
The Shengjikou Formation was first identified in a 1956 manuscript by Xia Gongjun. The type locality is near Turpan City in the Xinjiang Region of China. The first pterosaur and dinosaur remains from the Shengjinkou Formation were identified by 1973, including several skulls belonging to Dsungaripterus weii and indeterminate sauropod remains possibly belonging to Asiatosaurus mongoliensis.

In 2006 from the Hami region in Xinjiang, the Shengjinkou Formation, a Konservat-Lagerstätte was reported, in this case lake sediments allowing for an exceptional preservation of fossils. The same year, Qiu Zhanxiang and Wang Banyue started official excavations. Part of the finds consisted of dense concentrations of pterosaur bones, associated with soft tissues and eggs. The site represented a nesting colony that storm floods had covered with mud. Dozens of individuals could be secured from a total that in 2014 was estimated to run into the many hundreds.

Dinosaur footprints were collected from the formation before 2011 and isolated specimens were collected by the local Moguicheng Dinosaur and Bizarre Stone Museum; more specimens were discovered between 2015 and 2019.

Dinosaur fossils and pterosaur footprints were reported again from the formation in 2021 and dinosaur footprints were first reported from the formation in 2023.

== Paleofauna ==
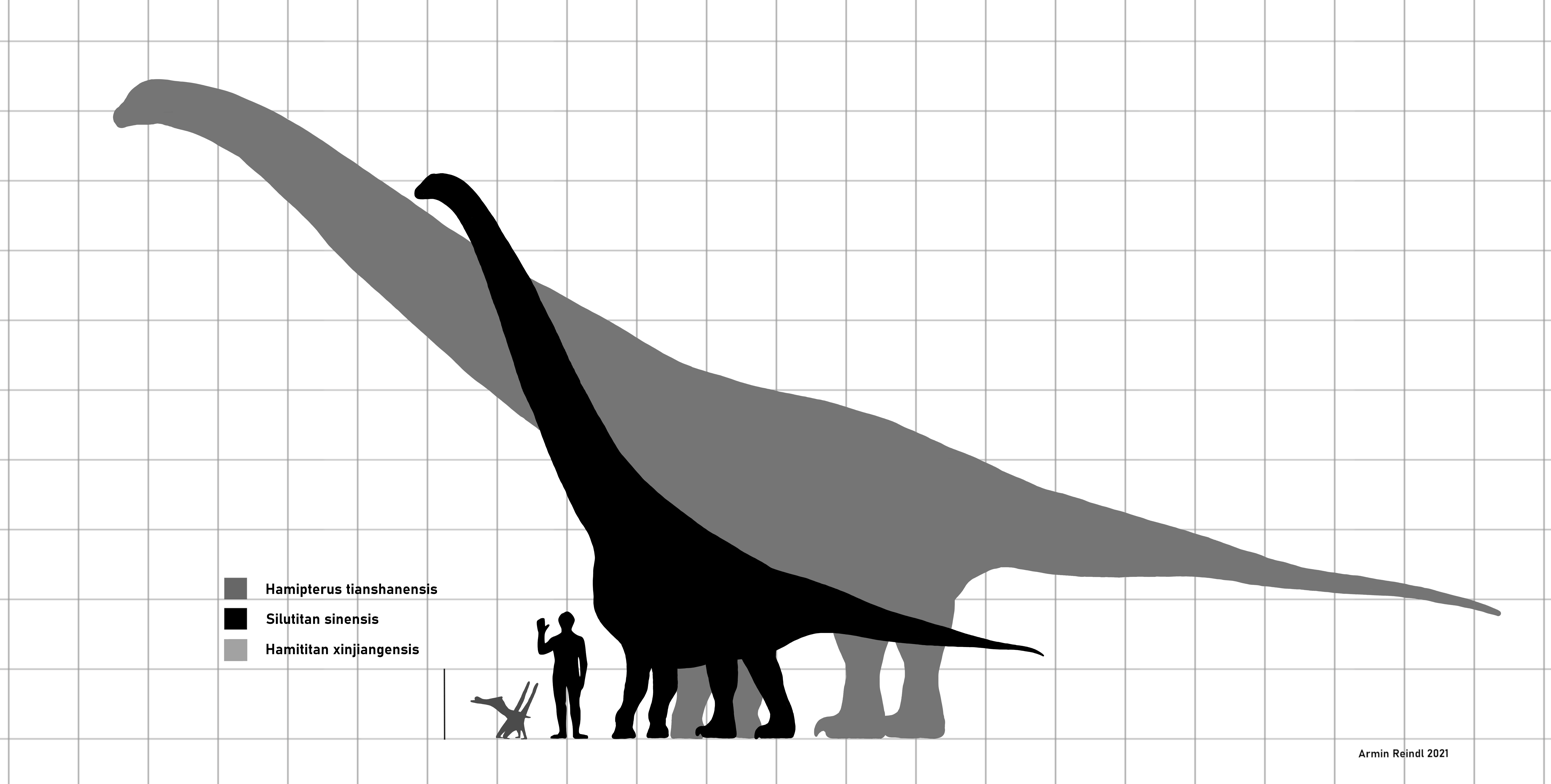
Size comparison of fauna from the Shengjinkou Formation that were named between 2014 and 2021

- cf. Asiatosaurus mongoliensis
- Deltapodus curriei
- Dsungaripterus weii
- Noripterus complicidens
- cf. Eubrontes
- Hamipterus tianshanensis
- Hamititan xinjiangensis
- Pteraichnus wuerhoensis
- Silutitan sinensis
- Somphospondyli (?) indet. (=Sauropoda indet.)
- Theropoda indet.
- Uighuroniscus sinkiangensis
- Manasichthys tuguluensis
- Manasichthys elongates
- Dsungarichthys bilineatus
- Bogdaichthys fukangensis
- Bogdaichthys serratus
