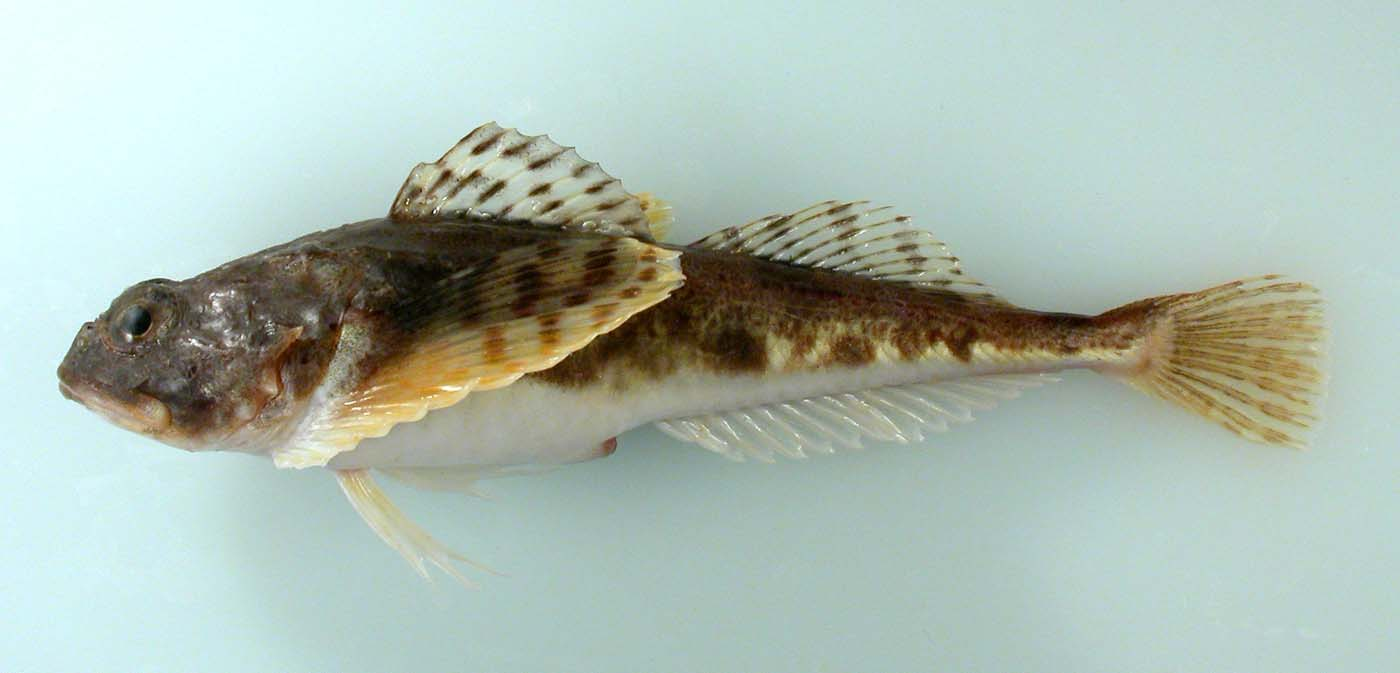
- Arctic staghorn sculpin (G. tricuspis)
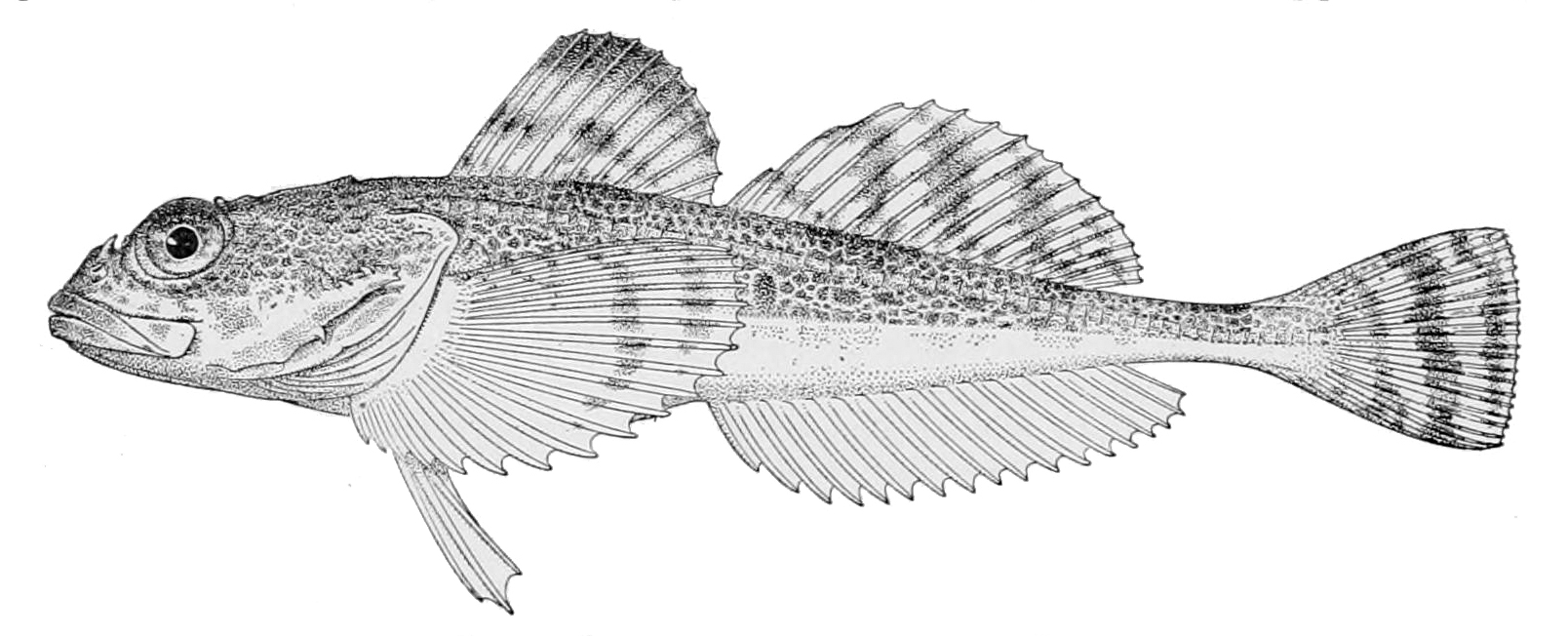
- G. detrisus

Scientific classification
- Kingdom: Animalia
- Phylum: Chordata
- Class: Actinopterygii
- Order: Perciformes
- Suborder: Cottoidei
- Family: Psychrolutidae
- Genus: Gymnocanthus; Swainson, 1839

Type species
- Cottus ventralis Cuvier, 1829

Synonyms
- Elaphocottus Sauvage, 1878; Phobetor Krøyer, 1845; Sclerocottus Fischer, 1885

= Gymnocanthus =

Genus of fishes

Gymnocanthus is a genus of marine ray-finned fishes belonging to the family Cottidae, the typical sculpins. These fishes are found in the northern Pacific, Arctic and northern Atlantic Oceans.

== Taxonomy ==
Gymnocanthus was first proposed as a monospecific genus in 1839 by the English zoologist William Swainson with Cottus ventralis, which had been described in 1829 by the French zoologist Georges Cuvier from Kamchatka, as its only species. Cottus ventralis was later shown to be a synonym of Cottus pistilliger, a species which Peter Simon Pallas had described in 1814 from Alaska.The 5th edition of Fishes of the World classifies this genus within the subfamily Cottinae of the family Cottidae, however, other authors classify the genus within the subfamily Icelinae of the family Psychrolutidae.

== Etymology ==
Gymnocanthus is a combination of gymnos, meaning "bare" or "naked", and acanthus, which means "thorn" or "spine", Swainson did not explain what this alluded to. It may refer to the head of the type species, which was described as scaleless, although it is actually covered or partially covered with large plates, and which has "few" spines, or it may be a reference to the scaleless preopercular spine and cusps.

== Species ==
Gymnocanthus has seven recognized species in this genus, of these five are native to the northern Pacific Ocean, whereas one lives in arctic waters adjacent to the Atlantic, and one in the central Atlantic:

- Gymnocanthus detrisus C. H. Gilbert & Burke, 1912
- Gymnocanthus galeatus T. H. Bean, 1881 (Armorhead sculpin)
- Gymnocanthus herzensteini D. S. Jordan & Starks, 1904
- Gymnocanthus intermedius (Temminck & Schlegel, 1843)
- Gymnocanthus pistilliger (Pallas, 1814) (Threaded sculpin)
- Gymnocanthus tricuspis (J. C. H. Reinhardt, 1830) (Arctic staghorn sculpin)
- Gymnocanthus vandesandei Poll, 1949
