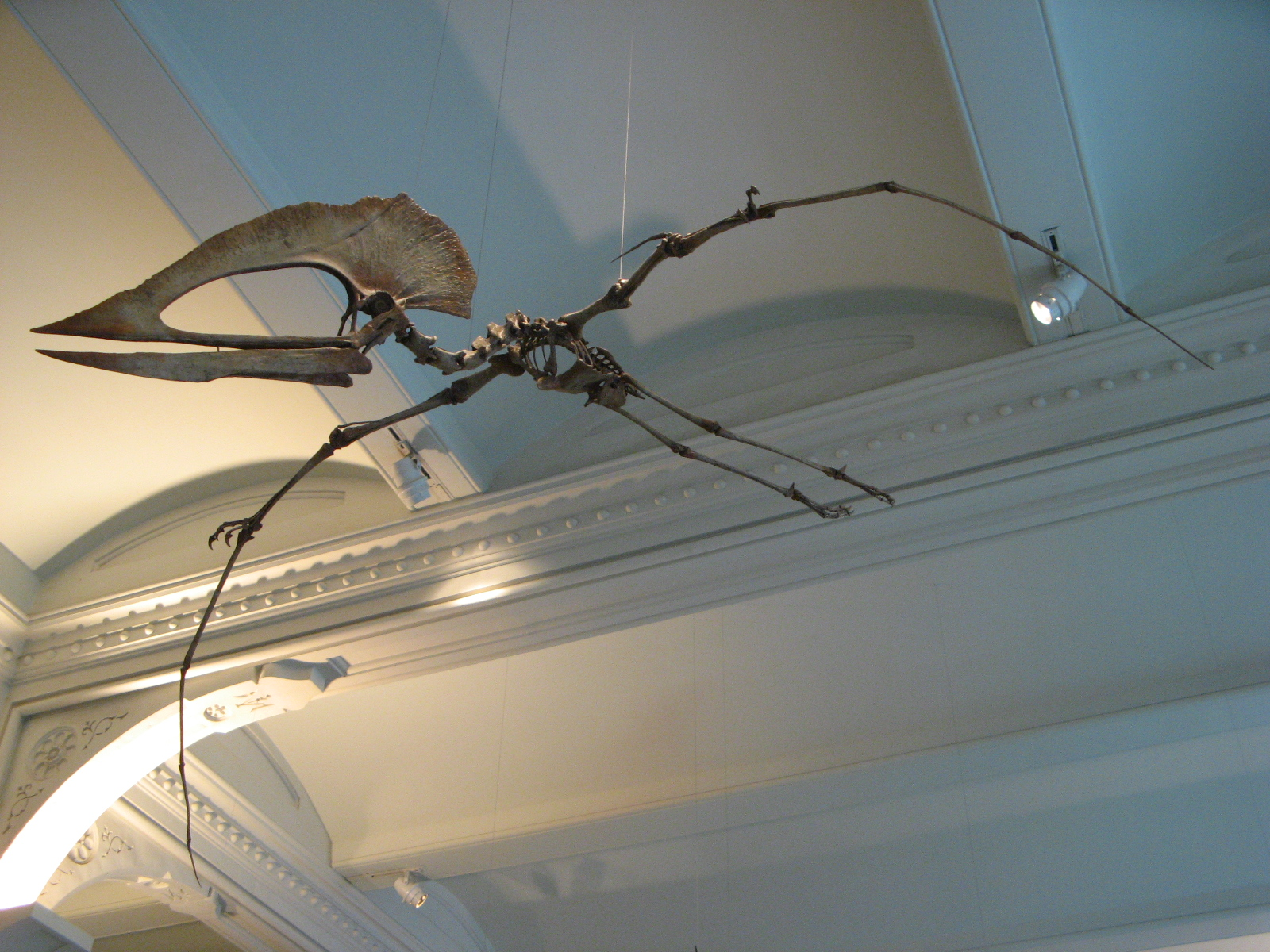
- Reconstructed skeleton of T. leonardii, American Museum of Natural History

Scientific classification
- Kingdom: Animalia
- Phylum: Chordata
- Class: Reptilia
- Order: †Pterosauria
- Suborder: †Pterodactyloidea
- Clade: †Azhdarchoidea
- Family: †Thalassodromidae
- Genus: †Tupuxuara; Kellner & Campos, 1988

Type species
- †Tupuxuara longicristatus Kellner & Campos, 1988

Other species
- †T. leonardii Kellner & Campos, 1994

= Tupuxuara =

Tupuxuara Temporal range: Albian, 112 Ma

Genus of thalassodromid pterosaur from the Early Cretaceous

Tupuxuara is a genus of thalassodromid pterosaur that lived during the Albian age of the Early Cretaceous, about 112 million years ago. Its remains were found in what is now the Romualdo Formation of the Santana Group in Brazil. Tupuxuara was named in 1988 by paleontologists Alexander Kellner and Diógenes de Almeida Campos. The name Tupuxuara means "familiar spirit" referring to a familiar spirit in the mythology of the Tupi people in Brazil. Two species have been named, T. longicristatus, the type species, and T. leonardii. An additional species has been named in 2009, T. deliradamus. However, the validity of this species has been put into question and it may not even belong to Tupuxuara.

Tupuxuara was quite large in size. It had a big crest at the back portion of its head, stemming from the snout. This crest is most likely an indicator of sexual maturity, given that it appears more prominently in mature individuals. The beak of Tupuxuara was toothless. A wingspan of 4.7 m (15 ft) and a body mass of 25 kg (55 lb) have been estimated for Tupuxuara, indicating that it had long wings with respect to its mass.

The classification history of Tupuxuara has been quite controversial. It was initially assigned to the family Tapejaridae, grouped with the closely related Thalassodromeus in a subfamily called Thalassodrominae. However, several studies have argued against this arrangement and have supported a closer relationship with the families Azhdarchidae and Dsungaripteridae, with Thalassodrominae being elevated to family level, thus creating the term Thalassodromidae. All three families would be grouped in a clade called Neoazhdarchia. More recently, studies that support a tapejarid identity for Tupuxuara have also favored the denomination Thalassodromidae to have consistency, which would effectively remove the group from Tapejaridae. Nonetheless, they would find thalassodromids and tapejarids to group together in a clade called Tapejaromorpha. Early studies had suggested that Tupuxuara was piscivorous (a fish eater), with some even suggesting a fruit-based diet. However, based on its azhdarchoid lineage, Tupuxuara most likely would have been a terrestrial omnivore or carnivore.

== Discovery and history ==
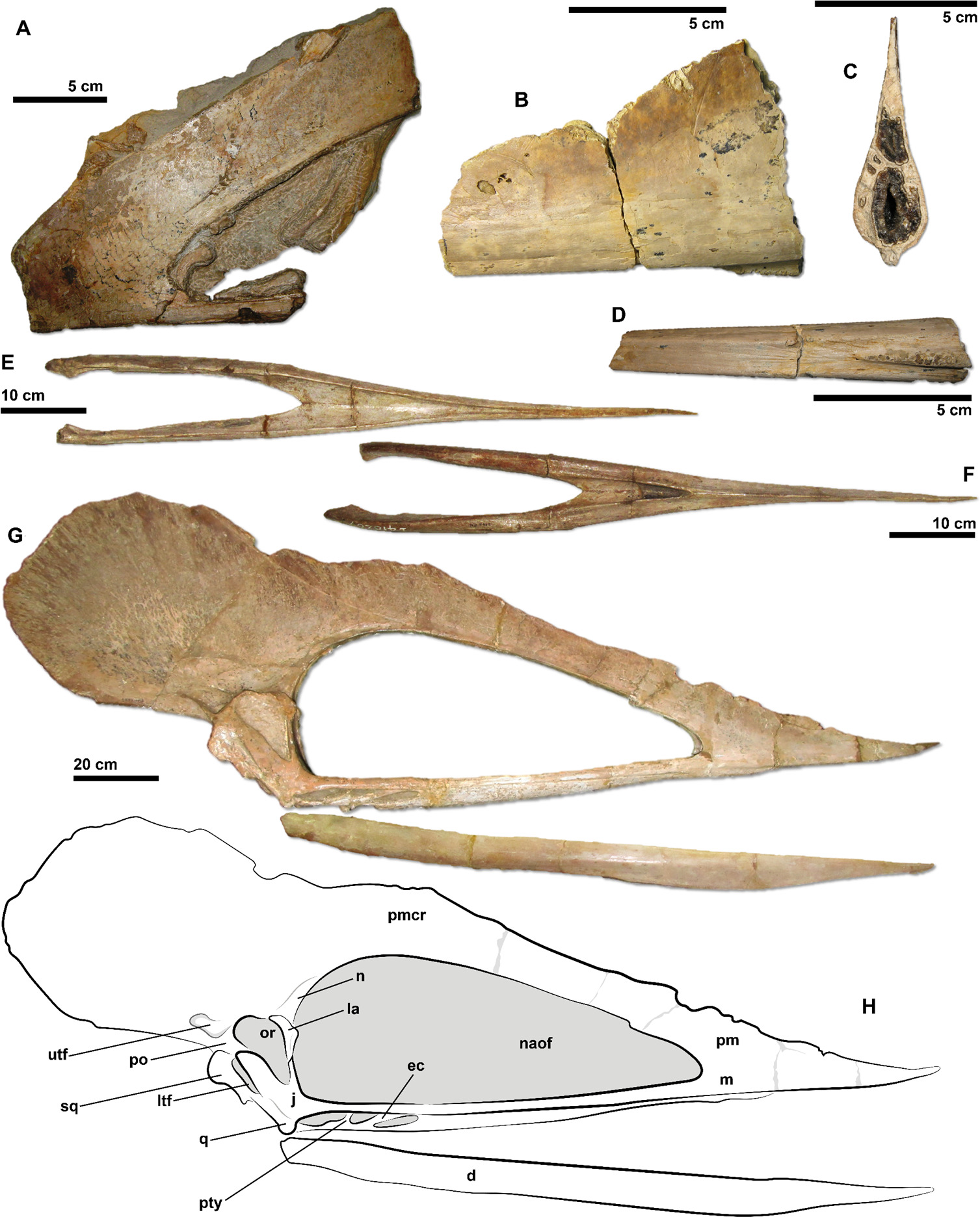
Holotypes and assigned T. longicristatus and T. leonardii specimens

Tupuxuara was named and described by Brazilian paleontologists Alexander Kellner and Diógenes de Almeida Campos in 1988. The type species is Tupuxuara longicristatus. The generic name Tupuxuara means "familiar spirit", referring to a familiar spirit from the mythology of the Tupi people in Brazil. The specific name longicristatus means "long-crested" in Latin.

The holotype specimen, MN 6591-V, was found in the Santana Formation (now known as the Romualdo Formation) of Brazil, a rock formation dating back to the Albian stage of the Early Cretaceous period. The holotype consists of a snout and some partial wing bones.

In 1994, Kellner and Campos named a second species, Tupuxuara leonardii. The specific name honors Giuseppe Leonardi, an Italian geologist and paleontologist. The holotype specimen is MN 6592-V, a fragmentary skull with a more rounded crest than the type species T. longicristatus. Other similar material has been referred to T. leonardii as well.

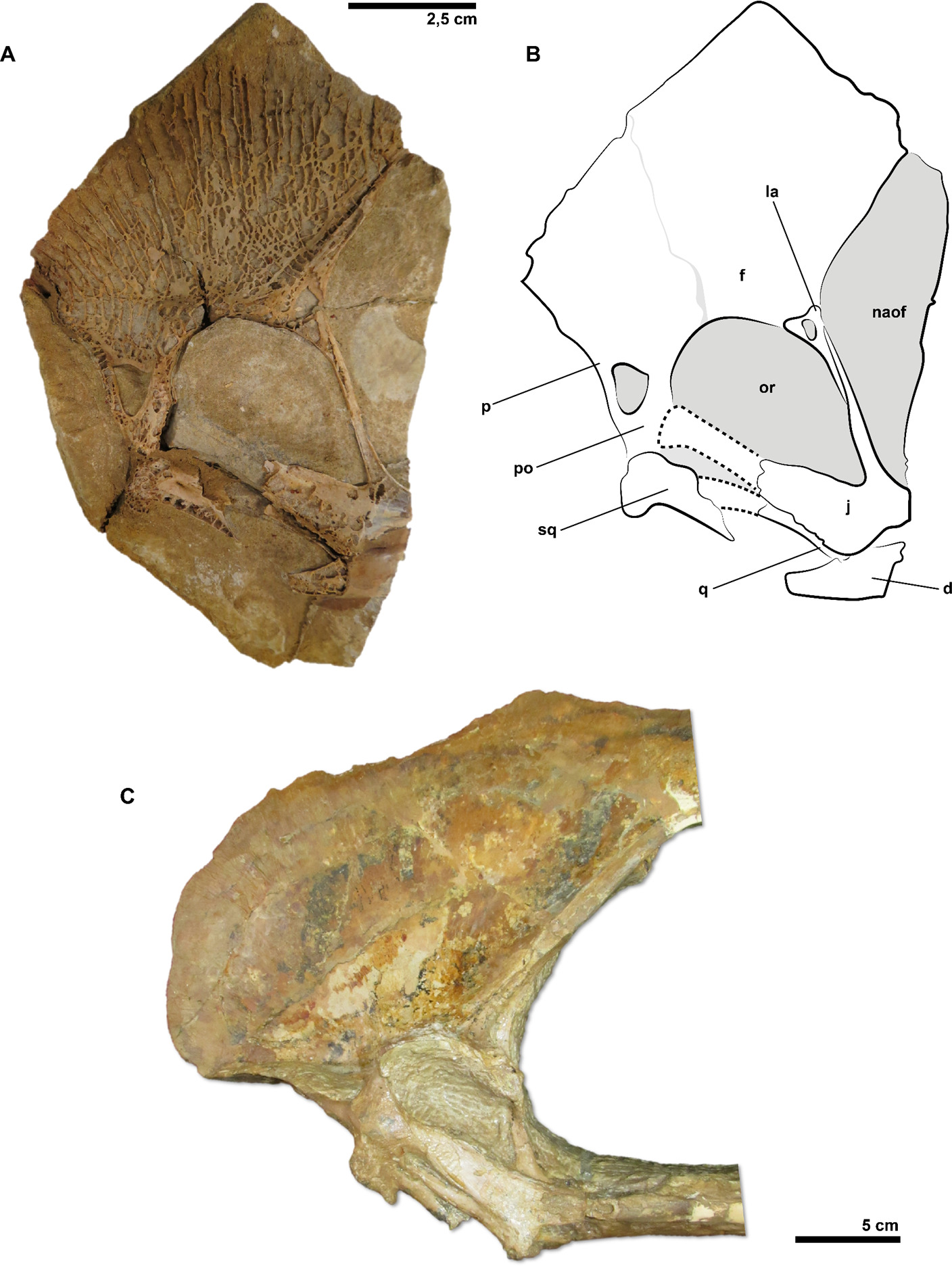
Holotype and asssigned T. deliradamus specimens

In 2009, British paleontologist Mark Witton named a purported third species, Tupuxuara deliradamus. The holotype is SMNK PAL 6410, a skull. Another skull is the paratype: KPMNH DL 84. The specific name is derived from Latin delirus, "insane" or "crazy", and adamas, "invincible", but also the word from which "diamond" is derived. The species has a distinctive diamond-shaped skull opening and low eye sockets. The name is a tribute to the song "Shine On You Crazy Diamond" by Pink Floyd, one of Witton's favorite bands. However, this species has been considered as a nomen dubium (dubious name) by Kellner in 2013. A 2023 study by Brazilian paleontologist Gabriela Cerqueira and colleagues also classified T. deliradamus as a nomen dubium. It was recovered as an indeterminate member of the subfamily Tapejarinae and as the sister taxon of the species Caupedactylus ybaka, effectively removing it from the genus Tupuxuara.

== Description ==
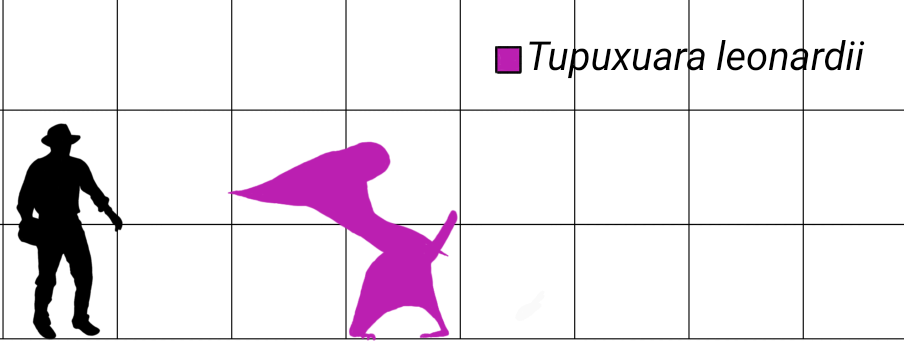
Size of T. leonardii compared to a human

Tupuxuara was a fairly large pterosaur in terms in size. The most distinguishing characteristic of Tupuxuara is the large crest that it possessed, which protruded from the back portion its head and originated from its snout. This crest consisted primarily of bone. This feature was more prominent in mature individuals. More recently found fossil material show considerable variation in morphology. Some researchers explain this as intra-specific variability, being caused by a difference in age or sex. Others even assume that it is due to different species being present in the discoveries.

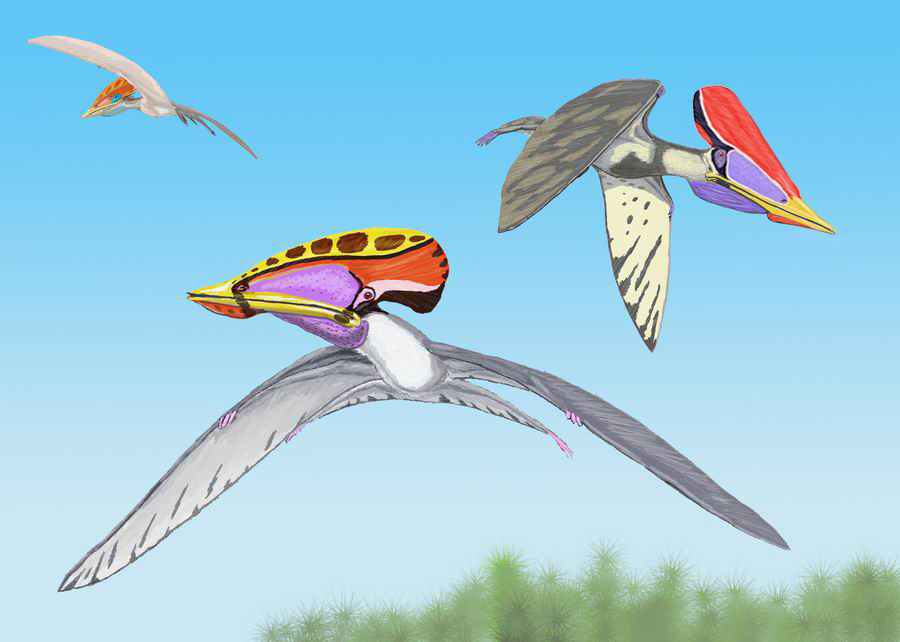
Artist's impression of T. leonardii (left) and T. longicristatus (right)

In his 2022 pterosaur book, American paleontologist Gregory S. Paul indicated that Tupuxuara had a wingspan measuring 4.7 m (15 ft), a total body length of 2 m (6 ft 7 in) and a body mass of 25 kg (55 lb). Paul noted that Tupuxuara had long wings relative to its body mass. Tupuxuara was slightly smaller compared to its closest relative, Thalassodromeus, and it bore a skull that was less heavily built due to its crest having a smaller size. A key difference between the two species of Tupuxuara is the structure of the crest. The type species, T. longicristatus, featured a more elongated crest, as its name suggests, while T. leonardii featured a more rounded crest in terms of shape.

== Classification ==
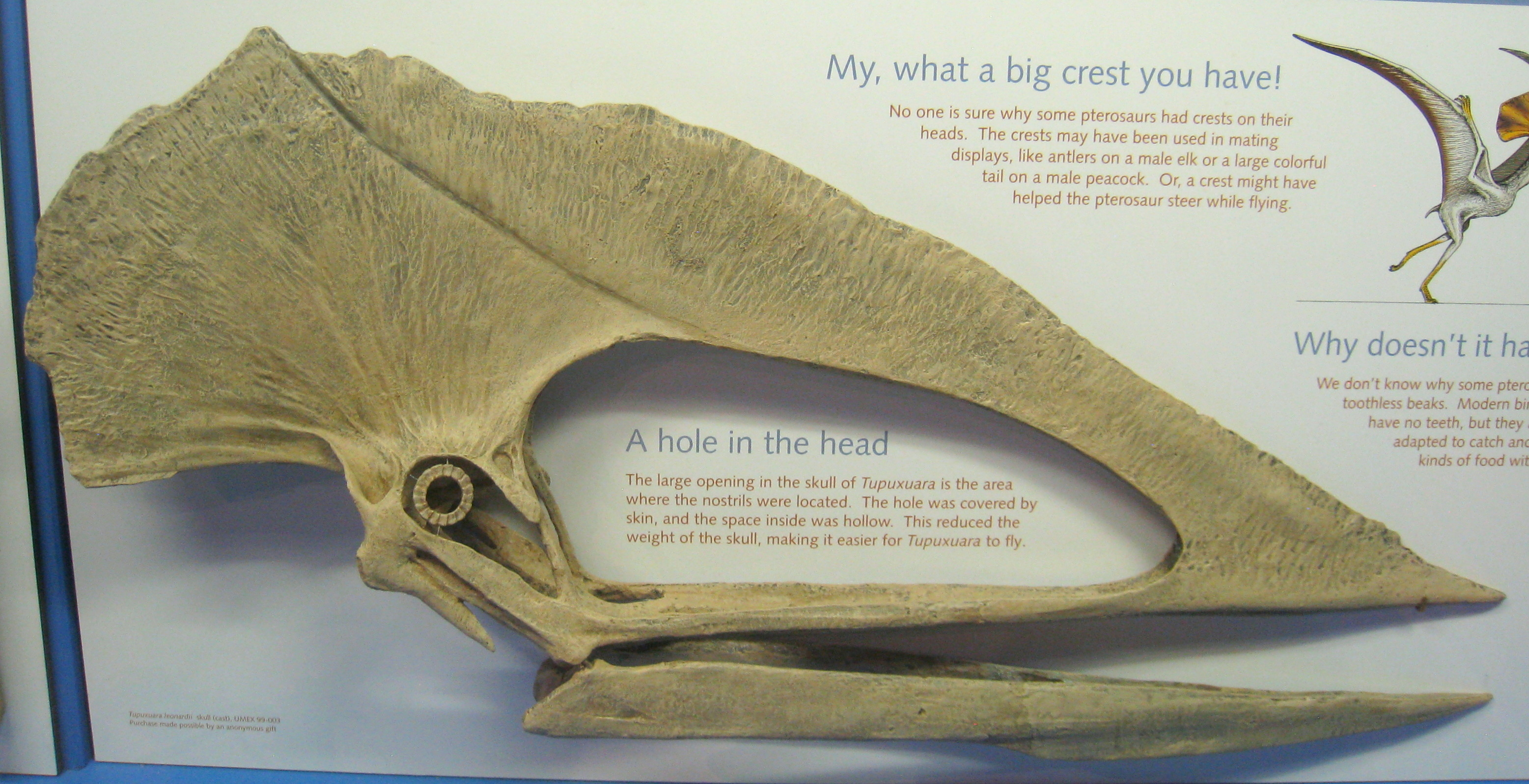
Restored skull of T. leonardii

Tupuxuara was initially assigned to the family Tapejaridae in its description by Kellner, closely related to the pterosaur Tapejara. Within Tapejaridae, its closest relative was Thalassodromeus, indicated by their bony crest, a characteristic only shared by them in the family. Meanwhile, other tapejarids bore a crest mostly consisting of soft tissue. In 2007, Kellner and Campos divided Tapejaridae into the subfamilies Tapejarinae and Thalassodrominae, with Tupuxuara being a member of the latter, alongside Thalassodromeus. Tapejaridae itself was recovered within the superfamily Azhdarchoidea. This arrangement would later be supported by many different studies.

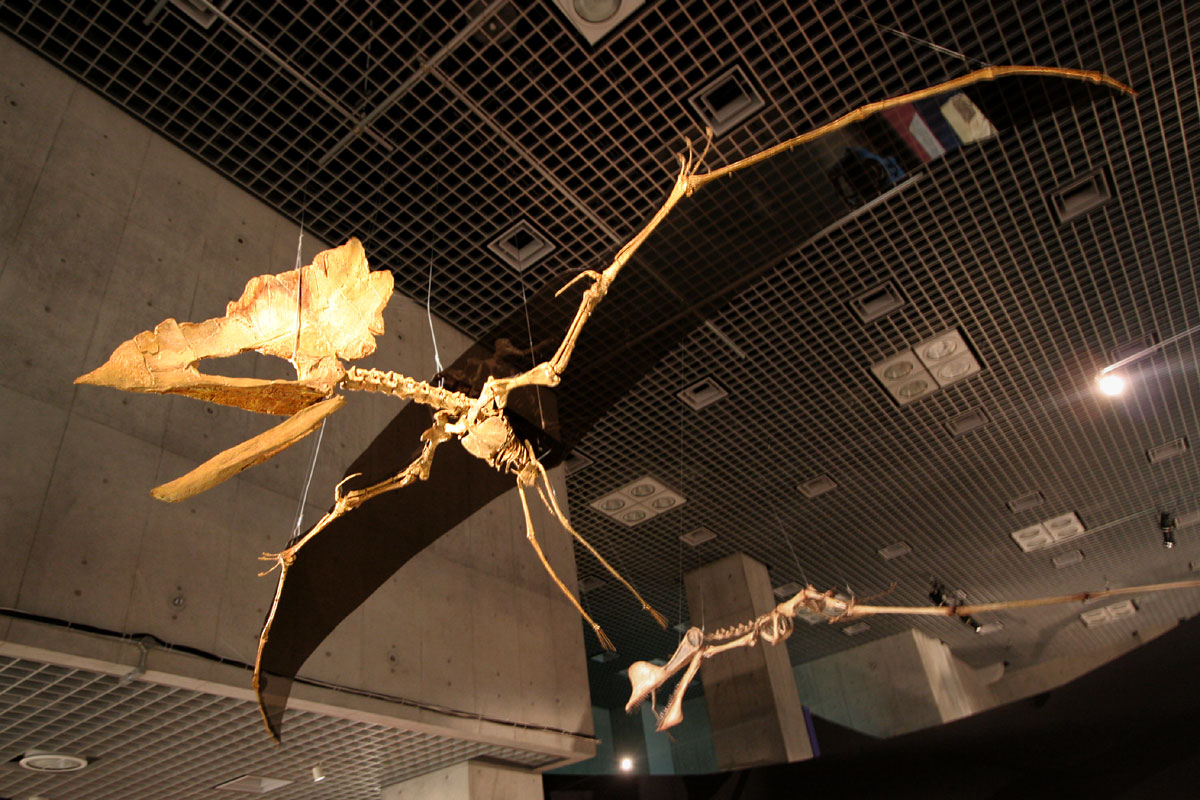
Reconstructed skeleton of the related Thalassodromeus in the National Museum of Nature and Science in Tokyo, Japan

However, conflicting studies also arose. A new group had been named in 2003 by paleontologist David Unwin, the Neoazhdarchia, containing Tupuxuara and the family Azhdarchidae. This new group, like the Tapejaridae, would be inside Azhdarchoidea. In 2006, this arrangement would be further supported by British paleontologists David Martill and Darren Naish, who found Tapejaridae to be paraphyletic (unnatural), and found both Tupuxuara and Thalassodromeus as sister taxa to the Azhdarchidae. Later, in a study by Chinese paleontologist Lü Junchang and colleagues in 2008, the name "Tupuxuaridae" would be used to include Tupuxuara and Thalassodromeus. However, in 2009, Witton stated that it had never been a validly established name, arguing that Thalassodrominae should be the proper name for the group containing Tupuxuara and Thalassodromeus. Witton supported the concept of the group Neoazhdarchia, so he further converted the subfamily Thalassodrominae into its own family called Thalassodromidae, and included it within said group. A few subsequent studies would support this model and would further elaborate by grouping Thalassodromidae alongside the family Dsungaripteridae within a group named Dsungaripteromorpha, which itself was nested within Neoazhdarchia.

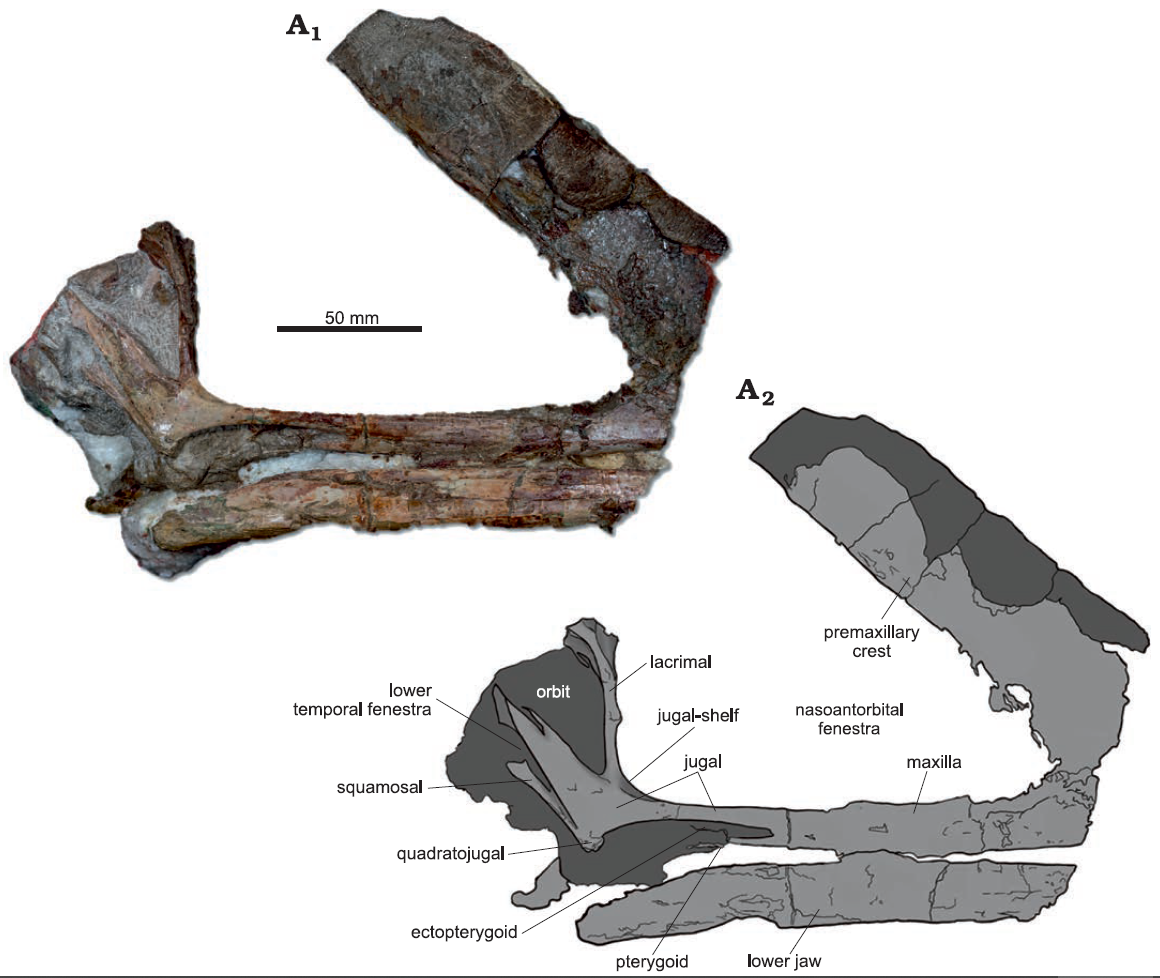
Holotype skull of the closely related Kariridraco, another member of the family Thalassodromidae

Considering that the group containing Tupuxuara and Thalassodromeus has received two different denominations throughout the years, Thalassodromidae and Thalassodrominae, paleontologist Rubi Pêgas and colleagues in 2023 argued that despite the disagreements between the position of said group within Azhdarchoidea, the species contained within it have almost always been the same ones. Therefore, they deemed the difference in naming pattern undesirable. They favored the denomination Thalassodromidae, in order to have consistency with other studies that used the same name. In their analysis, they supported a close relationship between the thalassodromids and the family Tapejaridae, following the classification model established by Kellner. Both Thalassodromidae and Tapejaridae would form the larger group Tapejaromorpha (defined as the most inclusive clade containing Tapejara wellnhoferi but not Azhdarcho lancicollis). Subsequent studies using Kellner's model would also employ the denomination Thalassodromidae instead of Thalassodrominae.

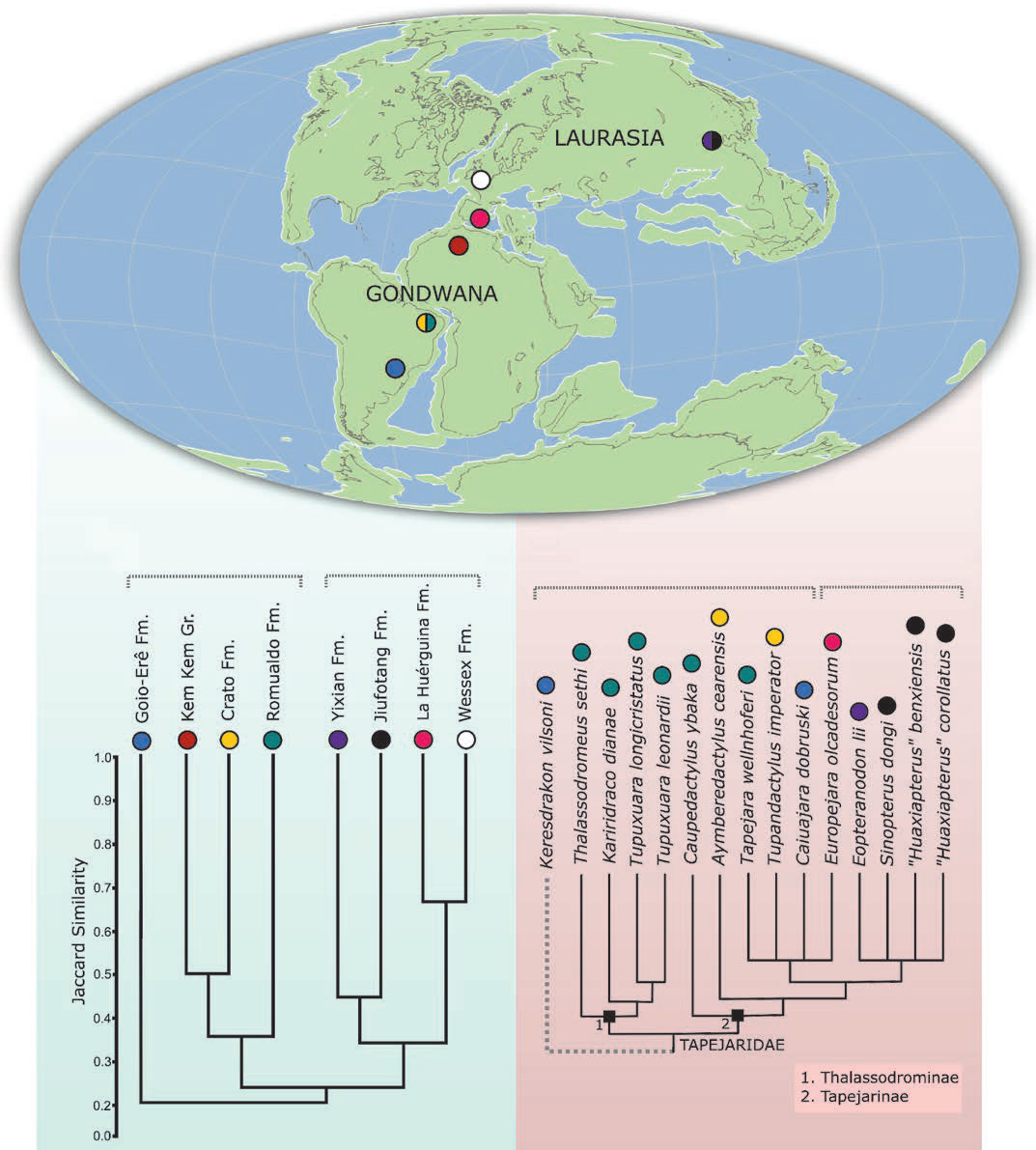
Cretaceous paleomap showing where Tupuxuara (teal) and its relatives have been found

Below are two cladograms showing different conflicting studies regarding the position of Thalassodromidae. The first one is from a phylogenetic analysis by paleontologist Nicholas Longrich and colleagues in 2018. It showcases the interrelationships within Azhdarchoidea, in which Thalassodromidae was recovered as the sister taxon of Dsungaripteridae. Aside from Thalassodromeus, the pterosaurs Alanqa and Aerotitan were also found as thalassodromids. The second cladogram is based on the phylogenetic analysis conducted by Pêgas and colleagues in 2023. In this study, Thalassodromidae consists of the two species of Tupuxuara (T. longicristatus and T. leonardii), Thalassodromeus, and Kariridraco. Both Thalassodromidae and Tapejaridae were found as sister taxa within Tapejaromorpha, corroborating the relationship between the two families.

Topology 1: Longrich and colleagues (2018).

- Azhdarchoidea
  - Tapejaromorpha
  - Neoazhdarchia
    - Neopterodactyloidea
    - Dsungaripteromorpha
      - Dsungaripteridae
      - Thalassodromidae
        - - Tupuxuara longicristatus
          - Tupuxuara leonardii
        - - Thalassodromeus sethi
          - - Alanqa saharica
            - Aerotitan sudamericanus

Topology 2: Pêgas and colleagues (2023).

- Tapejaroidea
  - Dsungaripteridae
  - Azhdarchoidea
    - Azhdarchomorpha
    - Tapejaromorpha
      - Tapejaridae
        - Caupedactylia
        - Eutapejaria
      - Thalassodromidae
        - - Thalassodromeus sethi
          - Thalassodromeus oberlii
        - - Kariridraco dianae
          - - Tupuxuara longicristatus
            - Tupuxuara leonardii

== Paleobiology ==
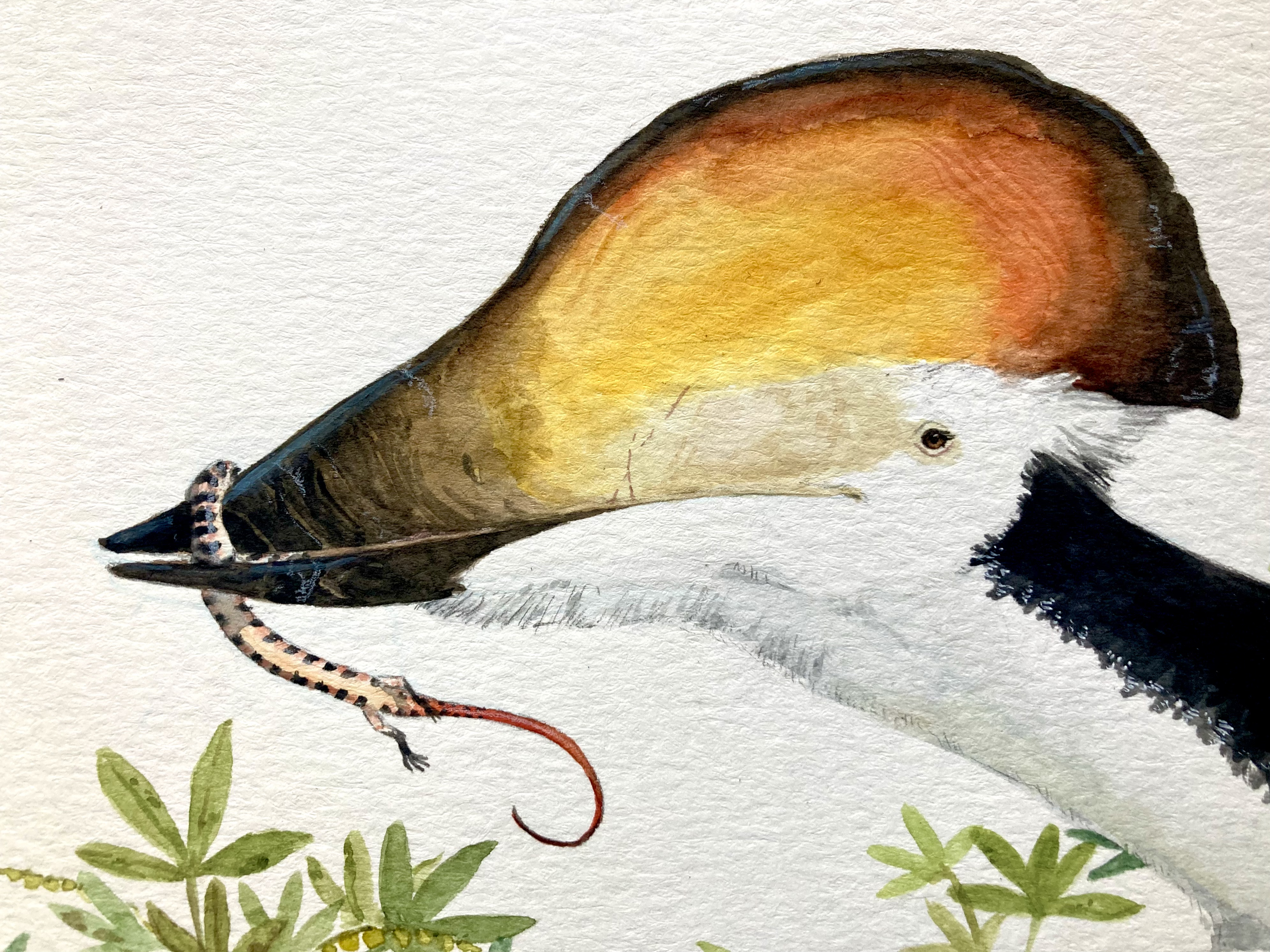
A depiction of Tupuxuara feeding

It has once been suggested that Tupuxuara had a piscivorous (a fish-based) diet, preying in the coasts of modern day South America, while some deviant hypotheses even include the possibility that it was a fruit eater. However, based on its azhdarchoid affinities, it most likely would have been a terrestrial omnivore or carnivore. The closely related Thalassodromeus was specialized for larger prey, while both Tupuxuara species lacked such specializations.

A subadult described by Martill and Naish from the University of Portsmouth in 2006 had not yet fully developed its crest, which supports the suggestion that the crest was a marker for sexual maturity.

Comparisons between the scleral rings of Tupuxuara and modern birds and reptiles suggest that it may have been diurnal.

== See also ==
- List of pterosaur genera
- Timeline of pterosaur research
