= Parakneria spekii =

Conservation status
- Least Concern (IUCN 3.1)

Scientific classification
- Kingdom: Animalia
- Phylum: Chordata
- Class: Actinopterygii
- Order: Gonorynchiformes
- Family: Kneriidae
- Genus: Parakneria
- Species: P. spekii

Binomial name
- Parakneria spekii (Günther, 1868)

Synonyms
- Kneria spekii Günther, 1868; Kneria taeniata Pellegrin, 1922

Species of fish

Parakneria spekii is a species of fish in the family Kneriidae. It is endemic to Tanzania. Its natural habitat is rivers.
