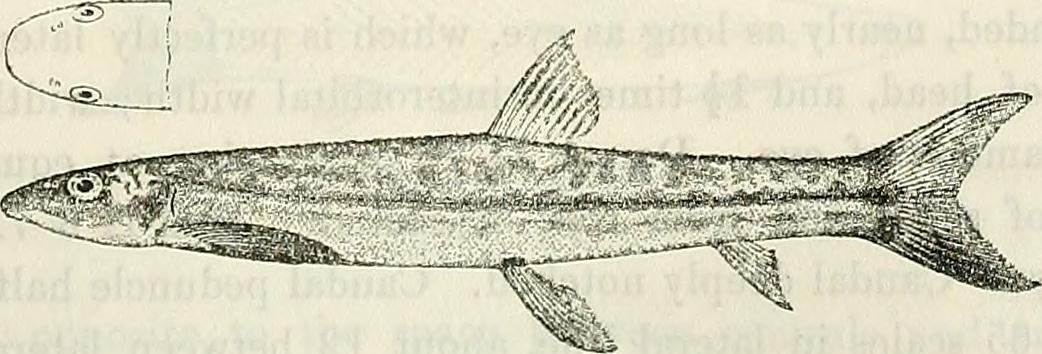

Conservation status
- Least Concern (IUCN 3.1)

Scientific classification
- Domain: Eukaryota
- Kingdom: Animalia
- Phylum: Chordata
- Class: Actinopterygii
- Order: Gonorynchiformes
- Family: Kneriidae
- Genus: Parakneria
- Species: P. cameronensis

Binomial name
- Parakneria cameronensis (Boulenger, 1909)

Synonyms
- Kneria cameronensis Boulenger, 1909

= Parakneria cameronensis =

Species of fish

Parakneria cameronensis is a benthopelagic species of tropical fish. The species can grow up to 8.3 cm, and are commonly found in the Congo River. The fish has a projectile upper jaw and subterminal mouth. The species' common name is Cameroon shellear.
