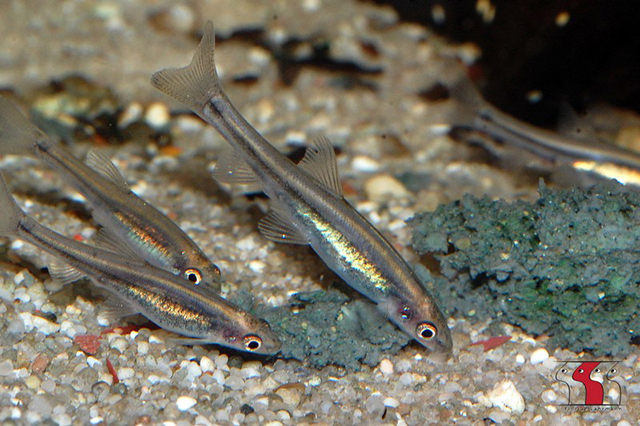

Conservation status
- Vulnerable (IUCN 3.1)

Scientific classification
- Kingdom: Animalia
- Phylum: Chordata
- Class: Actinopterygii
- Order: Gonorynchiformes
- Family: Kneriidae
- Genus: Kneria
- Species: K. uluguru

Binomial name
- Kneria uluguru Seegers, 1995

= Kneria uluguru =

Species of fish

Kneria uluguru is a species of fish in the family Kneriidae endemic to Tanzania. Its natural habitat is rivers.
