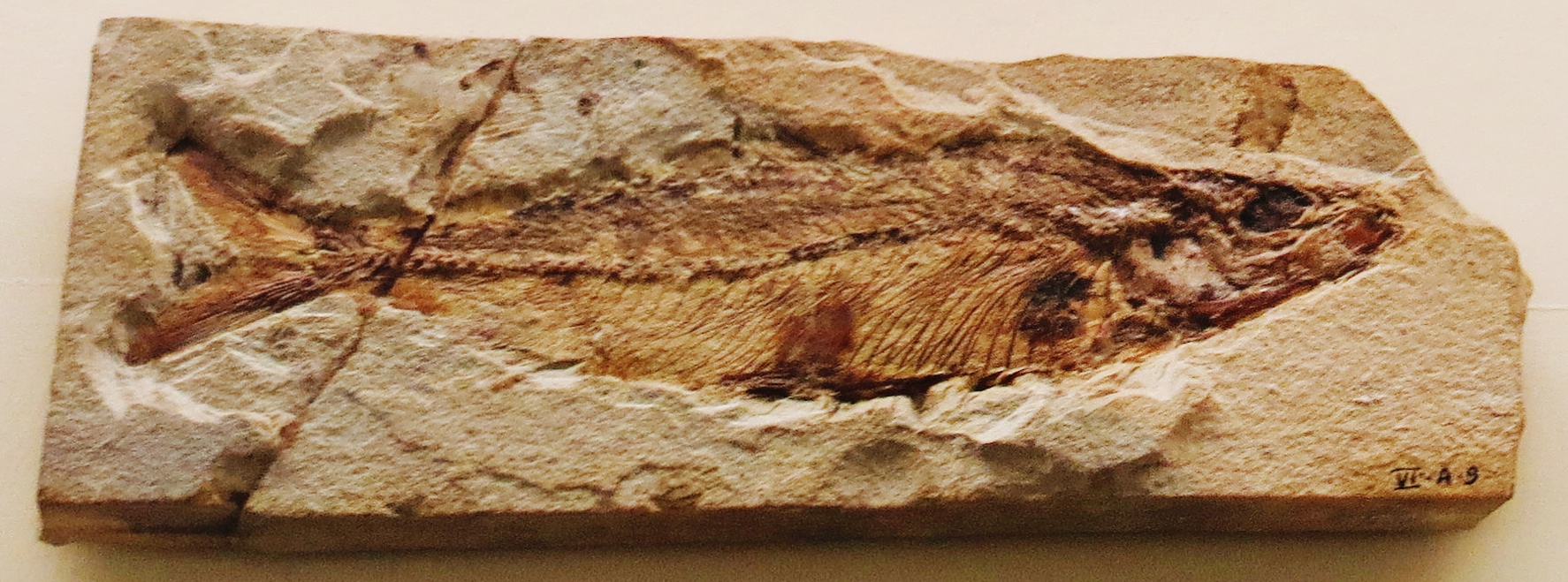
- Fossil specimen

Scientific classification
- Kingdom: Animalia
- Phylum: Chordata
- Class: Actinopterygii
- Order: Gonorynchiformes
- Family: Chanidae (?)
- Genus: †Coelogaster; Eastman, 1905
- Species: †C. leptostea

Binomial name
- †Coelogaster leptostea (Eastman, 1905)

Synonyms
- †Chanoides leptostea Eastman, 1905; †Coelogaster analis Eastman, 1905 ex Agassiz, 1835; †Eucoelogaster White & Moy-Thomas, 1940

= Coelogaster =

Coelogaster Temporal range: Early Eocene

Extinct genus of fishes

Coelogaster is an extinct genus of marine ray-finned fish that lived during the early Eocene. It contains a single species, C. leptostea, known from the famous Monte Bolca site of Italy.

It is classified in the Anotophysi, and is generally considered a chanid of uncertain affinities, making it related to modern milkfish.

It was initially named without formal description by Louis Agassiz in 1835 as Clupea leptostea, alongside another fish known as Coelogaster analis. In 1905, Eastman officially described C. analis based on Agassiz's original name, and also described Clupea leptostea under the new genus Chanoides. A later revision found both these taxa to be synonymous, leading to the new combination Coelogaster leptostea.

White & Moy-Thomas (1940) suggested the genus name Eucoelogaster as a replacement, as the previous genus name Coelogaster was already preoccupied by a weevil genus, but most authorities have since kept Coelogaster as the genus name, with the weevil genus instead going by Dietzella.
