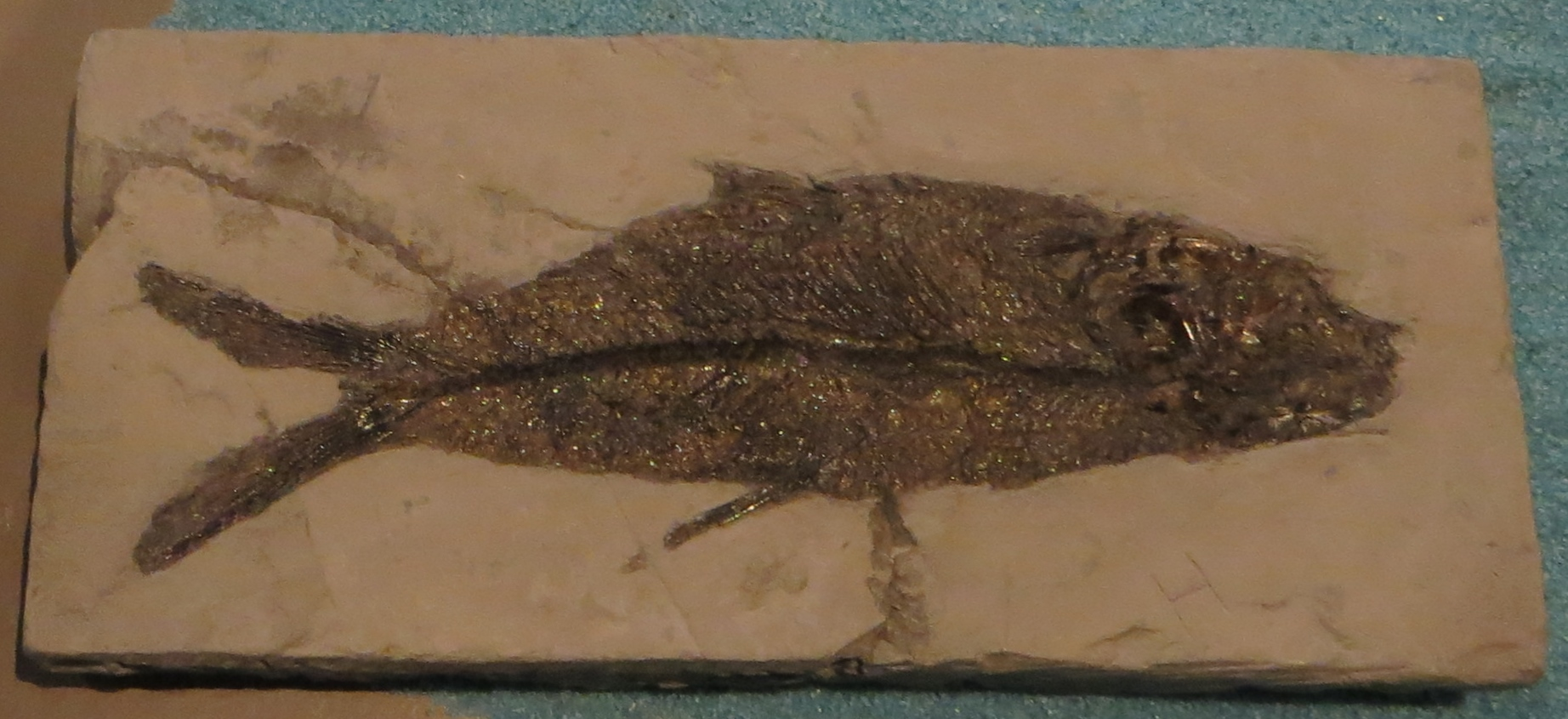
- Aethalionopsis robustus

Scientific classification
- Kingdom: Animalia
- Phylum: Chordata
- Class: Actinopterygii
- Division: Teleostei
- Order: Gonorynchiformes
- Family: Chanidae
- Subfamily: Chaninae
- Genus: †Aethalionopsis; Gaudant, 1966
- Species: †A. robustus

Binomial name
- †Aethalionopsis robustus (Traquair, 1911)

= Aethalionopsis =

Aethalionopsis Temporal range: Early Cretaceous

Extinct genus of fishes

Aethalionopsis is an extinct genus of prehistoric freshwater bony fish from the Early Cretaceous (Barremian to early Aptian, with possible earlier or later occurrences) of western Europe. Formerly classified as a species of the elopiform Anaethalion, it is now known to be a relative of the modern milkfish (Chanos) in order Gonorhynchiformes. It was previously placed as a basal member of the suborder Chanoidei, but is now more often placed as a basal member of the subfamily Chaninae of the family Chanidae, placing it closer to the extant Chanos.

Only a single species is presently accepted, A. robustus from the famous Iguanodon dinosaur locality of the Sainte-Barbe Clays Formation in Bernissart, Belgium. However, potential localities are also known from the Berriasian-Hauterivian of Sussex, England (classified in the genus Anaethalion as A. valdensis), and the Aptian-Albian of southern Italy (possibly an undescribed species). However, more recent studies have only accepted and commented on A. robustus, with no mention of these other occurrences.

== See also ==
- Prehistoric fish
- List of prehistoric bony fish
