= Parakneria tanzaniae =

Conservation status
- Vulnerable (IUCN 3.1)

Scientific classification
- Kingdom: Animalia
- Phylum: Chordata
- Class: Actinopterygii
- Order: Gonorynchiformes
- Family: Kneriidae
- Genus: Parakneria
- Species: P. tanzaniae

Binomial name
- Parakneria tanzaniae Poll, 1984

Species of fish

Parakneria tanzaniae is a species of fish in the family Kneriidae. It is endemic to Tanzania.
