= Kneria ruaha =

Conservation status
- Vulnerable (IUCN 3.1)

Scientific classification
- Kingdom: Animalia
- Phylum: Chordata
- Class: Actinopterygii
- Order: Gonorynchiformes
- Family: Kneriidae
- Genus: Kneria
- Species: K. ruaha

Binomial name
- Kneria ruaha Seegers, 1995

Species of fish

Kneria ruaha is a freshwater species of fish in the genus Kneria endemic to Tanzania. It naturally lives in rivers.
