= Caeus =

Caeus Temporal range: Early Albian

Scientific classification
- Kingdom: Animalia
- Phylum: Chordata
- Class: Actinopterygii
- Order: Gonorynchiformes
- Family: Chanidae
- Subfamily: Chaninae
- Genus: †Caeus; Costa, 1857
- Species: †C. leopoldi

Binomial name
- †Caeus leopoldi Costa, 1860

Synonyms
- Caesus (misspelling); Chanos leopoldi (Costa, 1860)

Extinct genus of fishes

Caeus is an extinct genus of prehistoric marine ray-finned fish, closely related to the modern milkfish. It contains a single species, C. leopoldi from the Early Cretaceous of the Pietraroja Plattenkalk, Italy. It is one of the largest teleosts known from the Pietraroja formation, and is known by only a single specimen.

It was first described as a genus without a species in 1857, before being officially described as a proper species in 1860. Some authorities have placed it as a species of the modern genus Chanos, but further studies have affirmed it as being a distinct genus. It is thought to be phylogenetically intermediate between Parachanos and Dastilbe.

== See also ==
- Prehistoric fish
- List of prehistoric bony fish
