= Kneria rukwaensis =

Conservation status
- Least Concern (IUCN 3.1)

Scientific classification
- Kingdom: Animalia
- Phylum: Chordata
- Class: Actinopterygii
- Order: Gonorynchiformes
- Family: Kneriidae
- Genus: Kneria
- Species: K. rukwaensis

Binomial name
- Kneria rukwaensis Seegers, 1995

Species of fish

Kneria rukwaensis is a species of fish in the family Kneriidae endemic to Tanzania. Its natural habitat is rivers.
