= Rubiesichthys =

Scientific classification
- Domain: Eukaryota
- Kingdom: Animalia
- Phylum: Chordata
- Class: Actinopterygii
- Order: Gonorynchiformes
- Family: Chanidae
- Subfamily: †Rubiesichthyinae
- Genus: †Rubiesichthys; Wenz, 1984

Extinct genus of fishes

Rubiesichthys is an extinct genus of prehistoric ray-finned fish.

== See also ==
- Prehistoric fish
- List of prehistoric bony fish
