= Anaethalion =

Anaethalion Temporal range: Kimmeridgian–Albian
- Anaethalion knorri

Scientific classification
- Kingdom: Animalia
- Phylum: Chordata
- Class: Actinopterygii
- Order: Elopiformes
- Genus: †Anaethalion; White, 1938

Species
- See text

Extinct genus of fishes

Anaethalion is an extinct genus of prehistoric marine and freshwater ray-finned fish related to modern tarpons and ladyfish. It is known from the Late Jurassic to the Early Cretaceous of Europe and northeasterrn Asia (Germany, Italy, the United Kingdom and Russia), roughly encompassing the Tethys Ocean.

It is the earliest known member of the Elopiformes and the Elopomorpha in general. The earliest known species are marine, but later species are found in freshwater habitats.

The following species are known:

- A. macrorhynchus (Eichwald, 1846) (Aptian of Siberia)
- A. knorri (Blainville, 1818) (Kimmeridgian of Germany)
- A. valdensis (Woodward, 1907) (Berriasian-Hauterivian of England)
- A. zapporum Arratia, 2000 (Kimmeridgian of Germany)

An undescribed species is known from the Albian of Italy. The genus Aethalionopsis was previously considered synonymous with Anaethalion, but is now known to be a fossil relative of the milkfish. Some authorities place some of its species (A. valdensis and the undescribed Italian species) with Aethalionopsis instead.

== See also ==
- Prehistoric fish
- List of prehistoric bony fish
