= Chromosome 4 open reading frame 54 =

Protein found in humans

C4orf54

Identifiers
- Aliases: C4orf54, uncharacterized LOC285556, FOPV, chromosome 4 open reading frame 54
- External IDs: OMIM: 617881; GeneCards: C4orf54

Gene location (Human)
Chr.	Chromosome 4 (human)
Band	4q23	Start	99,636,529 bp
Band	4q23	End	99,657,828 bp

Gene location (Mouse)
Chr.	Chromosome 3 (mouse)
Band	3 G3	Start	138,065,052 bp
Band	3 G3	End	138,081,506 bp
RNA expression pattern
Bgee	Human / Mouse (ortholog); Top expressed in: biceps brachii; vastus lateralis muscle; Skeletal muscle tissue of biceps brachii; deltoid muscle; Skeletal muscle tissue of rectus abdominis; tibialis anterior muscle; body of tongue; muscle of thigh; gastrocnemius muscle; right ventricle / Top expressed in: medial head of gastrocnemius muscle; knee joint; temporal muscle; ankle; soleus muscle; tibialis anterior muscle; triceps brachii muscle; vastus lateralis muscle; digastric muscle; sternocleidomastoid muscle; More reference expression data
BioGPS	n/a
Orthologs
Databases	NCBI: entry; OMA: entry
Species	Human	Mouse
Entrez	285556	102634333
Ensembl	ENSG00000248713	ENSMUSG00000090066
UniProt	D6RIA3	E0CYV9
RefSeq (mRNA)	NM_001354435	XM_006502554
RefSeq (protein)	NP_001341364	NP_001357791
Location (UCSC)	Chr 4: 99.64 – 99.66 Mb	Chr 3: 138.07 – 138.08 Mb
PubMed search
- Wikidata
View/Edit Human	View/Edit Mouse

Chromosome 4 open reading frame 54 is a protein that in humans is coded by the c4orf54 gene. This gene is also known as FOPV (Familial Obliterative Portal Venopathy) and LOC285556. This protein is mostly expressed in the nucleus of muscle cells. Orthologs are found in vertebrates but not invertebrates.

== Gene ==
Human chromosome 4 open reading frame 54(c4orf54) is made up of 10451 nucleotides from chromosome 4, map 4q23(chr4:99,636,529-99,657,828), on the complement strand. The mRNA of c4orf54(NM_001354435) is made up of 3 exons.

Location of C4orf54 on human chromosome 4

=== Gene Expression ===
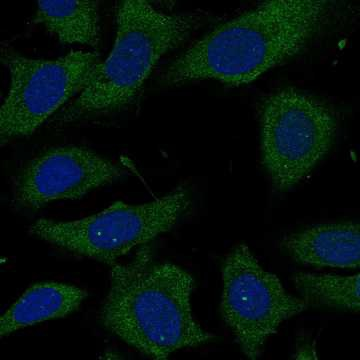
Human cells treated with c4orf54 rabbit antibodies. Green is target protein and blue is nucleus. Expression is intracellular, in the cytosol with pockets of concentrated expression in the nucleus.

Within cells, c4orf54 is primarily expressed in the nucleus with a. An analysis of unknown type of human cells treated with an antibody for c4orf54 showed that there is some expression in the nucleus but is primarily in the cytoplasm. C4orf54 is expressed in muscle cells such as biceps and bone, as well as some glands.

=== Regulation of expression ===
On the 5'UTR of the c4orf54 gene, there are several transcription factors that have to do with leucine zippers and they bind to the same 11 nucleotides: FOS, BATF::JUN, BATF3, and BATF.

=== Transcript ===
Exon 2 is the only exon transcribed. There is also the X1 variant of this gene. The 5' UTR is shorter than the main variant.

== Protein ==
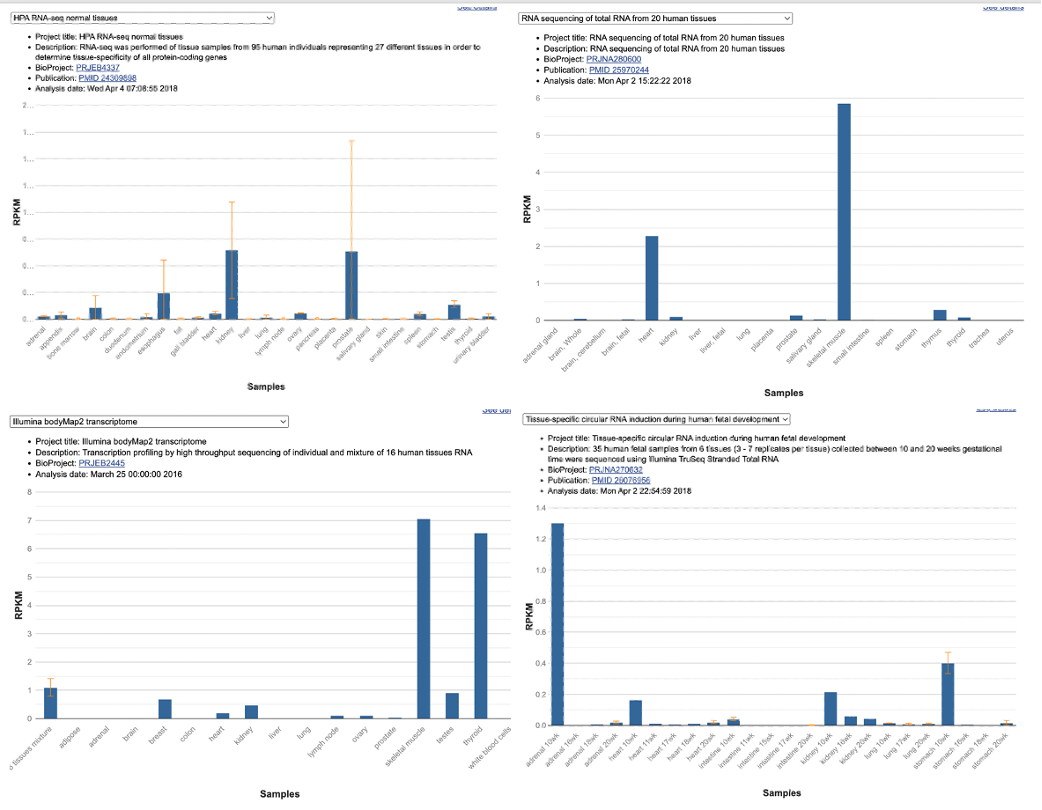
Expression from four datasets for the human c4orf54 gene from sequencing RNA. The highest RNA expression is from skeletal muscle from all four sets but the results vary.

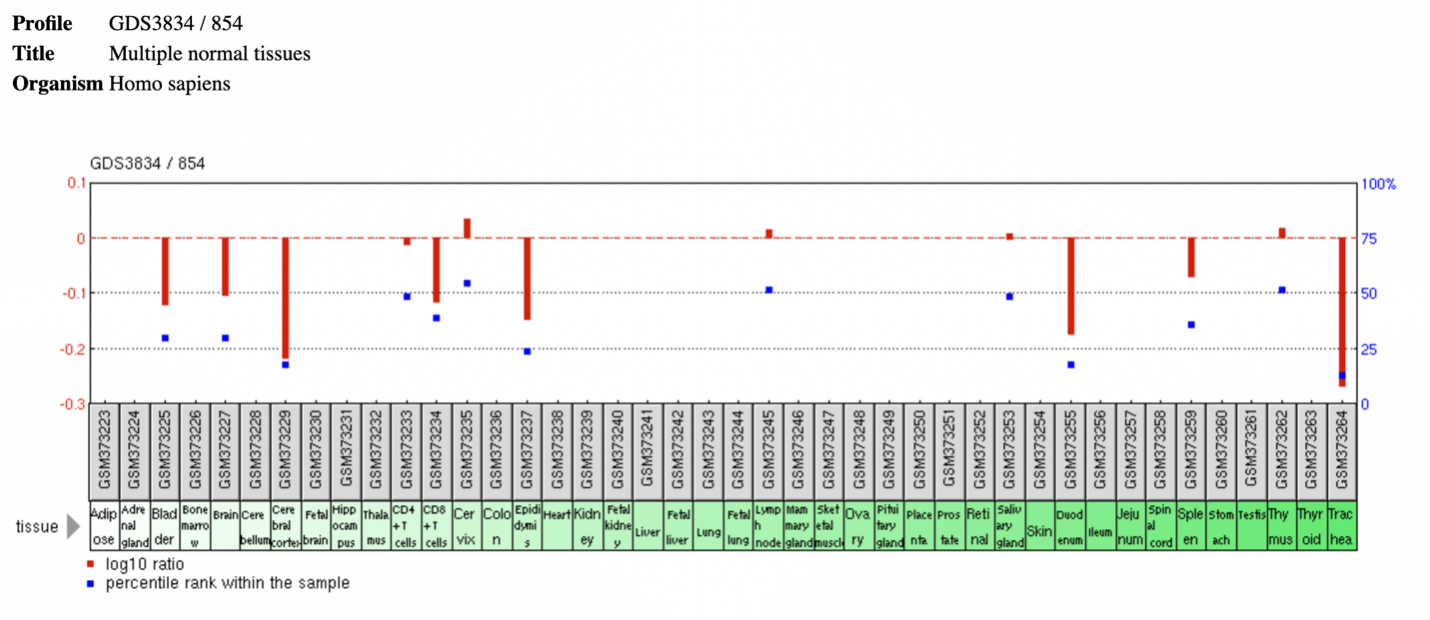
C4orf54 mRNA expression using microarray data on patients with normal tissues. The tissues with highest expression are from the cervix, lymph nodes, skin, and thyroid.

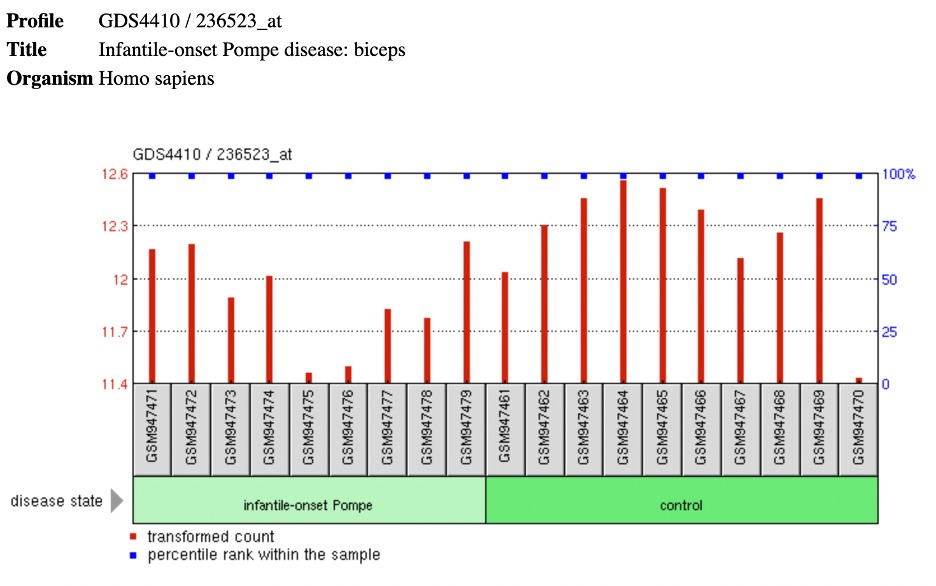
C4orf54 mRNA expression using microarray data on patient biceps with infantile-onset Pompe disease.The control samples have higher levels of expression than those with Pompe disease.

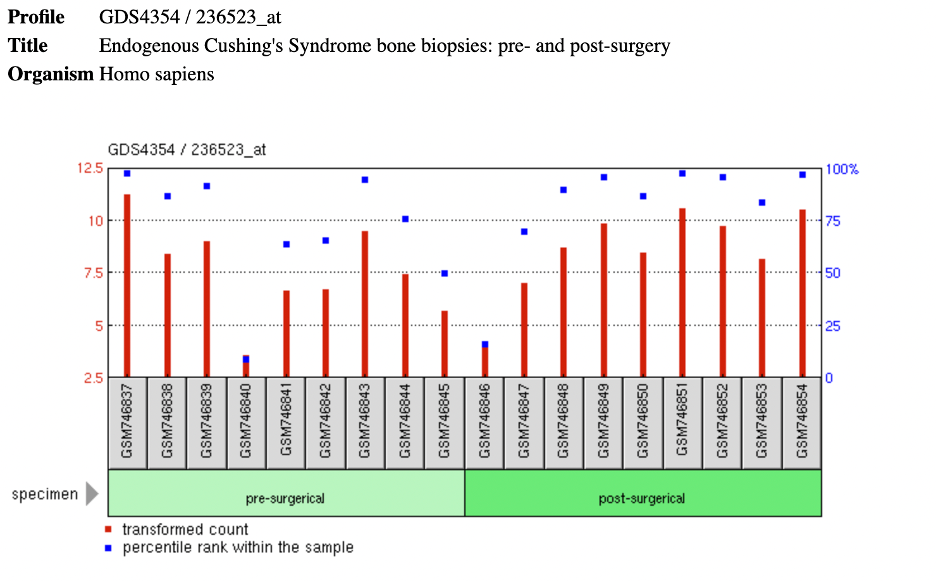
C4orf54 mRNA expression using microarray data on patient bone biopsies before and after surgery with Endogenous Cushing’s Syndrome. Expression is slightly increased overall post-surgery.

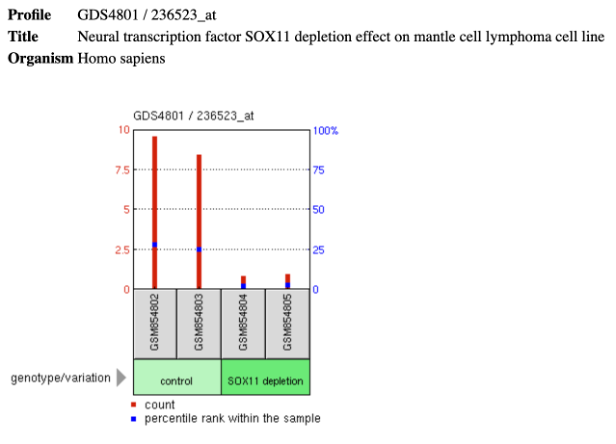
C4orf54 mRNA expression using microarray data on patients with SOX11 depletion. The control has significantly higher expression.

C4orf54 human protein is made up of 1793 amino acids. This unmodified form has a predicted molecular weight of approximately 190 kDal and a predicted isoelectric point of 9.11. This mass is concurrent with results from OMIM. The more enriched protein compared to other human proteins was serine(12.9%) and the pattern of serine then threonine was also highly enriched comparatively at 19.1%. This aligns with the results found from Motif Scan that the amino acid sequence is serine rich from amino acids 237 to 312. There is significant expression in smooth muscle tissue. There is a domain of unknown function.

=== Post-translational modifications ===
The c4orf54 protein is myristylated with over 20 predicted sites. There is also significant phosphorylation with 2 experimentally proven sites and over 50 predicted sites. One methylation site was found experimentally.

=== Structure ===
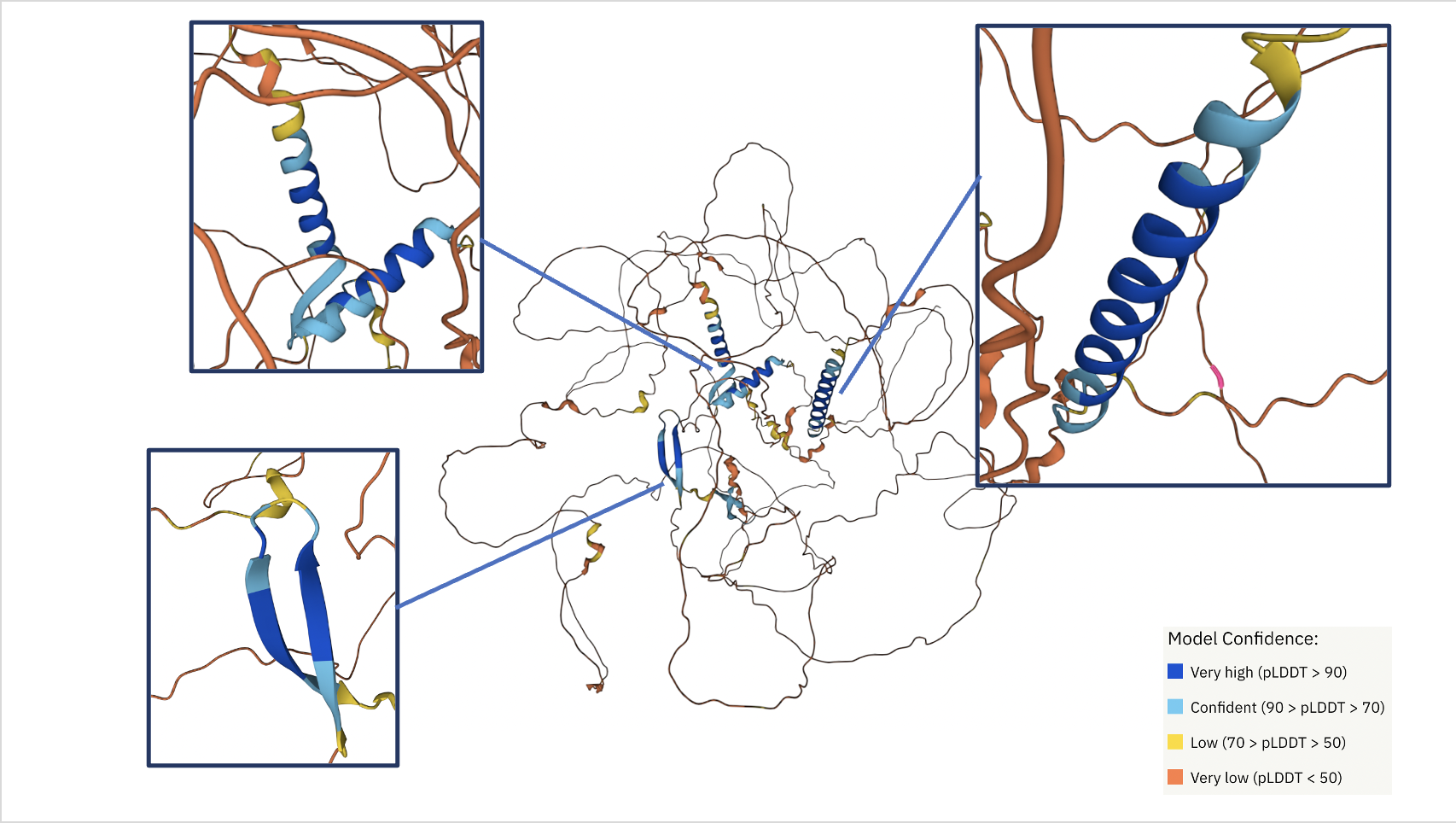
Alpha Fold Tertiary c4orf54 structure with high confidence zoomed in on. Color key for model confidence in lower right corner.

An analysis of the structure using Alpha Fold shows both alpha helices and beta sheets with 70% or more model confidence. The alpha helices have an overall higher model confidence.

=== Function ===
FOPV has been found to interact with 3 other proteins: BTF3, CUL4A, and KRAS. This protein may have lethal interactions with the Ras Oncogene. There may be an association between mutations in the FOPV gene and Obliterative portal venopathy which is lesions in portal vein branches in the liver.

== Orthologs ==
C4orf54 was found in vertebrates but not invertebrates. The most distant species found using NCBI BLAST with protein c4orf54 was Petromyzon marinus, the sea lamprey, which had the last common ancestor with humans around 600 million years ago with a sequence identity of 26.3%. This is also an estimate of when the c4orf54 gene emerged. The closest non primate relative is from about 87 million years ago with a sequence identity similarity to the human protein of 86.6%.

c4orf54	Genus and Species	Common Name	Taxonomic Group	Median Date of Divergence (MYA)	Accession #	Sequence Length (aa)	Query Cover (%)	Sequence Identity to Human Protein (%)	Sequence Similarity to Human Protein (%)	Corrected Divergence
Mammal	Homo sapiens	Human	Primates	0	NP_001341364.1	1793	100	100	100.0	0.00
Mammal	Mus musculus	House Mouse	Rodentia	87	NP_001357791.1	1786	96	86.94	86.6	14.25
Mammal	Neosciurus carolinensis	Eastern Grey Squirrel	Rodentia	87	XP_047423506.1	1786	100	86.72	90.8	14.25
Mammal	Felis catus	House Cat	Carnivora	94	XP_006931007.1	1801	100	84.71	89.8	16.59
Reptilia	Trachemys scripta elegans	Red-eared Slider	Testudines	319	XP_034627307.1	1670	79	51.47	57.9	66.42
Reptilia	Terrapene carolina triunguis	Three-toed Box Turtle	Testudines	319	XP_024067528.1	1553	79	51.58	54.8	66.20
Reptilia	Pantherophis guttatus	Corn Snake	Squamata	319	XP_034298051.1	1505	66	51.45	49.1	66.46
Reptilia	Chelonia mydas	Green Sea Turtle	Testudines	319	XP_037752386.1	1553	79	51.10	54.4	67.14
Aves	Catharus ustulatus	Swainson's Thrush	Passeriformes	319	XP_032915906.1	1472	79	47.05	51.4	75.40
Aves	Calypte anna	Anna's hummingbird	Apodiformes	319	XP_030306184.1	1540	79	46.95	51.7	75.61
Aves	Gallus gallus	Red Junglefowl	Galliformes	319	XP_040527126.1	1296	62	46.35	46.5	76.89
Amphibian	Xenopus tropicalis	Western Clawed Frog	Anura	353	XP_004911157.2	1521	74	42.92	48.0	84.58
Amphibian	Rana temporaria	Common Frog	Ranidae	353	XP_040184421.1	1501	79	38.75	43.0	94.80
Amphibian	Geotrypetes seraphini	Gaboon Caecilian	Gymnophiona	353	XP_033813063.1	1303	58	38.15	43.0	96.36
Fish	Chanos chanos	Milkfish	Gonorynchiformes	431	XP_030635043.1	1571	74	37.92	44.0	96.97
Fish	Megalops cyprinoides	Oxeye Herring	Elopiformes	431	XP_036406656.1	1612	79	37.82	45.1	97.23
Fish	Melanotaenia boesemani	Boeseman's Rainbowfish	Atheriniformes	431	XP_041840397.1	1505	73	35.83	43.1	102.64
Fish	Chiloscyllium plagiosum	Whitespotted Bamboo Shark	Orectolobiformes	464	XP_043530392.1	1237	52	48.25	37.3	72.88
Fish	Carcharodon carcharias	Great White Shark	Lamniformes	464	XP_041050558.1	1414	56	34.15	37.6	107.44
Fish	Petromyzon marinus	Sea Lamprey	Petromyzontiformes	599	XP_032825160.1	1482	27	31.20	26.3	116.48

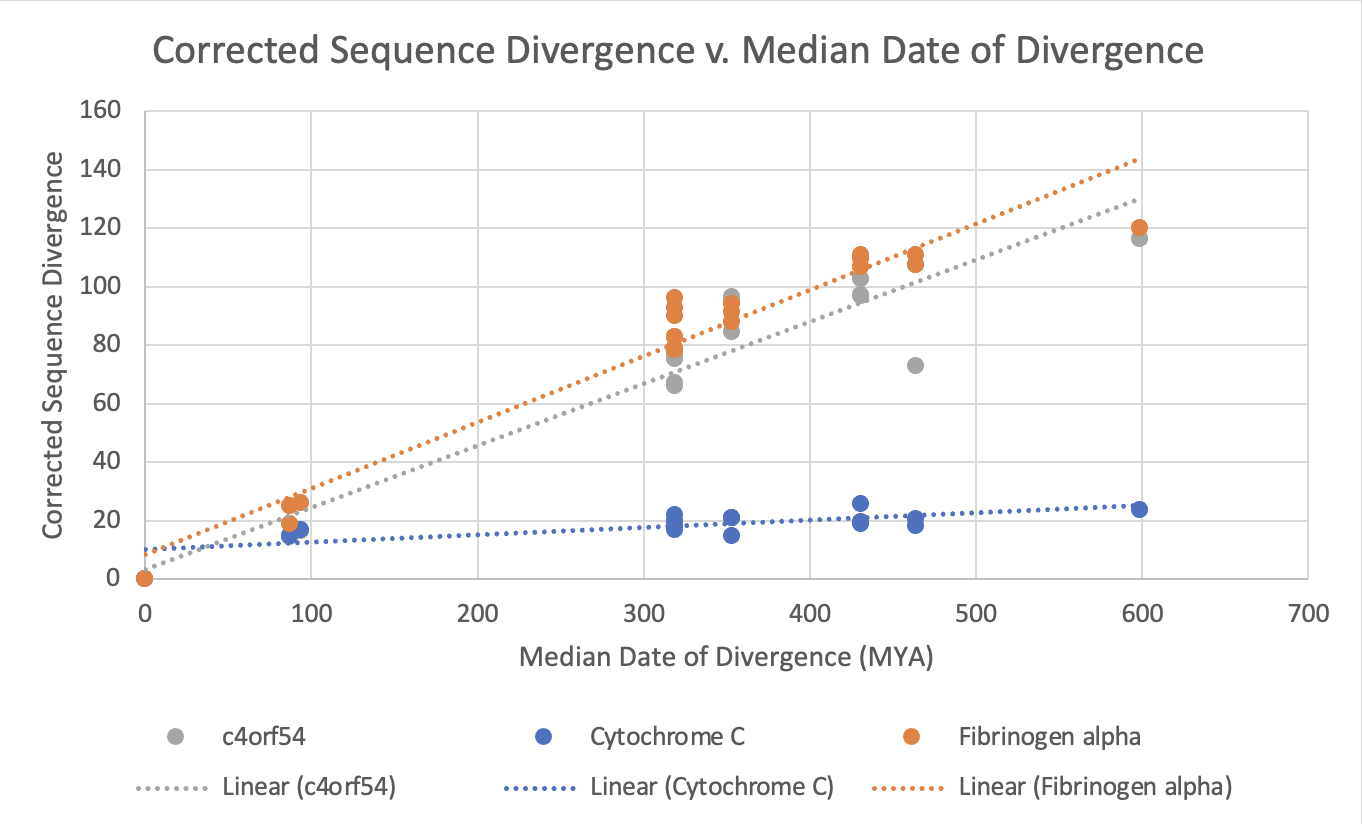
Corrected Sequence Divergence v. Median Date of Divergence of c4orf54 orthologs.
