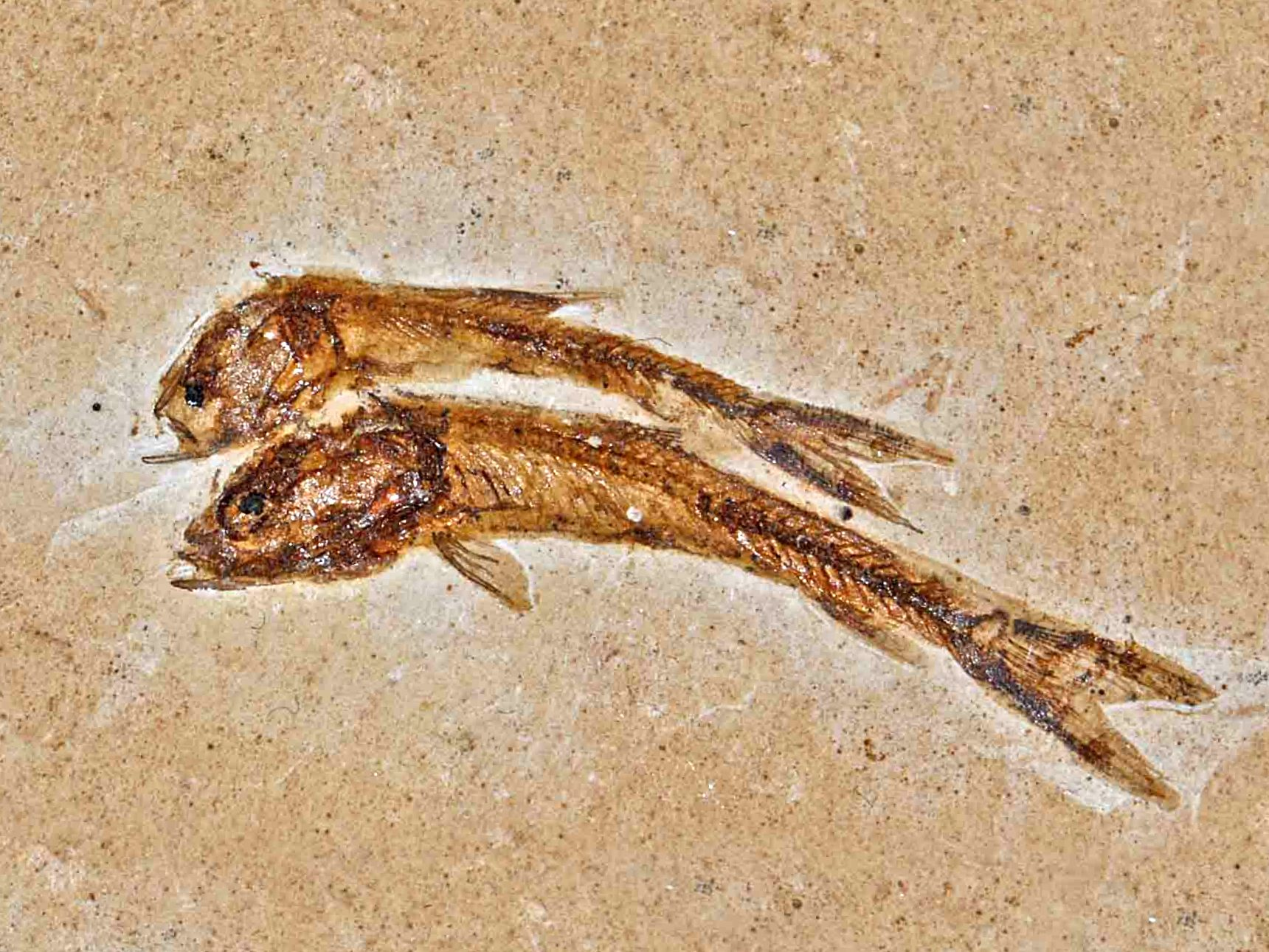
- D. crandalli fossil from Brazil

Scientific classification
- Kingdom: Animalia
- Phylum: Chordata
- Class: Actinopterygii
- Order: Gonorynchiformes
- Family: Chanidae
- Subfamily: Chaninae
- Genus: †Dastilbe; Jordan, 1910
- Species: †D. crandalli

Binomial name
- †Dastilbe crandalli Jordan, 1910

Synonyms
- ?†D. elongatus Santos, 1947

= Dastilbe =

Dastilbe Temporal range: Early Cretaceous (Aptian) ~115–113 Ma

Extinct genus of fishes

Dastilbe is an extinct genus of prehistoric marine & freshwater ray-finned fish from the Early Cretaceous of Brazil. It was a relative of modern milkfish.

== Taxonomy ==
Only one definitive species is known, D. crandalli Jordan, 1910 from the Aptian of the Muribeca Formation (Sergipe-Alagoas Basin) and the Crato Formation, where it is an abundant fossil fish. The species D. elongatus Silvas Santos, 1947 from the Parnaíba Basin (Codó Formation) is sometimes considered its own species, but is now generally considered synonymous with D. crandalli. Other studies have found extensive morphological variation within D. crandalli, and have suggested that it may represent a species complex. Potential undescribed species are also known from the Maceió Formation of the Alagoas Basin, and at levels of the Muribeca Formation younger than the levels that D. crandalli was found in.

Several other chanid taxa have previously been assigned to Dastilbe or have even been considered conspecific with D. crandalli, but are now considered distinct genera and species. The species 'D. minor' Santos, 1975 from the Aptian-aged Marizal Formation of Bahia, was assigned to Dastilbe as a nomen nudum, but was revived and reclassified into its own genus (Nanaichthys) in 2012. The species D. moraesi Santos, 1955 from the Barremian/Aptian of Minas Gerais, Brazil (Areado Formation) was placed in its own genus, Francischanos, in 2022. D. batai Gayet, 1989 from the Aptian/Albian of Equatorial Guinea, and the only species known outside of Brazil, was reclassified into Parachanos in 2007.

== Description ==
Dastilbe could reach a length of 25–60 millimetres (0.98–2.36 in), with a maximum length of about 150 millimetres (5.9 in). It was probably an anadromous fish, tolerant of hypersalinity and subjected to frequent mass mortality. Larger individuals of this predatory fish fed on small fishes and probably they were also cannibalistic.

== See also ==
- Prehistoric fish
- List of prehistoric bony fish
