= Grasseichthys =

Conservation status
- Vulnerable (IUCN 3.1)

Scientific classification
- Kingdom: Animalia
- Phylum: Chordata
- Class: Actinopterygii
- Division: Teleostei
- Order: Gonorynchiformes
- Family: Kneriidae
- Genus: Grasseichthys; Géry, 1964
- Species: G. gabonensis

Binomial name
- Grasseichthys gabonensis Géry, 1964

Genus of fishes

Grasseichthys gabonensis is an extremely small (around 2 cm) fish native to the Ivindo and Central Congo basins of Africa. It is the only member of its genus.
