= Sate bandeng =

Indonesian grilled milkfish dish

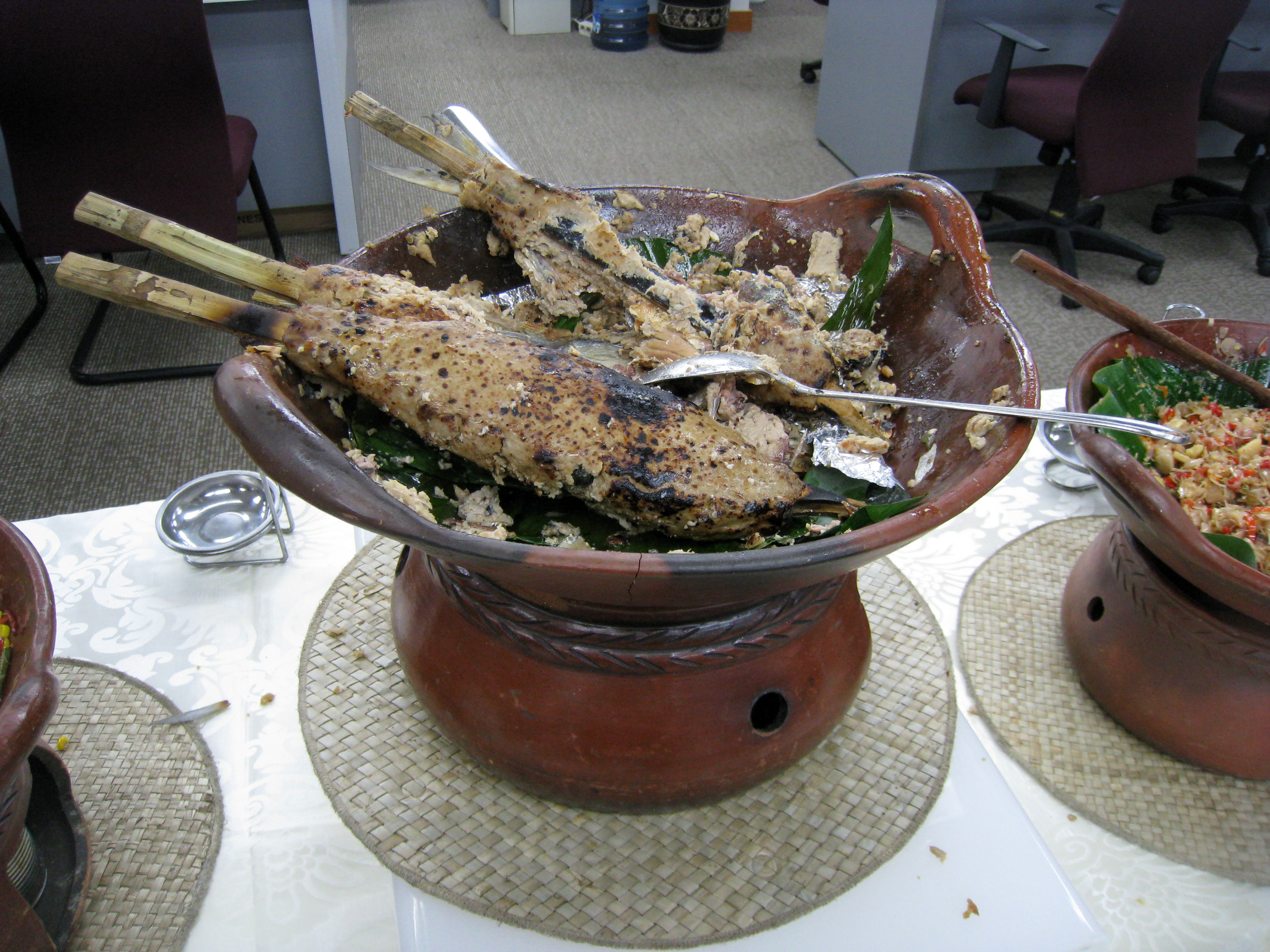
- Sate bandeng served in a prasmanan
- Course: Main course
- Place of origin: Indonesia
- Region or state: Banten
- Created by: Bantenese
- Serving temperature: Hot or room temperature
- Main ingredients: Milkfish, deboned and spiced, stuck in large bamboo skewer and grilled

Sate Bandeng is a popular Sundanese traditional cuisine from Banten, a province near Jakarta, Indonesia. Sate Bandeng is made of deboned milkfish (Chanos chanos; Indonesian: ikan Bandeng) grilled in its skin on bamboo skewers over charcoal embers.

== See also ==
- Satay
- Cakalang fufu
- Pindang
- Asam pedas
