= Parakneria =

Scientific classification
- Domain: Eukaryota
- Kingdom: Animalia
- Phylum: Chordata
- Class: Actinopterygii
- Clade: Anotophysi
- Order: Gonorynchiformes
- Family: Kneriidae
- Genus: Parakneria; Poll, 1965

Type species
- Parakneria damasi Poll 1965

Species
- see text

Genus of fishes

Parakneria is a genus of fish in the family Kneriidae, with 15 species, all of which are restricted to Africa.

== Species ==
There are 15 species:

- Parakneria abbreviata (Pellegrin, 1931)
- Parakneria alytogrammus Kiwele Mutambala, Abwe, Schedel, Manda, Schliewen & Vreven, 2022
- Parakneria cameronensis (Boulenger, 1909)
- Parakneria damasi Poll, 1965
- Parakneria fortuita M. J. Penrith, 1973 (Cubango kneria)
- Parakneria kissi Poll, 1969
- Parakneria ladigesi Poll, 1967
- Parakneria lufirae Poll, 1965
- Parakneria malaissei Poll, 1969
- Parakneria marmorata (Norman, 1923)
- Parakneria mossambica R. A. Jubb & Bell-Cross, 1974 (Gorongoza kneria)
- Parakneria spekii (Günther, 1868)
- Parakneria tanzaniae Poll, 1984
- Parakneria thysi Poll, 1965
- Parakneria vilhenae Poll, 1965
