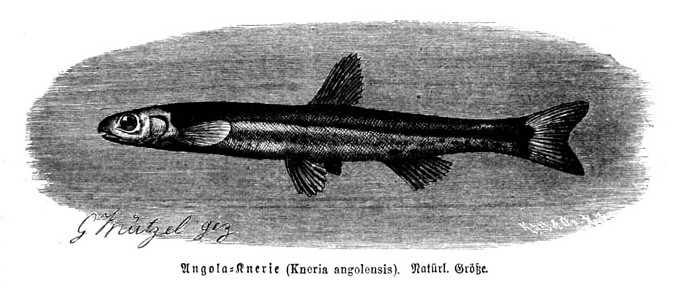

Scientific classification
- Kingdom: Animalia
- Phylum: Chordata
- Class: Actinopterygii
- Clade: Anotophysi
- Order: Gonorynchiformes
- Family: Kneriidae
- Genus: Kneria; Steindachner, 1866

Type species
- Kneria angolensis Steindachner, 1866

Synonyms
- Angola Myers, 1928; Xenopomichthys Pellegrin, 1905

= Kneria =

Genus of fishes

Kneria is a genus of small fish in the family Kneriidae. All the species in this genus are restricted to Africa.

Named in honor of Austrian ichthyologist Rudolf Kner (1810-1869)

== Species ==
The following species are included in this genus:

- Kneria angolensis Steindachner, 1866
- Kneria ansorgii (Boulenger, 1910)
- Kneria auriculata (Pellegrin, 1905) (Airbreathing shellear)
- Kneria katangae Poll, 1976
- Kneria luansaensis Kalumba, Abwe, Schedel, Manda, Schliewen & Vreven, 2023
- Kneria maydelli Ladiges & Voelker, 1961 (Cunene kneria)
- Kneria maxi Kalumba, Abwe, Schedel, Manda, Schliewen & Vreven, 2023
- Kneria paucisquamata Poll & D. J. Stewart, 1975
- Kneria polli Trewavas, 1936 (Western shellear)
- Kneria ruaha Seegers, 1995
- Kneria rukwaensis Seegers, 1995
- Kneria sjolandersi Poll, 1967
- Kneria stappersii Boulenger, 1915
- Kneria uluguru Seegers, 1995
- Kneria wittei Poll, 1944

In addition to this list, however, there is another possible species known: 'Southern Kneria (Kneria sp. 'South Africa'), occurring only in the headwaters of a few tributaries of the Crocodile River, in the Inkomati River system of South Africa. It was initially declared a Critically Endangered species on the IUCN Red List in 2007, but it was reassessed in 30 November 2016 as Endangered.
