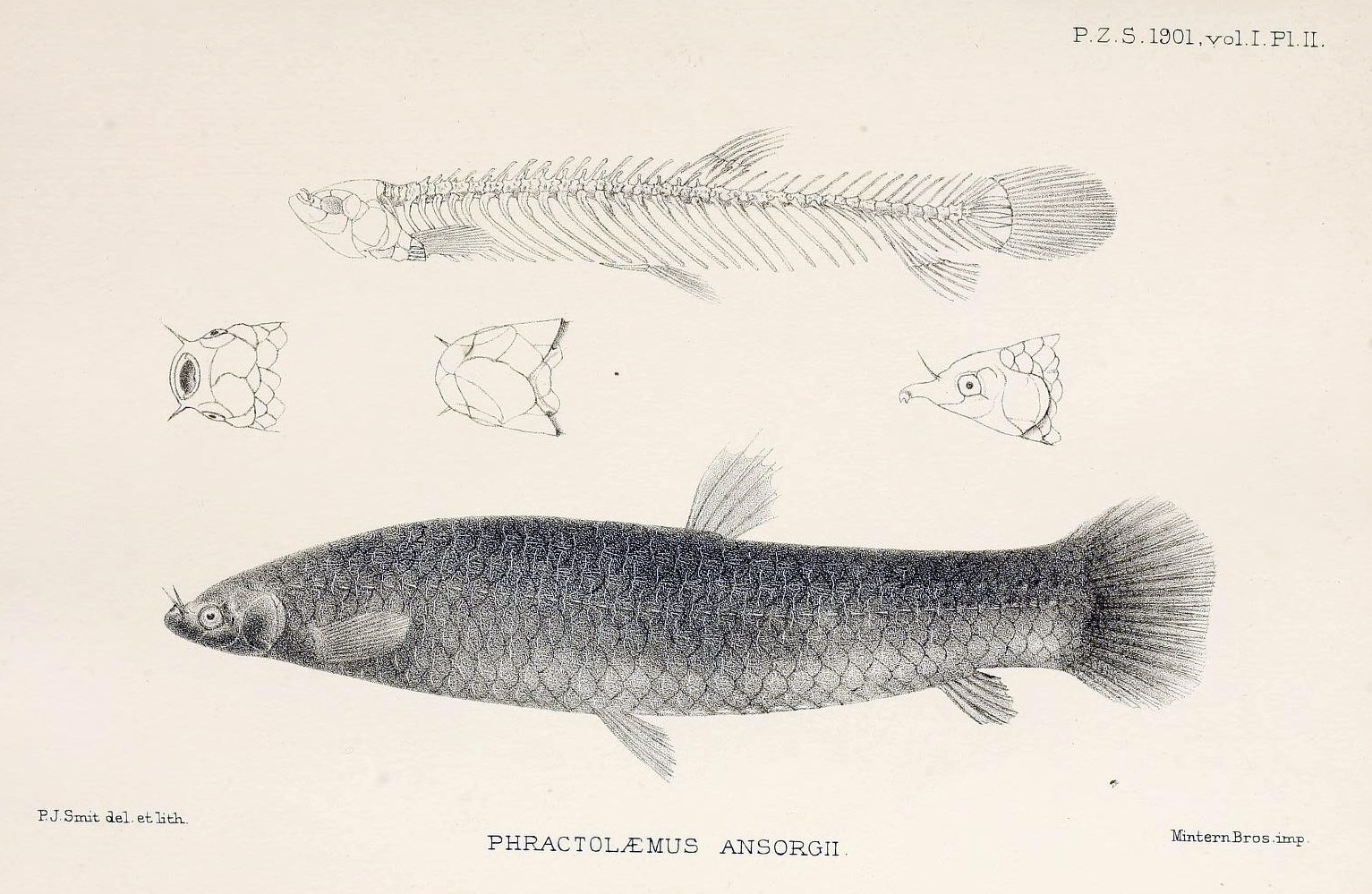

Conservation status
- Least Concern (IUCN 3.1)

Scientific classification
- Kingdom: Animalia
- Phylum: Chordata
- Class: Actinopterygii
- Order: Gonorynchiformes
- Family: Phractolaemidae; Boulenger, 1901
- Genus: Phractolaemus; Boulenger, 1901
- Species: P. ansorgii

Binomial name
- Phractolaemus ansorgii Boulenger, 1901

Synonyms
- Phractolaemus spinosus Pellegrin, 1925

= Hingemouth =

Species of ray-finned fish

The hingemouth (Phractolaemus ansorgii) is a freshwater fish found only in western Central Africa. It is less commonly known as the “African Mudminnow”, “African mudfish”, “snake mudfish”, and “snake mudhead”. In Lontomba, it is called "mobili". It is best known for its unique oral anatomy.

== Species description ==
The hingemouth is a small, olive-gray or brown fish with an elongated, semi-cylindrical body measuring up to 18 cm.

Its namesake mouth points upwards, although this is a bit of a simplification, given its unique jaw anatomy. Unlike in most bony fishes, where the dentary bones comprise the front tip of the lower jaw with the articulation point farther back, the hingemouth’s jaw is jointed between the dentary and quadrate bones at the anterior tip of the head. When its mouth is closed, the dentary and attached upper jaws (the maxillae and premaxillae) lay back against the quadrate. When the mouth opens, the dentary swings upwards and outwards, projecting the upper jaws forward. Protrusion of the premaxilla is a trait of teleost fishes in general, and many teleost taxa have developed variations of the anatomy that enables protrusion, but the hingemouth’s jaw anatomy and method of premaxillary protrusion have not been observed in any other fishes.

The mouth itself, which resembles a proboscis, is not formed entirely around the skeletal jaws. The proboscis is composed of two fleshy “lips” made of cartilage and connective tissue. The upper jaws project into the sides of the upper lip; the lower lip has no skeletal support. When the hingemouth’s jaw is closed, the edges of the lips sit partly-open at the top of the head, with the rest of the mouth tissues tucked inside the head and fatty “chin”. When the jaw opens, premaxillary protrusion extends the entire proboscis forward, reaching as far as 30% of the hingemouth’s head length. The proboscis is extended, retracted, and otherwise manipulated through a complex arrangement of tendons, ligaments, cartilage, and muscles, including highly-modified adductor mandibulae.

Although the hingemouth lacks pharyngeal teeth, it does have a small “tooth” on each dentary bone; these are actually projections of the dentaries themselves. The proboscis is also lined with rows of keratinous projections.

The rest of the head is bony, with large, overlapping interopercular bones covering the throat. The hingemouth has one barbel and two narial tubes. Its small eyes are positioned on the sides of the head. Its gill openings are narrow.

The hingemouth’s pectoral fins are small, rounded, and low on the body. Its homocercal tail has a rounded fan shape. Its dorsal, anal, and pelvic fins are all pointed. The pelvic fins sit at the midpoint of the body, and the dorsal fin sits midway between the pelvic and anal fins. All its fins are generally colorless, although the unpaired fins may have a red tint on the edges.

Its scales are cycloid. Male hingemouth have sharp, prominent tubercles on some of their scales and rays, likely used in conflicts with other males and to maintain contact during reproduction. Female hingemouth also have tubercles on some scales and fins, although they are less-developed and likely used only for reproduction. In both sexes, the tubercles are well-vascularized with keratin caps.

== Systematics ==
The hingemouth is currently considered the sole member of the family Phractolaemidae. Bayesian analysis of mitochondrial DNA sequences has placed the hingemouth and its sister clade Kneriidae (another endemic freshwater African family) in the order Gonorynchiformes. Although no fossils directly related to the hingemouth have been found as of yet, the first kneriid fossil was discovered in 2002; comparisons of the fossil against modern hingemouth and kneriid specimens led some researchers to argue that the hingemouth should be subsumed into Kneriidae.

== Distribution ==
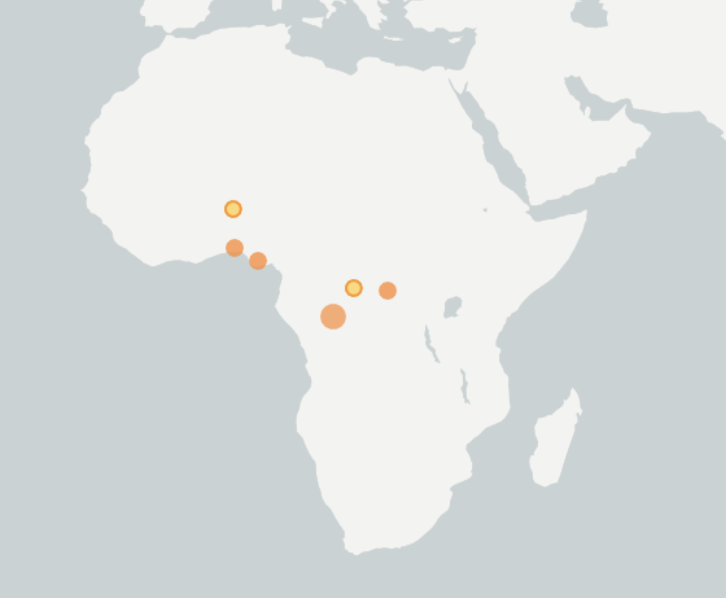
Recorded occurrences of the hingemouth (Phractolaemus ansorgii)

Hingemouth are found in freshwater swamps and slow-moving waters of the Congo and Niger River systems east of the Dahomey Gap. In the dry season, they can be found in the benthos of floodplain pools and lagoons.

In a survey of the upper Ekole River in Nigeria that used local fishers to collect samples over several months, hingemouth comprised 0.77% of the catch. The study authors considered hingemouth relatively abundant, though not dominant, among the 70 different species observed. In another study, carried out in flooded forest swamps near Lake Tumba in the Democratic Republic of Congo, hingemouth represented 4.55% of the fish sampled. Their distribution across the Lake Tumba micro-basin was higher in areas with deeper, slower, warmer waters. Hingemouth also preferred areas with less plant debris on the bottom.

== Biology ==
The hingemouth is a facultative air-breather, supported in low-oxygen environments by a swim bladder that can function as a lung due to its alveoli, as well as the ability to project its mouth above the surface. This enables the hingemouth to survive in the warm, slow-moving, poorly-oxygenated swamps and floodplains it inhabits.

It feeds primarily on organic detritus and phytoplankton, as well as other small benthic organisms. Like many teleost fishes, the hingemouth uses premaxillary protrusion to increase efficiency in suction-feeding and striking at food, but its unique jaws also allow fine motor control similar to an elephant's trunk or the lips of mammals. This ability to probe, scrape, pinch, and otherwise extract small food particles with its mouth makes the hingemouth uniquely effective as a bottom-feeder, especially in waters with uneven substrates.

Little information is available on the non-feeding behavior of hingemouths, although they are suspected to be fairly solitary. However, as a member of the superorder Ostariophysi, the hingemouth likely produces and responds to Schreckstoff. This is a chemical released when Ostariophysan fish are injured, serving as an alarm signal to nearby conspecifics. Because this trait is only useful in a species with some level of sociality, the hingemouth may be more social than suspected. Alternatively, it may have lost the trait, or never developed it at all (although the latter is unlikely, given its evolutionary relationship to the other Ostariophysi).

Like other gonorynchiform fishes, hingemouths are oviparous and reproduce via external fertilization. Their lifespan, growth rates, and life cycle are also poorly-described.

== Conservation status ==
Although the IUCN considers the hingemouth a species of least concern, it does experience anthropogenic threats, both directly via fishing and trade, and indirectly via damage to its habitat. For example, the upper Ekole River, where hingemouth are found in abundance, is subject to regular oil spills and other anthropogenic pollution. Similarly, the swampy forests near Lake Tumba are threatened by slash-and-burn agriculture and commercial deforestation, as well as pollution by humans. Hingemouth from the Anambra River system in Nigeria–another regularly-polluted river–bioaccumulate as much copper in their bodies as pollutes the sediment they feed from, and 1.6 times as much as the water they swim in.

Hingemouth populations may be disproportionately impacted by damage to their habitats because of their extensively-modified jaw anatomy, which could represent an evolutionary “dead end”. Anatomical modification alone does not keep a species from adapting to new circumstances–for example, the famously-diverse cichlids have a broad range of very specialized mouths, which has likely contributed to their success as a family. However, the hingemouth’s jaws are relatively inflexible compared to other specialized fish jaws. This may explain why the hingemouth is so isolated, phylogenetically speaking, when compared to fish like cichlids. If this is the case, the hingemouth will likely struggle to adapt to habitat changes over time.

Although there are no formal records of hingemouth fisheries available in English, personal and commercial fishing does occur. The hingemouth is used ethnomedically by Ifa practitioners in Southwest Nigeria as both an antidote to malicious poisoning and a treatment for erectile dysfunction. Practitioners source the hingemouth from fish traders, fishermen, traditional doctors and pharmacists, and even catch the fish themselves. The hingemouth may be caught for food as well; at the time of Western discovery, the hingemouth was already being consumed by locals. Given that it is still caught by local fishers and distributed by fish traders for ethnomedical use, it seems likely that it is also being fished for dietary purposes to some extent.

Outside its native range, the hingemouth is occasionally sold for fishkeeping in aquaria, although hobbyists report that it is not a commonly-kept species and that information on its care is difficult to find.
