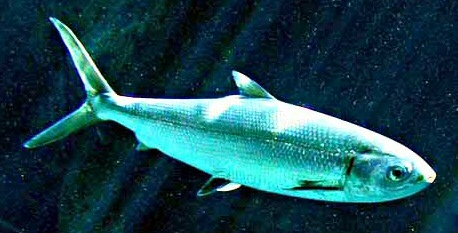
- Chanos chanos
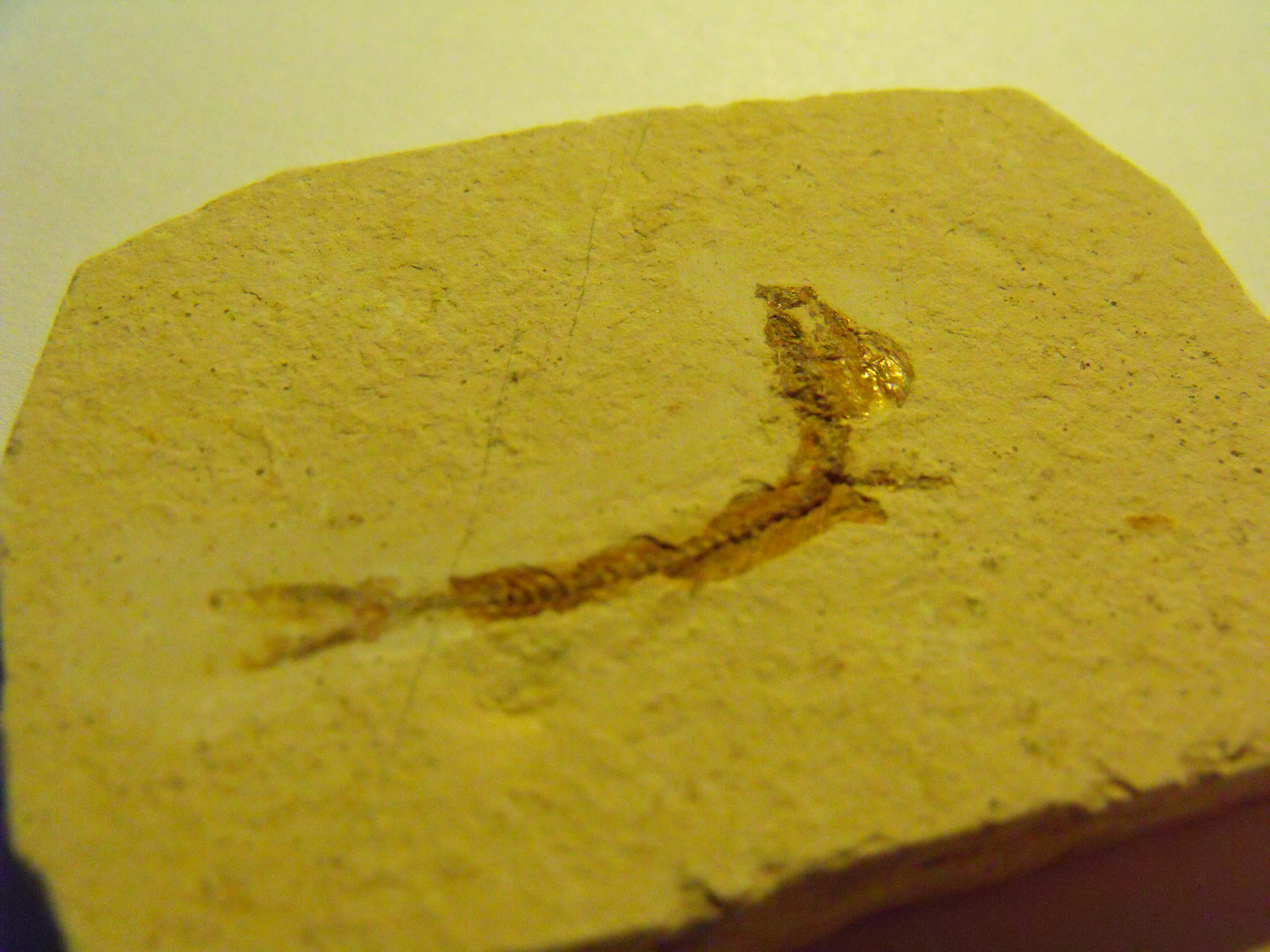
- 110 million year old fossil †Dastilbe from Brazil

Scientific classification
- Kingdom: Animalia
- Phylum: Chordata
- Class: Actinopterygii
- Division: Teleostei
- Order: Gonorynchiformes
- Family: Chanidae; Günther, 1868

Type genus
- Chanos Lacépède, 1803

Subfamilies
- †Rubiesichthyinae; Chaninae

= Chanidae =

Chanidae Temporal range: Berriasian–present

Family of fishes

Chanidae is a family of fishes which has a number of fossil genera and one monotypic extant genus which contains the milkfish (Chanos chanos).

== Taxonomy ==
The family Chanidae is subdivided into two subfamilies, Rubiesichthyinae and Chaninae.

- †Cabindachanos Taverne et al. 2019 - Paleocene
- ?†Coelogaster Eastman, 1905 [Coelogaster Agassiz 1835 nomen nudum; Coelogaster Eastman 1905 non Schrank 1780 non Schoenherr 1837 non Schultze 1896; Ptericephalina Lioy 1866; †Eucoelogaster White & Moy-Thomas 1940] - Early Eocene
- Subfamily †Rubiesichthyinae Poyata-Ariza 1996
  - Genus †Gordichthys Poyata-Ariza 1994 - Early Cretaceous
  - Genus †Nanaichthys Amaral & Brito 2012
  - Genus †Rubiesichthys Wenz 1984 - Early Cretaceous
- Subfamily Chaninae
  - Genus †Aethalionopsis Gaudant 1966 - Early Cretaceous
  - Genus †Caeus Costa 1860 - Early Cretaceous
  - Genus Chanos Lacépède 1803 - Eocene to present
  - Genus †Dastilbe D. S. Jordan 1910 - Early Cretaceous
  - Genus †Francischanos Ribeiro et al. 2022 - Early Cretaceous
  - Genus †Parachanos Arambourg & Schneegans 1935 - Early Cretaceous
  - Genus †Prochanos Bassani, 1882 - Late Cretaceous
  - Genus †Tharrhias D. S. Jordan & Branner 1908 - Early Cretaceous
  - Genus †Vango Murray et al. 2023 - Late Cretaceous
