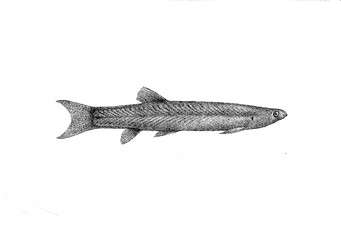
- Cromeria nilotica

Scientific classification
- Domain: Eukaryota
- Kingdom: Animalia
- Phylum: Chordata
- Class: Actinopterygii
- Clade: Anotophysi
- Order: Gonorynchiformes
- Family: Kneriidae
- Genus: Cromeria; Boulenger, 1901

Type species
- Cromeria nilotica Boulenger, 1901

Species
- 2 recognized species, see article.

= Cromeria =

Genus of fishes

Cromeria is a small genus of fish in the family Kneriidae found in fresh waters in the Sudan, Mali, and Guinea in the Nile and Niger Rivers of Africa. These reach a length of up to 4.4 cm. The currently recognized species are:

- Cromeria nilotica Boulenger, 1901 (naked shellear)
- Cromeria occidentalis Daget, 1954
