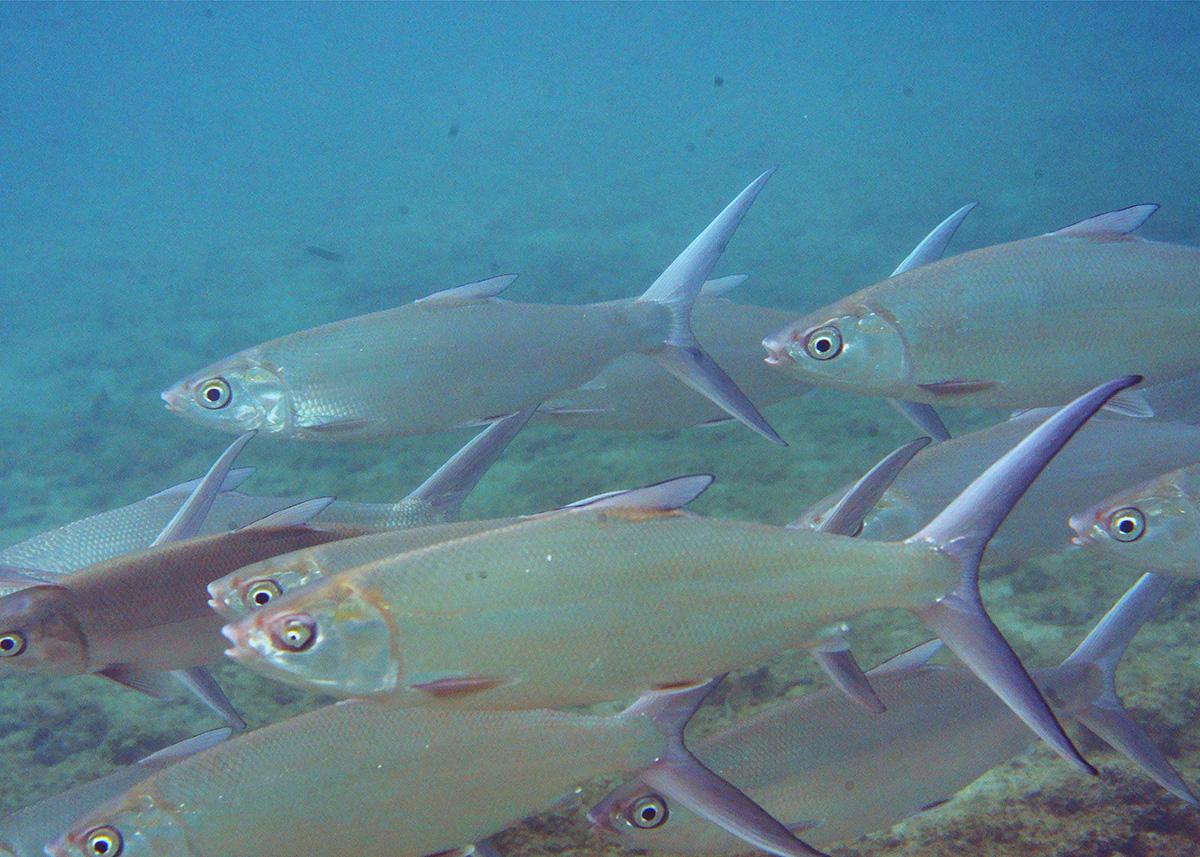
- La Réunion
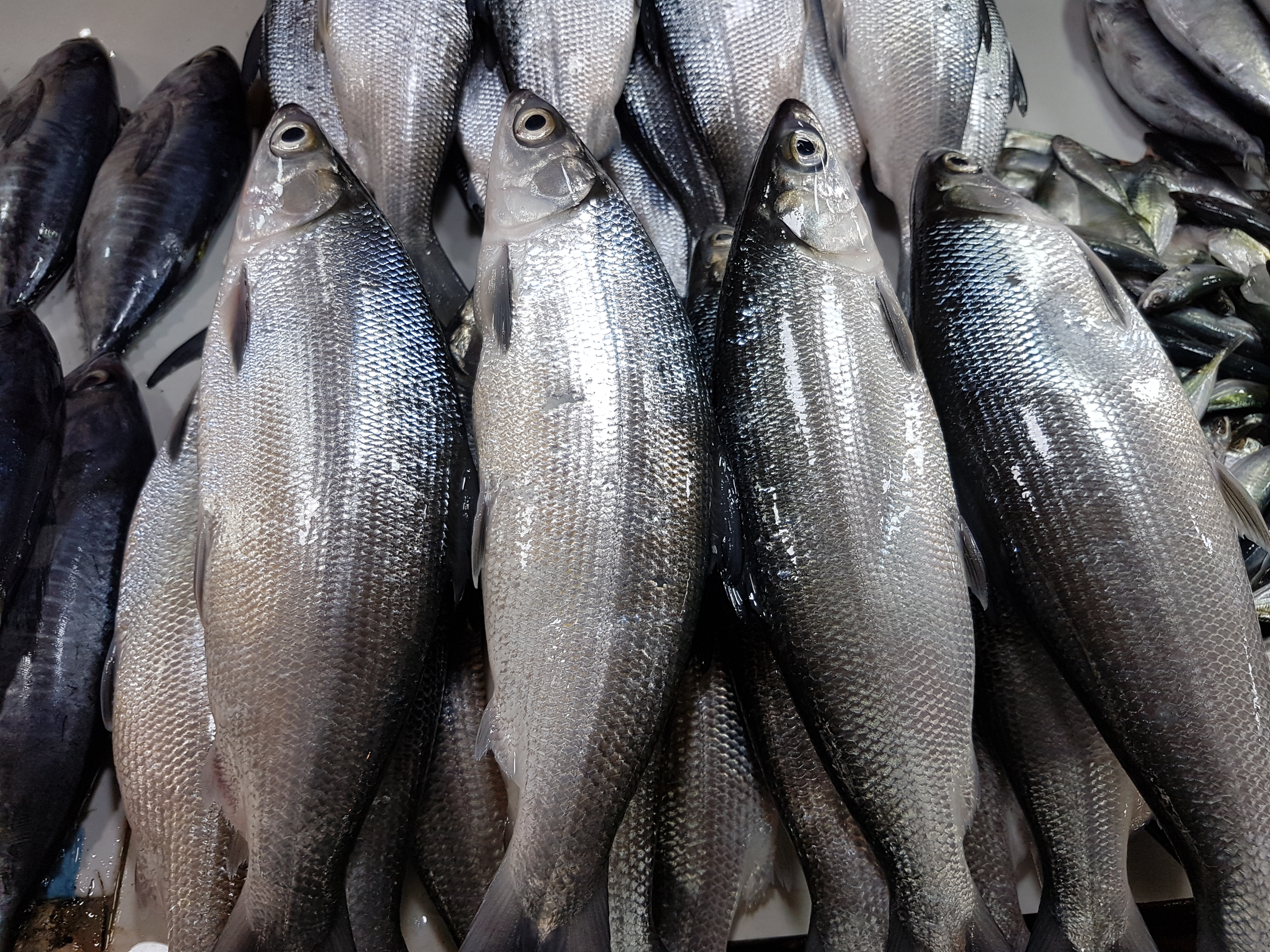
- Milkfish (locally bangús) in a Philippine fish market

Conservation status
- Least Concern (IUCN 3.1)

Scientific classification
- Kingdom: Animalia
- Phylum: Chordata
- Class: Actinopterygii
- Division: Teleostei
- Order: Gonorynchiformes
- Family: Chanidae
- Subfamily: Chaninae
- Genus: Chanos; Lacépède, 1803
- Species: C. chanos

Binomial name
- Chanos chanos (Forsskål, 1775)

Synonyms
- List: Butirinus argenteus Jerdon, 1849; Butirinus maderaspatensis Jerdon, 1849; Chanos arabicus Lacépède, 1803; Chanos chloropterus Valenciennes, 1847; Chanos cyprinella Valenciennes, 1847; Chanos gardineri Regan, 1902; Chanos indicus (van Hasselt, 1823); Chanos lubina Valenciennes, 1847; Chanos mento Valenciennes, 1847; Chanos mossambicus (Peters, 1852); Chanos nuchalis Valenciennes, 1847; Chanos orientalis Valenciennes, 1847; Chanos salmoneus (Forster, 1801); Chanos salmonoides Günther, 1879; Cyprinus pala Cuvier, 1829; Cyprinus palah (Cuvier, 1829); Cyprinus tolo Cuvier, 1829; Leuciscus palah Cuvier, 1829; Leuciscus salmoneus (Forster, 1801); Leuciscus zeylonicus Bennett, 1833; Lutodeira chanos (Forsskål, 1775); Lutodeira chloropterus (Valenciennes, 1847); Lutodeira indica van Hasselt, 1823; Lutodeira mossambica Peters, 1852; Lutodeira mossambicus Peters, 1852; Lutodeira salmonea (Forster, 1801); Mugil chanos Forsskål, 1775; Mugil salmoneus Forster, 1801

= Milkfish =

Milkfish Temporal range: 63–0 Ma Early Paleocene–present

Species of fish

The milkfish (Chanos chanos) is a widespread species of ray-finned fish found throughout the Indo-Pacific. It is the sole living species in the family Chanidae, and the only living member of the genus Chanos. The repeating scientific name (tautonym) is from Greek khanos (χάνος 'mouth'). They are grouped in the order Gonorhynchiformes and are most closely related to the Ostariophysi—freshwater fishes such as carps, catfish, and loaches.

The species has many common names. The Hawaiian name for the fish is awa, and in Tahitian it is ava. It is called bangús (Tagalog: [bɐˈŋus]) in the Philippines, where it is popularly known as the national fish, although the National Commission for Culture and the Arts has stated that this is not the case as it has no basis in Philippine law. In the Nauruan language, it is referred to as ibiya. Milkfish is also called bandeng or bolu in Indonesia.

== Geographic distribution ==
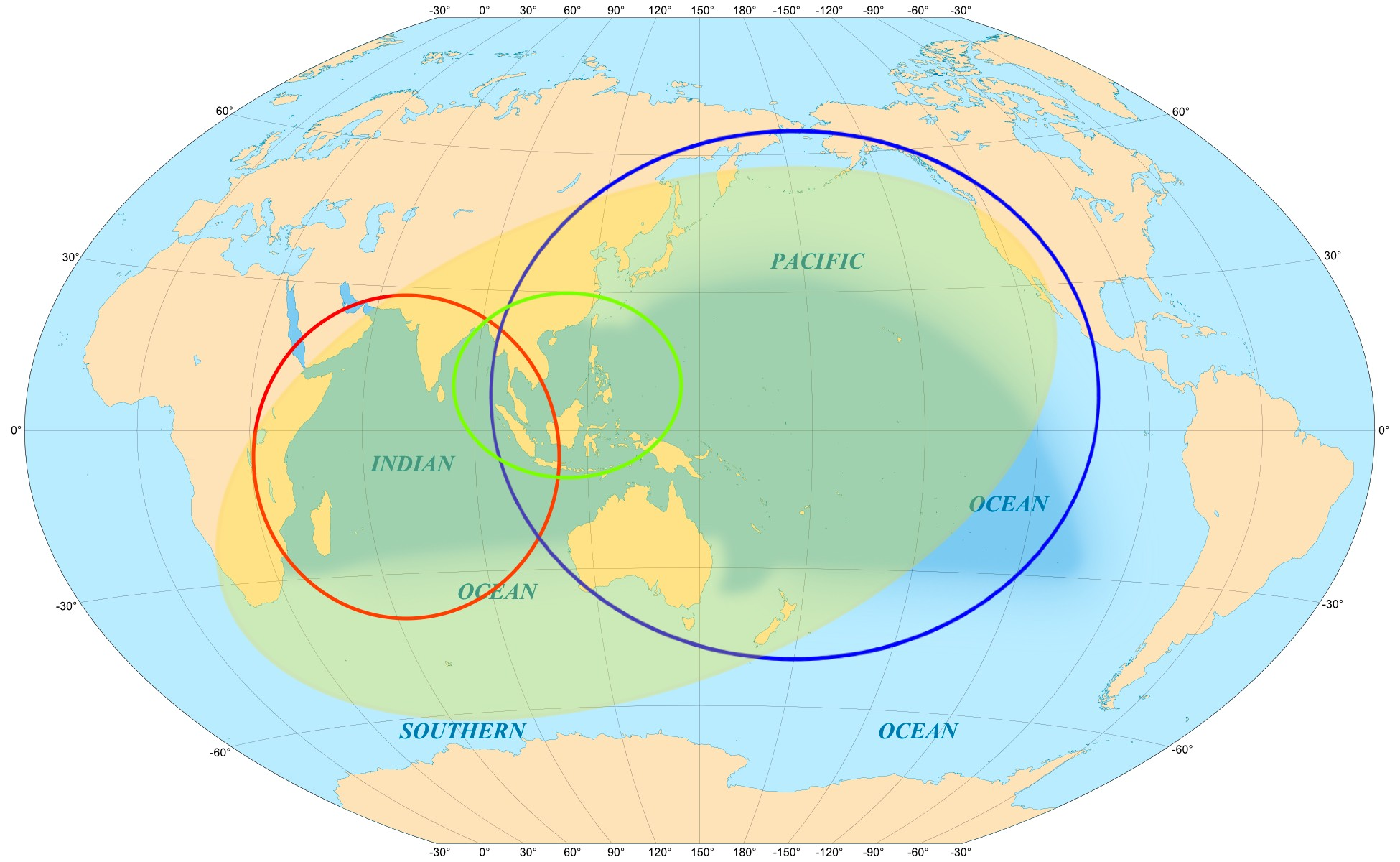
Estimated geographical range of Chanos in the Indo-Pacific

Chanos chanos occurs in the Indian Ocean and across the Pacific Ocean, from South Africa to Hawaii and the Marquesas, from California to the Galapagos, north to Japan, south to Australia. A single specimen was reported in 2012 in the eastern Mediterranean Sea. In 1877, the California Fish and Game Commission introduced 100 milkfish from Hawaii to the inland waters of Solano County, California. The introduced population could not establish itself permanently and it is currently unknown how their presence affected the native ecosystem.

Milkfishes commonly live in tropical offshore marine waters around islands and along continental shelves, at depths of 1 to 30 m (3 ft 3 in to 98 ft 5 in). They also frequently enter estuaries and rivers.

== Taxonomy ==
Chanos is the only surviving genus of the ancient family Chanidae, which has existed since the Early Cretaceous. The only surviving species is the widespread C. chanos. The genus Chanos originated in North America, with the oldest known fossil species dating as far back as the earliest Paleocene around 63 million years ago in Mexico. The earliest fossil Chanos were found in freshwater Eocene deposits in Europe and North America—hinting that the species first appeared in freshwater environments 40–50 million years ago. It is possible that their invasion into the ocean happened during high sea-level or flooding events after the Eocene. Global cooling during the Mid-Eocene likely wiped out the population of milkfish in the Atlantic, but the species persisted in the Indo-Pacific.

The following fossil species of Chanos are known:

- †C. brevis (Heckel, 1854) – Oligocene of the Chiavon Limestone, Italy
- †C. chautus Guadarrama & Cantalice, 2025 – Danian of the Tenejapa-Lacandón Formation, Mexico
- †C. compressus Stinton, 1977 [otolith] – Late Ypresian of the Wittering Formation, England
- †C. forcipatus Kner & Steindachner, 1863 – Late Ypresian of Monte Bolca, Italy
- †C. torosus Daniltshenko, 1968 – Earliest Ypresian of the Danata Formation, Turkmenistan
- †C. zignoi Kner & Steindachner, 1863 – Oligocene of the Chiavon Limestone, Italy

The extinct Caeus leopoldi from the Early Cretaceous (Albian) of Italy is also sometimes placed in Chanos as Chanos leopoldi, which would be the earliest record of the genus and extend its occurrence even further back. However, more recent studies have affirmed it being a distinct genus.

== Anatomy ==
Milkfish

The milkfish can grow to 1.80 m (5 ft 11 in), but are most often no more than 1 m (39 in) in length. They can reach a weight of about 19 kg (42 lb) in pond. and an age of 15 years. They have an elongated and almost compressed body, with a generally symmetrical and streamlined appearance, one dorsal fin, falcate pectoral fins and a sizable forked caudal fin. The head is small relative to the body. The mouth is small and toothless. The body is olive green, with silvery flanks and dark bordered fins. They have 13–17 dorsal soft rays, 8–10 anal soft rays and 31 caudal fin rays. There are numerous fine intramuscular bones, which may complicate human consumption of the fish (see "Consumption" below).

Their silvery complexion is similar to many other fish species of the Indo-Pacific. They are often mistaken for species of Clupeidae, Megalops cyprinoides, Gonorhynchus gonorhynchus, and Elops machnata. Chanos can be distinguished from these species by their size, absence of scutes, tubercle on the lower jaw, fin placement, no gular plate between arms of the lower jaw, and having only four branchiostegal rays.

Variant milkfish body types have occasionally been found. The "goldfish-type" milkfish was discovered in the Philippines and is characterized by distinctly elongated dorsal, pelvic, and anal fins, and a caudal fin as long as the body. In Hawaii, Indonesia, and Australia, dwarf or hunchback 'shad-type' specimens have been recorded. They have a standard length-to-depth ratio of 2.0–2.5 instead of the usual 3.5–4.0. In Northern Australia, a milkfish with a red head, red fins, and blue dorsal coloration was reported.

== Life history ==
Reproduction of milkfish in nature is far less understood than populations of milkfish bred and propagated in captivity (see "Aquaculture" below). In the wild, milkfish take 3–5 years to mature. Females can produce 0.5–6 million eggs and have the ability to spawn more than once a year. Spawning takes place at night, may be lunar periodic, and is strongly seasonal. Milkfish eggs are pelagic and range between 1.1 and 1.25 mm (0.043 and 0.049 in) in diameter. Spawning sites are clear, warm, shallow waters above sand or coral reefs. It is believed milkfish prefer these locations to minimize predation from benthic planktivores.

Milkfish larvae have a pelagic planktonic stage. Younger larvae occur mostly at the surface, or sometimes deeper (20–30 m (66–98 ft)). Older larvae are only found at the surface and in near-shore environments. Larvae metamorphose into fry and become benthic-feeding juveniles that are opportunistically herbivorous, detritivorous, or omnivorous, depending on the predominant food types in the habitat.

Juvenile milkfish larger than 20 mm (0.79 in) typically bear the characteristics of adults. They have complete fin rays, a forked caudal fin, scales, and silvery coloration. Juveniles have been found to inhabit a diverse range of shallow-water ecosystems such as coral lagoons, estuaries, marsh flats, tidal creeks, and tide pools.

=== Diet ===
Milkfish are omnivorous opportunistic feeders. Juvenile milkfish eat a variety of foods including phytoplankton, zooplankton, filamentous green algae, and small invertebrates. Similarly to juveniles, adults also eat benthic invertebrates and additionally planktonic and nektonic items such as clupeid juveniles.

=== Habitat ===
Adults tend to school around coasts and islands with coral reefs. The young fry live at sea for two to three weeks and then migrate during the juvenile stage to mangrove swamps, estuaries, and sometimes lakes, and return to sea to mature sexually and reproduce. Juveniles prefer to settle in undisturbed coastal ecosystems that are semi-enclosed, calm, shallow, free from predators, and rich in aquatic vegetation. In their natural habitats, milkfish are very adaptable to both changes in environmental conditions and diet. Milkfish are good osmoregulators and extremely euryhaline.

The wide geographic distribution of milkfish has led to genetic variation in the species across the Indo-Pacific. Milkfish populations differ between the Hawaiian islands, the central Pacific islands, Tonga, Tahiti, Philippines-Taiwan-Indonesia, Thailand-Malaysia, India, and Africa. However, all populations are thought to be inter-breeding, thus they are all considered one species, and their genetic diversity is low. However, populations may still differ in their reproductive, migratory, and survival methods.

== Conservation status ==
According to the International Union for Conservation of Nature, as of 2019, milkfish were not a threatened species. However, little information is available on wild stocks.

Although milkfish populations are not threatened with extinction, they are at risk of ingesting or absorbing pollutants. Milkfish frequent environments that have been affected by industrial pollutants, land runoff, and plastics. Asia is one of the largest contributors of plastic litter into both the ocean and freshwater systems. A population of milkfish from San Jose, Northern Samar, Philippines, was found to have concentrations of lead in the meaty part of their bodies. Pollutants have also affected the aquaculture industry. In an aquaculture system in Butuan, Philippines, 97% of the fish sampled had microplastics in their gastrointestinal tracts. A similar study in Indonesia showed similar results. The presence of pollutants in milkfish poses a threat to the species' health, aquaculture, and humans.

== Fishing ==
In the Philippines, it is illegal to catch adult milkfish (sabalo) measuring over 60 cm (24 in). While the 1975 law was enacted in an effort to protect spawning stocks of fish, sabalo are still incidentally caught in fish corrals and are products of bycatch. This ban was reinforced by the Philippine Fisheries Code of 1998, which punishes violators with imprisonment for 6 months to 8 years, and/or a fine of ₱80,000, forfeiture of the catch and fishing equipment used, and revocation of their fishing license.

== Consumption ==
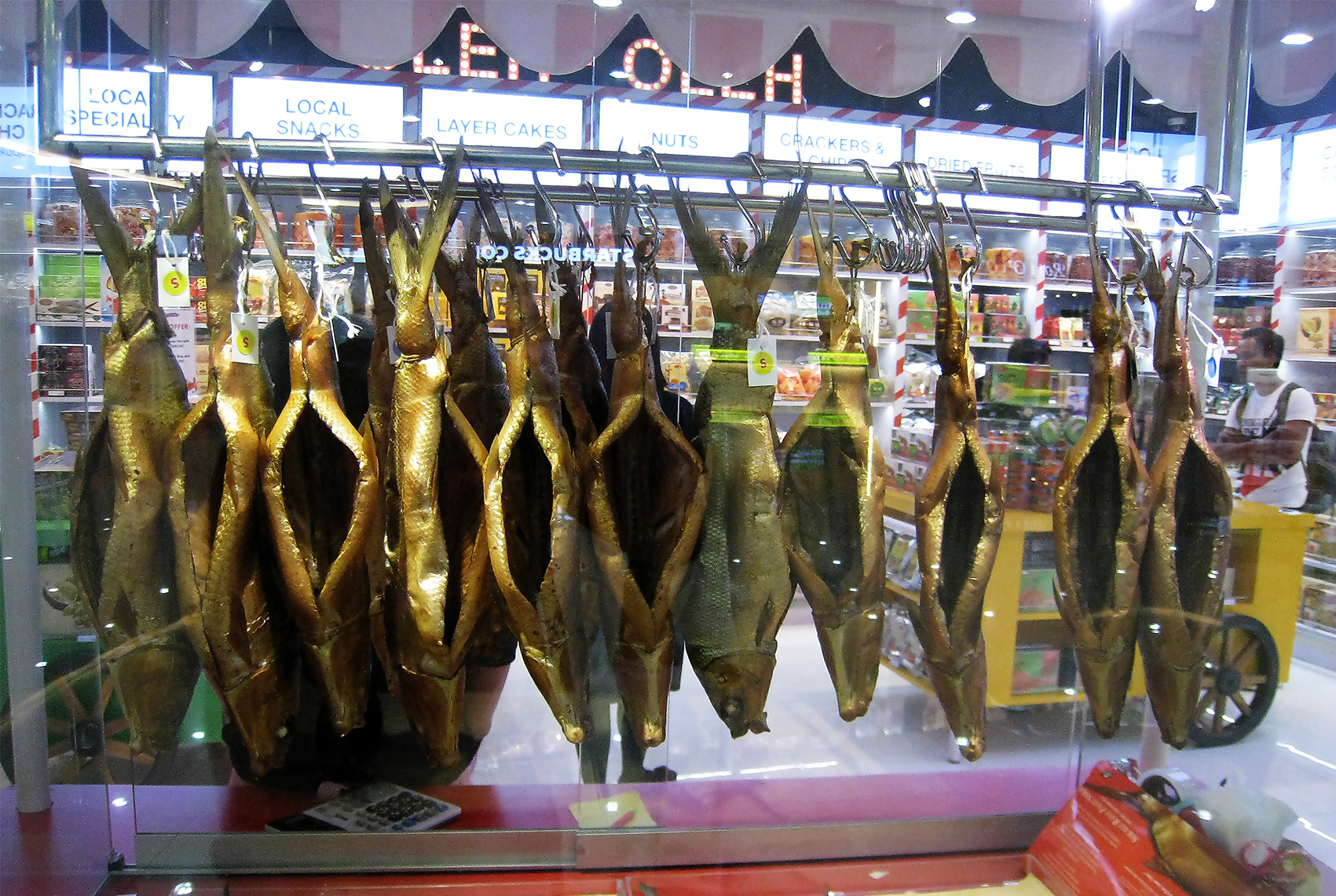
Smoked milkfish, sold in Juanda International Airport, Surabaya

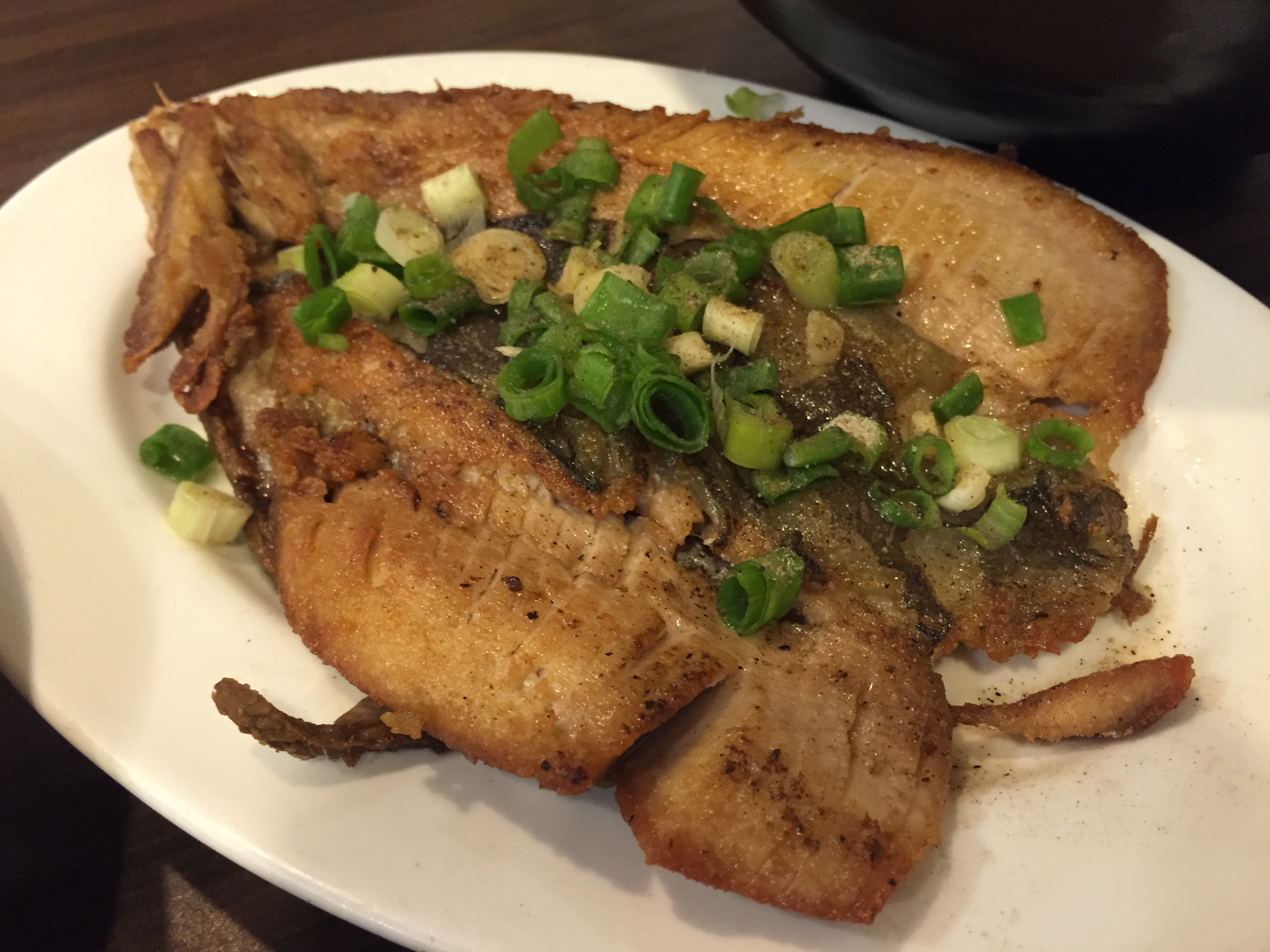
Fried milkfish belly fillet served at restaurant in Taipei, Taiwan

The milkfish is an important seafood in Southeast Asia and some Pacific Islands. Because it is notorious for being much bonier than other food fish, deboned milkfish, called "boneless bangús" in the Philippines, has become popular in stores and markets. Despite the notoriety however, many people in the Philippines continue to enjoy the fish cooked regularly and even prepared raw using kalamansi juice or vinegar to make kiniláw na bangús.

Popular presentations of milkfish in Indonesia include bandeng duri lunak (soft-boned milkfish, ikan bandeng is Indonesian for milkfish) from Central and East Java or bandeng presto, which is pressure cooked milkfish until the bones are rendered tender, and bandeng asap or smoked milkfish. Either fresh or processed, milkfish is the popular seafood product of Indonesian fishing towns, such as Juwana near Semarang in Central Java, and Sidoarjo near Surabaya in East Java.

Milkfish is the most popular fish in Taiwanese cuisine; it is valued for its versatility as well as its tender meat and economical price. Popular presentations include as a topping for congee, pan fried, braised, and as fish balls. There is a milkfish museum in Anping District and city of Kaohsiung holds an annual milkfish festival.

Milkfish is an oily fish, and is rich in omega-3 fatty acids.

== Aquaculture ==
=== History ===
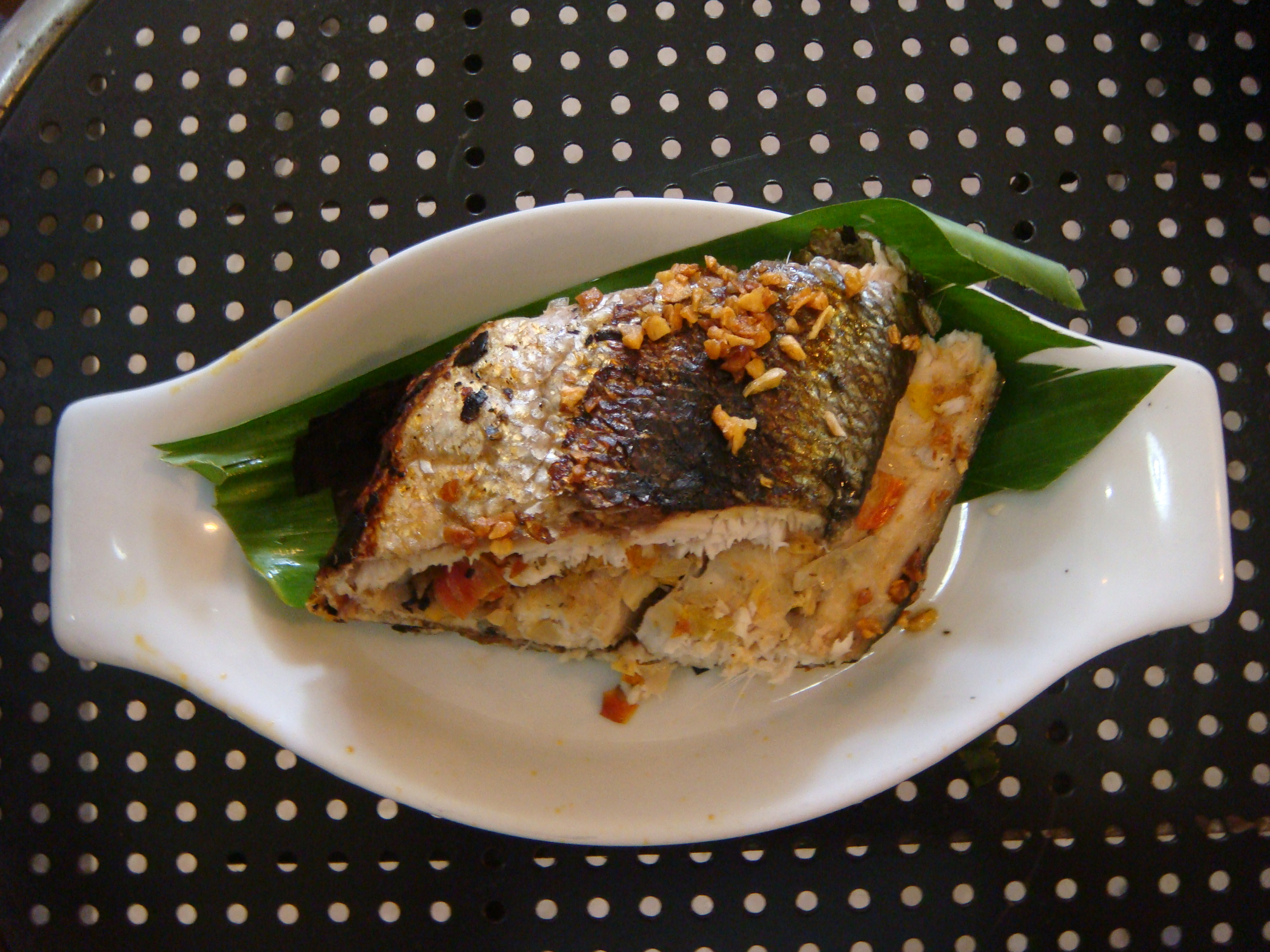
Grilled bangus (milkfish) in the Philippines

Global aquaculture production of milkfish (Chanos chanos) in million tonnes from 1950 to 2022, as reported by the FAO

Milkfish aquaculture first occurred around 1800 years ago in the Philippines and spread to Indonesia, Taiwan, and into the Pacific. Traditional milkfish aquaculture relied upon restocking ponds by collecting wild fry. This led to a wide range of variability in quality and quantity between seasons and regions.

In the late 1970s, farmers first successfully spawned breeding fish. However, they were hard to obtain and produced unreliable egg viability. In 1980, the first spontaneous spawning happened in sea cages. These eggs were found to be sufficient to generate a constant supply for farms.

Milkfish aquaculture accounts for 14% of all aquaculture production worldwide. Indonesia and the Philippines were the leading producers of the species in 2017. The fish is especially desirable for aquaculture because of its rapid growth rate, disease resistance, acclimation to captivity, low mortality, high market value, and high-quality flesh.

=== Farming methods ===
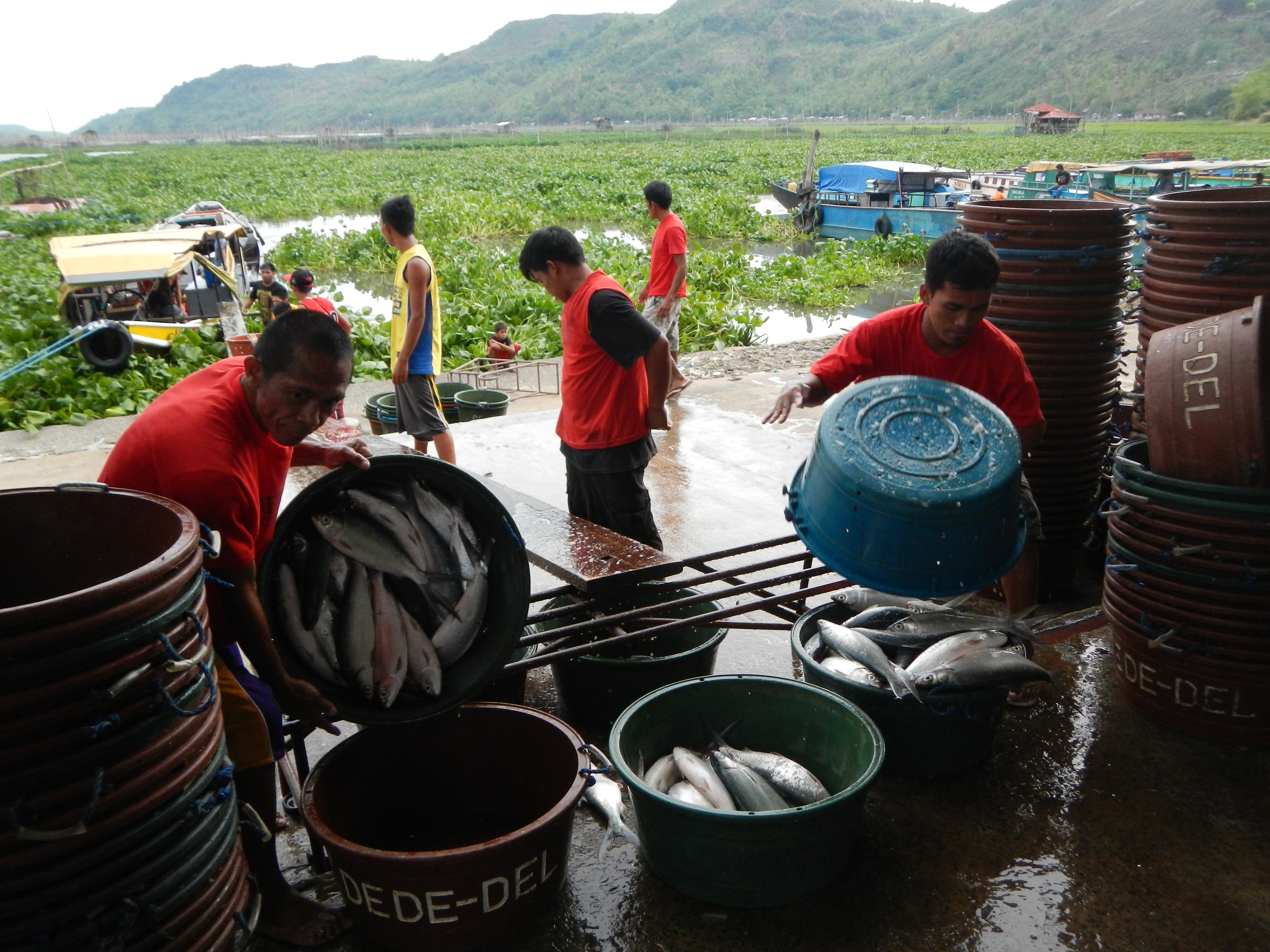
Milkfish aquaculture in fish ponds in Cardona, Rizal, the Philippines

Fry are raised in either sea cages, large saline ponds (Philippines), or concrete tanks (Indonesia, Taiwan). Milkfish reach sexual maturity at 1.5 kg (3.3 lb), which takes five years in floating sea cages, but eight to 10 years in ponds and tanks. Once they reach 6 kg (13 lb), (eight years), 3–4 million eggs are produced each breeding cycle. This is mainly done using natural environmental cues. However, attempts have been made using gonadotropin-releasing hormone analogue (GnRH-A) to induce spawning. Some still use the traditional wild stock method, capturing wild fry using nets. Milkfish hatcheries, like most hatcheries, contain a variety of cultures, for example, rotifers, green algae, and brine shrimp, as well as the target species. They can either be intensive or semi-intensive. Semi-intensive methods are more profitable at US$6.67 (equivalent to $13.18 in 2025) per thousand fry in 1998, compared with US$27.40 (equivalent to $54.12 in 2025) for intensive methods. However, the experience required by labour for semi-intensive hatcheries is higher than intensive. Milkfish nurseries in Taiwan are highly commercial and have densities of about 2000/L. Indonesia achieves similar densities, but has more backyard-type nurseries. The Philippines has integrated nurseries with grow-out facilities and densities of about 1000/L. The three methods of outgrowing are pond culture, pen culture, and cage culture.

- Shallow ponds are found mainly in Indonesia and the Philippines. These are shallow (30–40 cm (12–16 in)), brackish ponds with benthic algae, usually used as feed. They are usually excavated from nipa or mangrove areas and produce about 800 kg/ha (710 lb/acre) per year. Deep ponds (2–3 m (6 ft 7 in – 9 ft 10 in)) have more stable environments and their use began in 1970. They so far have shown less susceptibility to disease than shallow ponds.
- In 1979, pen culture was introduced in Laguna de Bay, which had high primary production. This provided an excellent food source. Once this ran out, fertilizer was applied. They are susceptible to disease.
- Cage culture occurs in coastal bays. These consist of large cages suspended in open water. They rely largely on natural sources of food.

Most food is natural (known as lab-lab) or a combination of phytoplankton and macroalgae. Traditionally, this was made on site; food is now made commercially to order. Harvest occurs when the individuals are 20 to 40 cm (7.9 to 15.7 in) long and 250 to 500 g (8.8 to 17.6 oz) in weight. Partial harvests remove uniformly sized individuals with seine nets or gill nets. Total harvest removes all individuals and leads to a variety of sizes. Forced harvest happens when an environmental problem occurs, such as depleted oxygen due to algal blooms, and all stock is removed. Possible parasites include nematodes, copepods, protozoa, and helminths. Many of these are treatable with chemicals and antibiotics.

=== Challenges ===
Modern milkfish aquaculture faces some challenges: acquiring viable milkfish fry, overcoming their status as a low-value species, attempting to expand outside of an ethnic market and struggling to find a sustainable cost-production balance. In 1987, Taiwan developed the outdoor hatchery technique, which resulted in lower-cost technology, and their fry production surpassed that of the wild. Since then, Taiwan has been one of the biggest hatchery fry producers in the Indo-Pacific. To stimulate market demand, sellers have been taking a fast-food approach, to make the product more accessible and desirable to common consumers.

=== Processing and marketing ===
Traditional post-harvest processing include smoking, drying, and fermenting. Bottling, canning, and freezing are of recent origin. Demand has been steadily increasing since 1950. In 2005, 595,000 tonnes (586,000 long tons; 656,000 short tons) were harvested worth US$616 million.

A trend toward value-added products is occurring. In recent years, the possibility of using milkfish juveniles as bait for tuna long-lining has started to be investigated, opening up new markets for fry hatcheries.

=== Golden bangus ===
On April 21, 2012, a Filipino fisherman donated a milkfish with yellowish coloring to the Philippine Bureau of Fisheries and Aquatic Resources, which was later on called the "golden bangus". However, the fish soon died, allegedly because of a lower level of oxygen in the pond to which it was transferred.

== Cultural significance ==
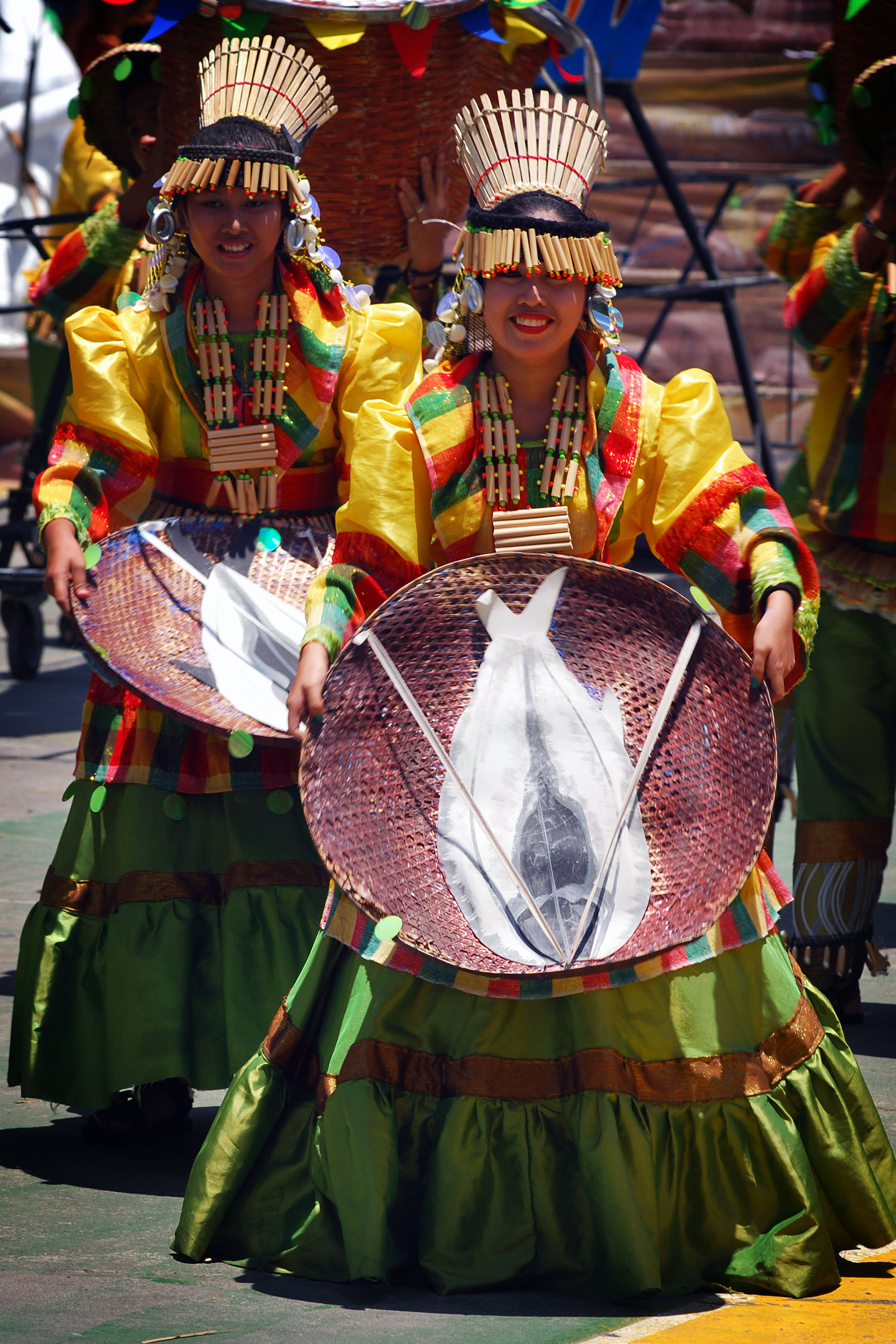
Street dancers in Dagupan depicting the bountiful harvest of bangus

Milkfish have appeared in the traditions and mythology of the native Pohnpeians, Hawaiians, Tongans, and Nauruans in the Pacific.

=== Bangus Festival ===
The city of Dagupan in Pangasinan, northern Philippines, hosts an annual Bangus Festival. The event was initially a bangus harvest or Gilon conceptualized in the 1990s by Mayor Al Fernandez. It has since become an extravagant occasion, including a street dance competitions named Gilon-gilon ed Dalan made to celebrate the bangus harvest. The festival also honors the city's patron saint, John the Apostle, who was originally a fisherman in the Sea of Galilee and figures prominently in several Gospel episodes featuring bountiful catches. Dagupan is considered the country's top producer of milkfish cultured in marine cages and pens. Two types of milkfish are cultured in the city, the more popular being Bonoan Bangus, often sold deboned and butterflied.

== See also ==
- Sate Bandeng
- Milkfish congee
