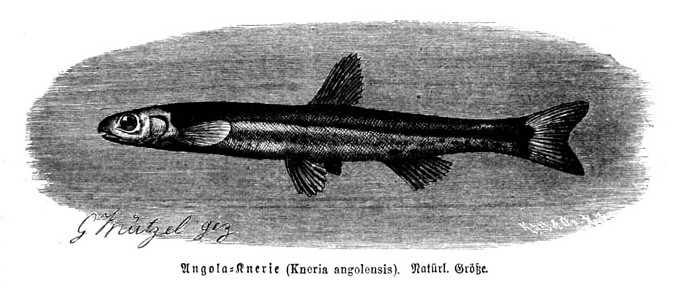
- Kneria angolensis

Scientific classification
- Kingdom: Animalia
- Phylum: Chordata
- Class: Actinopterygii
- Division: Teleostei
- Order: Gonorynchiformes
- Family: Kneriidae; Günther, 1868

Genera
- See text

= Kneriidae =

Kneriidae Temporal range: Middle Eocene to present

Family of fishes

The Kneriidae are a small family of freshwater gonorynchiform fishes native to sub-Saharan Africa.

The species in this family typically live in fast-flowing streams, often in highlands, and are small fish, no more than 15 cm (5.9 in) in length. The second subfamily Phractolaeminae contains only a single species, which typically inhabits stagnant or slow-moving waters and reaches up to 25 cm (9.8 in) in length. All Kneriidae have an elongated body shape. Some species are sexually dimorphic, with the male possessing a rosette on the gill covers that is absent in the females. Other species are neotenic, retaining larval features into adulthood.

== Classification ==
There are about 31 extant (living) species in four genera. Phractolaemidae is now regarded as a full family.

=== Genera ===
- Cromeria Boulenger, 1901
- Grasseichthys Géry, 1964
- Kneria Steindachner, 1866
- Parakneria Poll, 1965

In addition, the family includes the genus Mahengichthys Davis, Arratia & Kaiser, 2013, which only is known from Eocene fossil remains and is closer to Kneriinae than Phractolaemidae.
