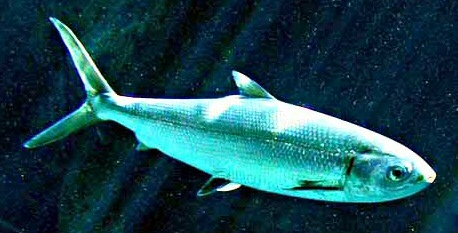
- Milkfish, Chanos chanos

Scientific classification
- Kingdom: Animalia
- Phylum: Chordata
- Class: Actinopterygii
- Cohort: Otocephala
- Superorder: Ostariophysi
- Clade: Anotophysi; Rosen and Greenwood, 1970
- Order: Gonorynchiformes; Greenwood, Rosen, Weitzman, and Myers, 1966

Type species
- Gonorynchus gonorynchus (Linnaeus, 1766)

Families
- Chanidae (milkfish); Gonorynchidae (beaked salmons); Kneriidae (shellears); Phractolaemidae (hingemouths)

= Gonorynchiformes =

Gonorynchiformes Temporal range: Early Cretaceous (Berriasian) to present

Order of fishes

The Gonorynchiformes /ɡɒnəˈrɪŋkɪfɔːrmiːz/ are an order of ray-finned fish that includes the important food source, the milkfish (Chanos chanos, family Chanidae), and a number of lesser-known types, both marine and freshwater.

Gonorynchiformes have small mouths and no teeth. They are the sole group in the clade Anotophysi, a subgroup of the superorder Ostariophysi. They are characterized by a primitive Weberian apparatus formed by the first three vertebrae and one or more cephalic ribs within the head. This apparatus is believed to be a hearing organ, and is found in a more advanced and complex form in the related cypriniform fish, such as carp. Also like the Cypriniformes, the Gonorynchiformes produce a substance from their skin when injured that dissolves into the water and acts an alarm signal to other fish.

== Etymology ==
The name comes from Ancient Greek γωνία (gōnía), meaning "angle", ῥύγχος (rhúnkhos), meaning "snout", and Latin formes, meaning "form".

== Taxonomy ==
Although many of the families are rather small, there are several fossil genera. This listing of the groups of Gonorynchiformes includes fossil fish with a short description. They are listed in approximate order of how primitive their characteristics are.

Phylogeny of living Gonorynchiformes

- Gonorynchiformes
  - Gonorynchidae
    Gonorynchus
  - - Chanidae
      Chanos
    - Kneriidae
      - Phractolaeminae
        Phractolaemus
      - Kneriinae
        - Kneria
        - - Parakneria
          - Cromeriini
            - Cromeria
            - Grasseichthys

The 5th edition of Fishes of the World classifies the extant taxa in this order as follows, as does Eschmeyer's Catalog of Fishes:

Order Gonorynchiformes Greenwood, Rosen, Weitzman, and Myers, 1966

- Family Chanidae Günther, 1868 (milkfishes)
- Family Gonorynchidae Richardson, 1848 (beaked sandfishes)
- Family Kneriidae Günther, 1868 (shellears)
- Family Phractolaemidae Boulenger, 1901 (snake mudheads)

=== Fossil taxa ===
The following fossil gonorynchiforms are also known:

- Genus †Lecceichthys Taverne, 1998 (Late Cretaceous of Italy)
- Genus †Sorbininardus Taverne, 1999 (Late Cretaceous of Italy)
- Family †Apulichthyidae Taverne, 1997 (Late Cretaceous of Italy)
- Family †Halecopsidae Casier, 1946 (Early Eocene of Europe)

== Bibliography ==
- Sepkoski, Jack (2002). "A compendium of fossil marine animal genera". Bulletins of American Paleontology. 364: 560. Archived from the original on 2011-07-23.
