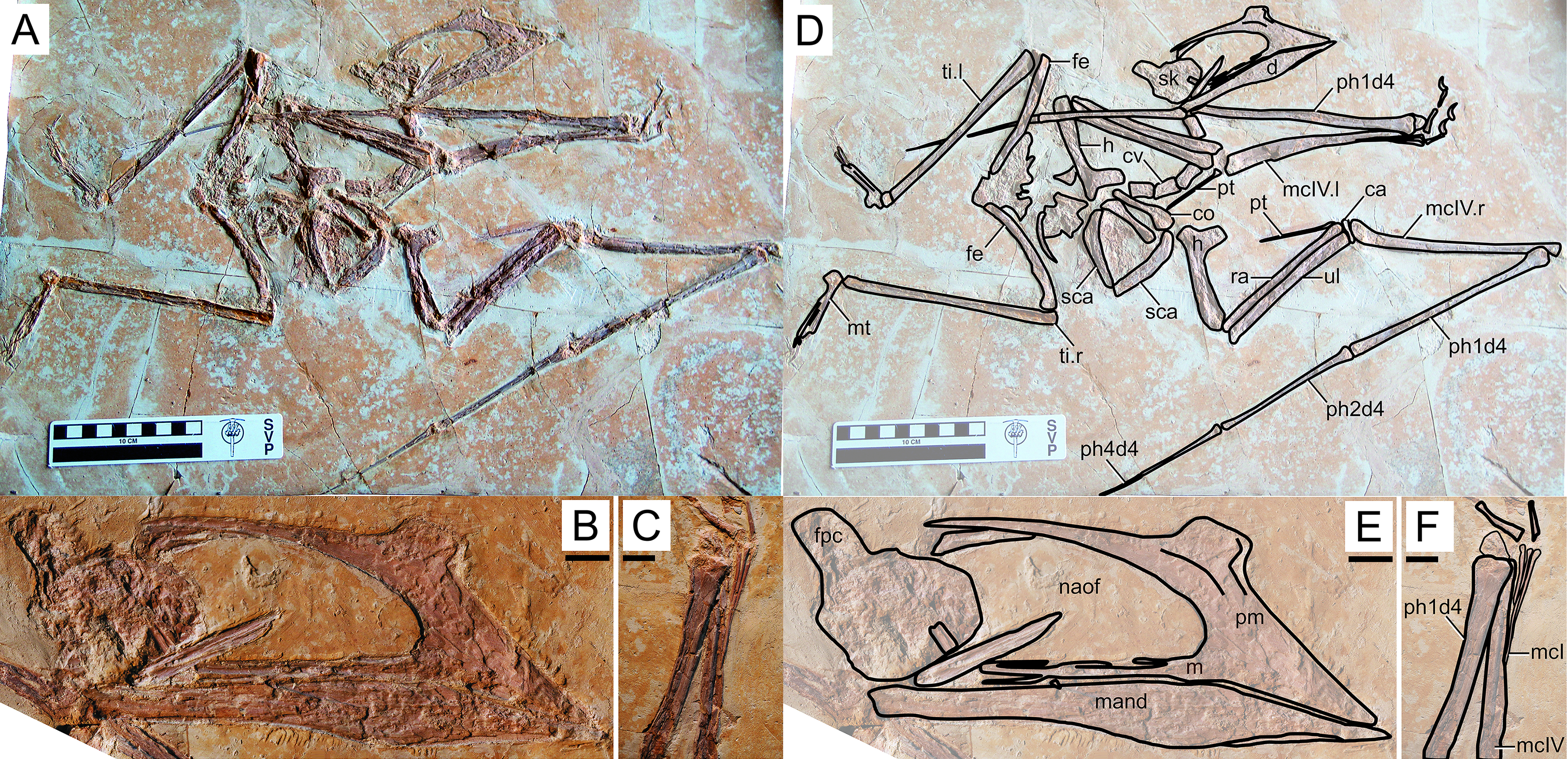
- Holotype specimen

Scientific classification
- Kingdom: Animalia
- Phylum: Chordata
- Class: Reptilia
- Order: †Pterosauria
- Suborder: †Pterodactyloidea
- Clade: †Azhdarchoidea
- Family: †Tapejaridae
- Subfamily: †Sinopterinae
- Genus: †Huaxiadraco; Pêgas et al., 2023

Type species
- †Huaxiapterus corollatus Lü et al., 2006

Synonyms
- Huaxiapterus corollatus (Lü et al., 2006); Huaxiapterus benxiensis (Lü et al., 2007)

= Huaxiadraco =

Huaxiadraco Temporal range: Early Cretaceous, 120 Ma

Genus of tapejarid pterosaur

Huaxiadraco (meaning "Hua Xia [China] dragon") is a genus of tapejarid pterodactyloid pterosaur from the Aptian-age Lower Cretaceous Jiufotang Formation of Chaoyang, Liaoning, China. It is the third valid genus of tapejarid from the Jehol Biota, after Sinopterus and Eopteranodon. It contains one species, Huaxiadraco corollatus, originally assigned to the defunct genus Huaxiapterus.

== History of discovery ==
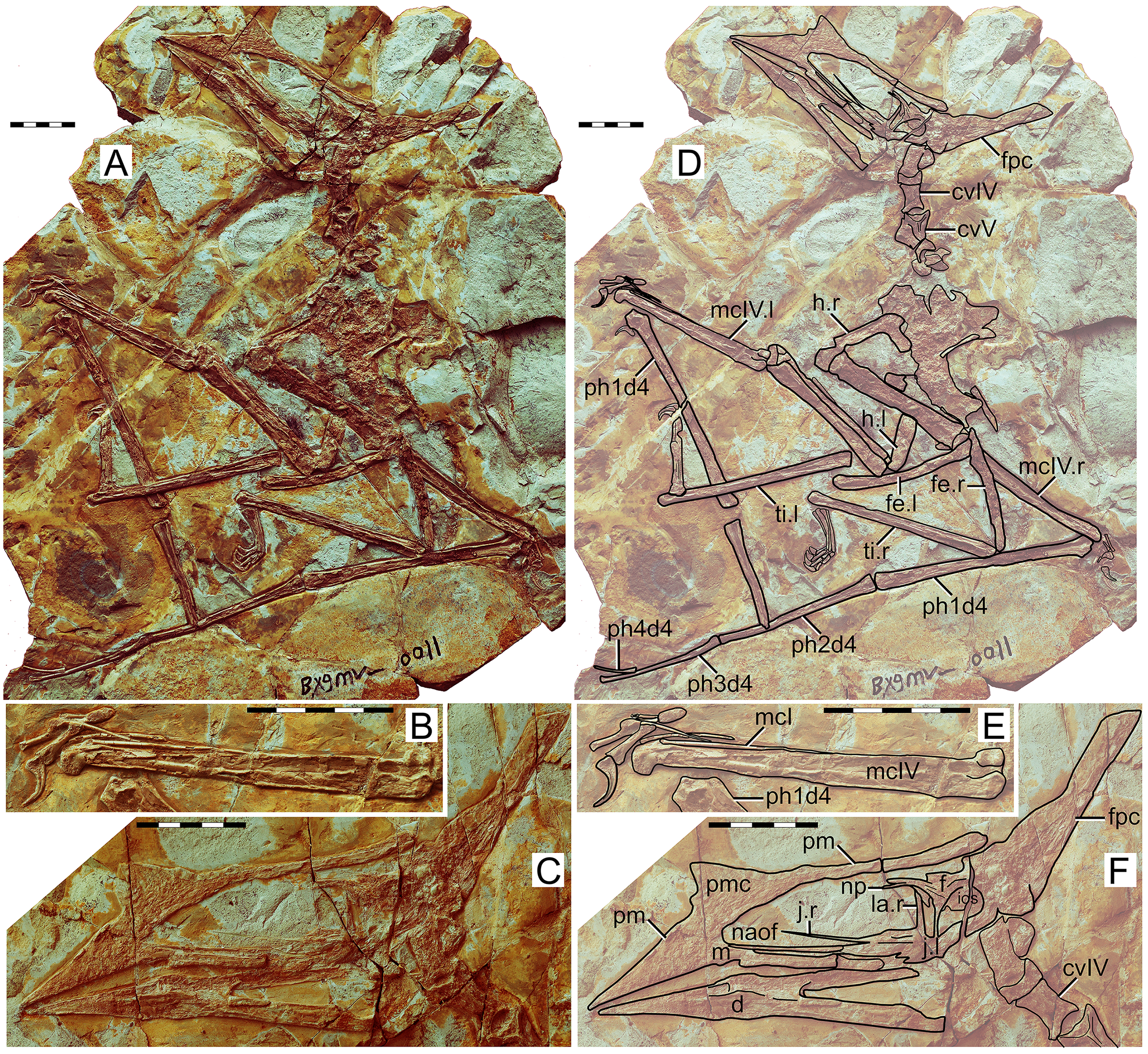
Holotype of Huaxiapterus benxiensis, a junior synonym of H. corollatus

Huaxiadraco is based on the holotype ZMNH M8131, a nearly complete skeleton. It was originally assigned to the genus Huaxiapterus by Lü Junchang and colleagues in 2006, under the binomial name Huaxiapterus corollatus. Lü et al. also named another species, Huaxiapterus benxiensis, a year later. However, analyses have since found that these species are only distantly related to Huaxiapterus jii, the type species of Huaxiapterus, and thus require a new genus name. A 2023 review of Chinese tapejarids by Pêgas et al. have confirmed these analyses, finding most of them (including Huaxipterus jii) to belong to the coeval Sinopterus dongi, although corollatus was found to belong to a distinct genus. They thus created Huaxiadraco for corollatus, synonymized benxiensis with it, and referred specimens D2525 (previously considered Sinopterus), BMPC 103, 104, and 105 to it.

== Classification ==
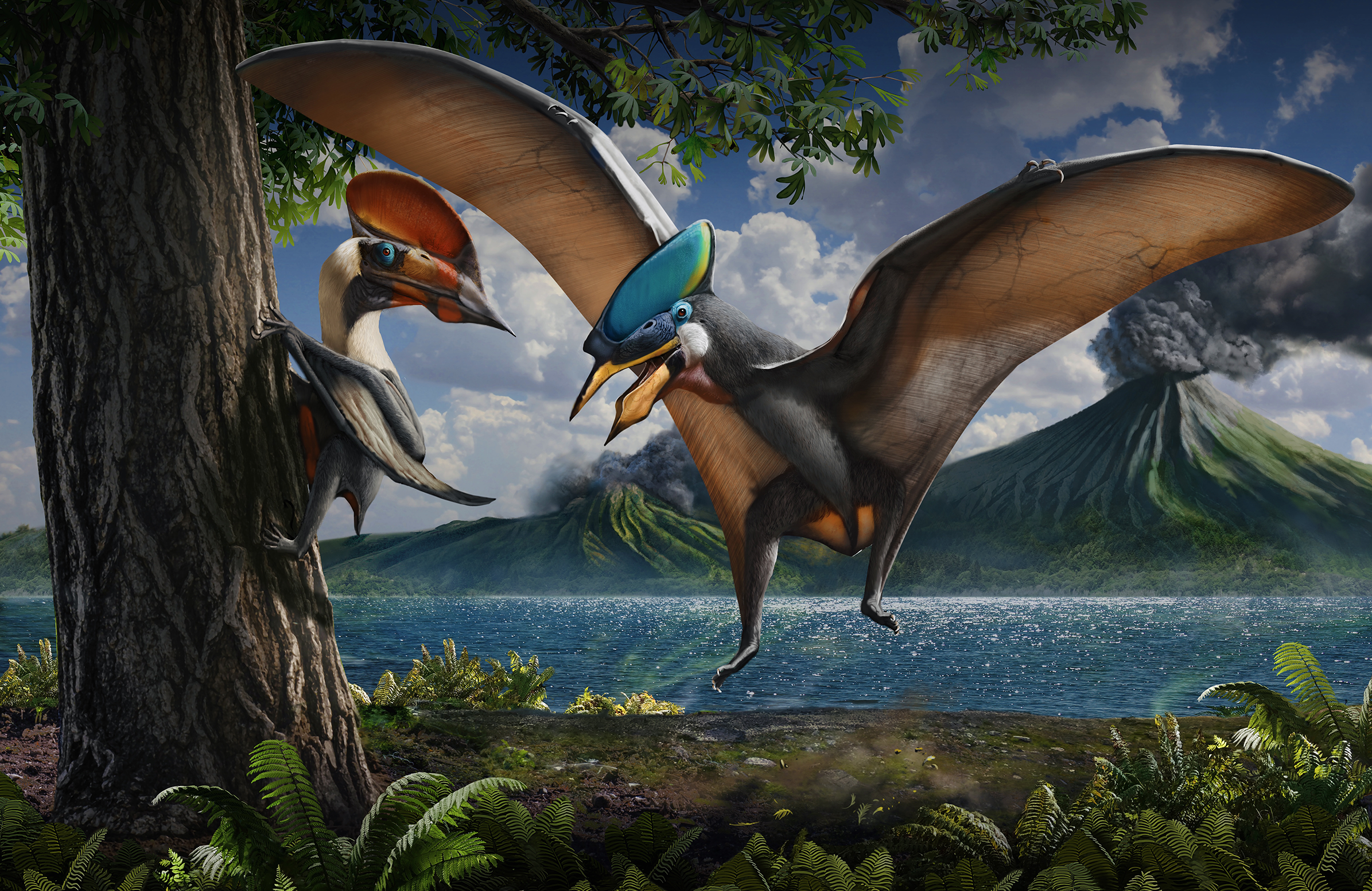
Life restorations of Sinopterus and Huaxiadraco in Jiufotang

Based on their reassessment of the Sinopterus species-complex, Pêgas et al. modified their working dataset, previously used in the redescription of Aerotitan. Their cladogram is shown below:

- Tapejaromorpha
  - Thalassodromidae
  - Tapejaridae
    - Caupedactylia
      - Caupedactylus ybaka
      - Aymberedactylus cearensis
    - Eutapejaria
      - Tapejarinae
        - Europejara olcadesorum
        - - - Tupandactylus imperator
            - Tupandactylus navigans
          - - Tapejara wellnhoferi
            - Caiuajara dobruskii
      - Sinopterinae
        - - Huaxiadraco corollatus
          - - Eopteranodon lii
            - Sinopterus dongi
        - - Wightia declivirostris
          - - Afrotapejara zouhrii
            - Bakonydraco galaczi
