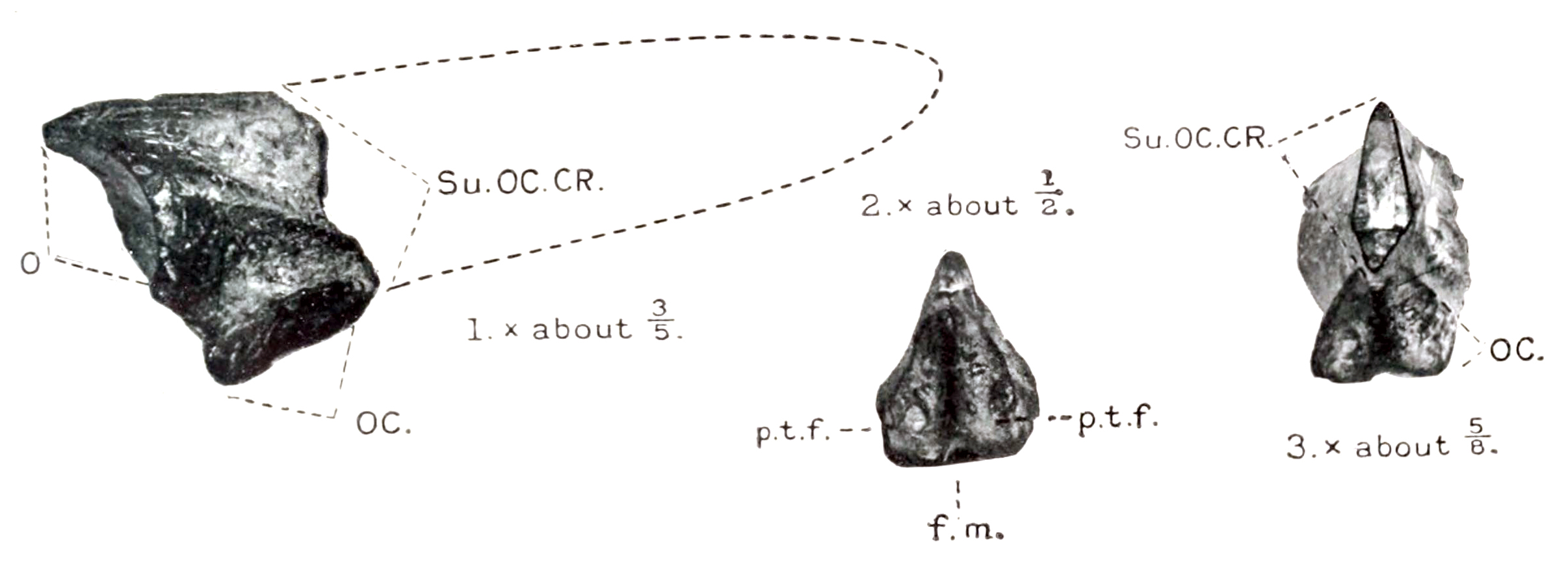
- Holotype as depicted in 1914

Scientific classification
- Kingdom: Animalia
- Phylum: Chordata
- Class: Reptilia
- Order: †Pterosauria
- Suborder: †Pterodactyloidea
- Clade: †Azhdarchoidea
- Family: †Tapejaridae
- Subfamily: †Sinopterinae
- Genus: †Hintighernia; Pêgas et al., 2026
- Species: †H. edingerae

Binomial name
- †Hintighernia edingerae Pêgas et al., 2026

= Hintighernia =

Hintighernia Temporal range: Early Cretaceous, 105 Ma

Extinct genus of pterosaurs

Hintighernia is a genus of tapejarid pterosaur from the Early Cretaceous of the Cambridge Greensand, United Kingdom. The type species is H. edingerae. It was named from a cranium earlier referred to the genus Ornithostoma.

Harry Govier Seeley named some pterosaur fossil fragments present in the collection of the Cambridge Sedgwick Museum of Earth Sciences as the genus Ornithostoma. Another fragment in the same collection, showing a broken skull crest, was referred to the genus Ornithocheirus. For many deacades Ornithocheirus was considered a crested form. However, in 1914 Reginald Walter Hooley referred the specimen to Ornithostoma, concluding that a crested Ornithocheirus was "a myth".

In 2026, after new study of the specimen, it was concluded that it represented a species new to science named Hintighernia edingerae by Rubi Vargas Pêgas, Kamila Luisa Nogueira Bandeira, Darren Naish and Borja Holgado. The generic name is a combination of Brittonic hɨnt, "lord" and tɨɣern, "path", as a translation of the related genus Tapejara, the "Lord of the Paths". The specific name honours the German paleontologist Johanna Ottilie Edinger, the founder of paleoneurology. In 1927 she had described a natural pterosaur brain endocast found near Cambridge, much resembling that of Hintighernia.
