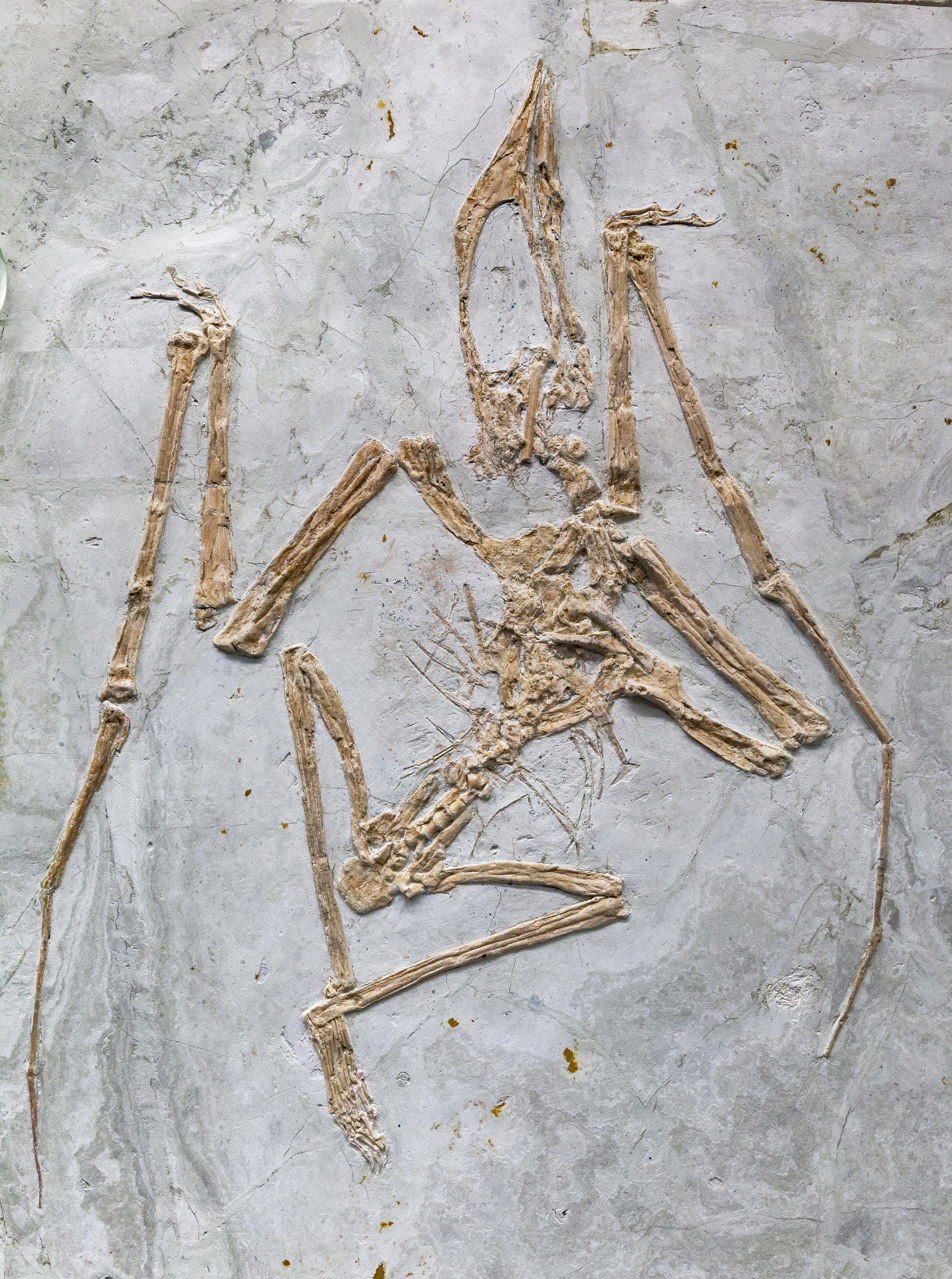
- Fossil specimen of S. dongi, National Museum of Natural Science

Scientific classification
- Kingdom: Animalia
- Phylum: Chordata
- Class: Reptilia
- Order: †Pterosauria
- Suborder: †Pterodactyloidea
- Clade: †Azhdarchoidea
- Family: †Tapejaridae
- Subfamily: †Sinopterinae
- Genus: †Sinopterus; Wang & Zhou, 2003

Type species
- †Sinopterus dongi Wang & Zhou, 2003

Synonyms
- Genus synonymy: Huaxiapterus Lü & Yuan, 2005; Species synonymy: Huaxiapterus atavismus Lü et al., 2016; Sinopterus atavismus (Lü et al., 2016) Zhang et al. 2019; Sinopterus gui Li et al., 2003; Huaxiapterus jii Lü & Yuan, 2005; Sinopterus jii (Lü & Yuan, 2005) Kellner and Campos, 2007; Sinopterus lingyuanensis Lü et al., 2016

= Sinopterus =

Sinopterus Temporal range: Early Cretaceous, 120 Ma

Genus of tapejarid pterosaur

Sinopterus (meaning "Chinese wing") is a genus of tapejarid pterodactyloid pterosaur from the Aptian-age Lower Cretaceous Jiufotang Formation of Chaoyang, Liaoning, China. It was first described and named by Wang Xiaolin and Zhou Zhonghe. Historically, there were multiple species attributed to the genus although only one is considered to be valid. Sinopterus is known for its proportionally large skull, which has a bird-like pointed beak lacking teeth, and a long bony crest that starts with a tall premaxilla and goes back along the middle of the skull to form a point overhanging the rear of the skull. Direct dietary evidence based on gut contents suggest that Sinopterus is a herbivore.

== History of discovery ==
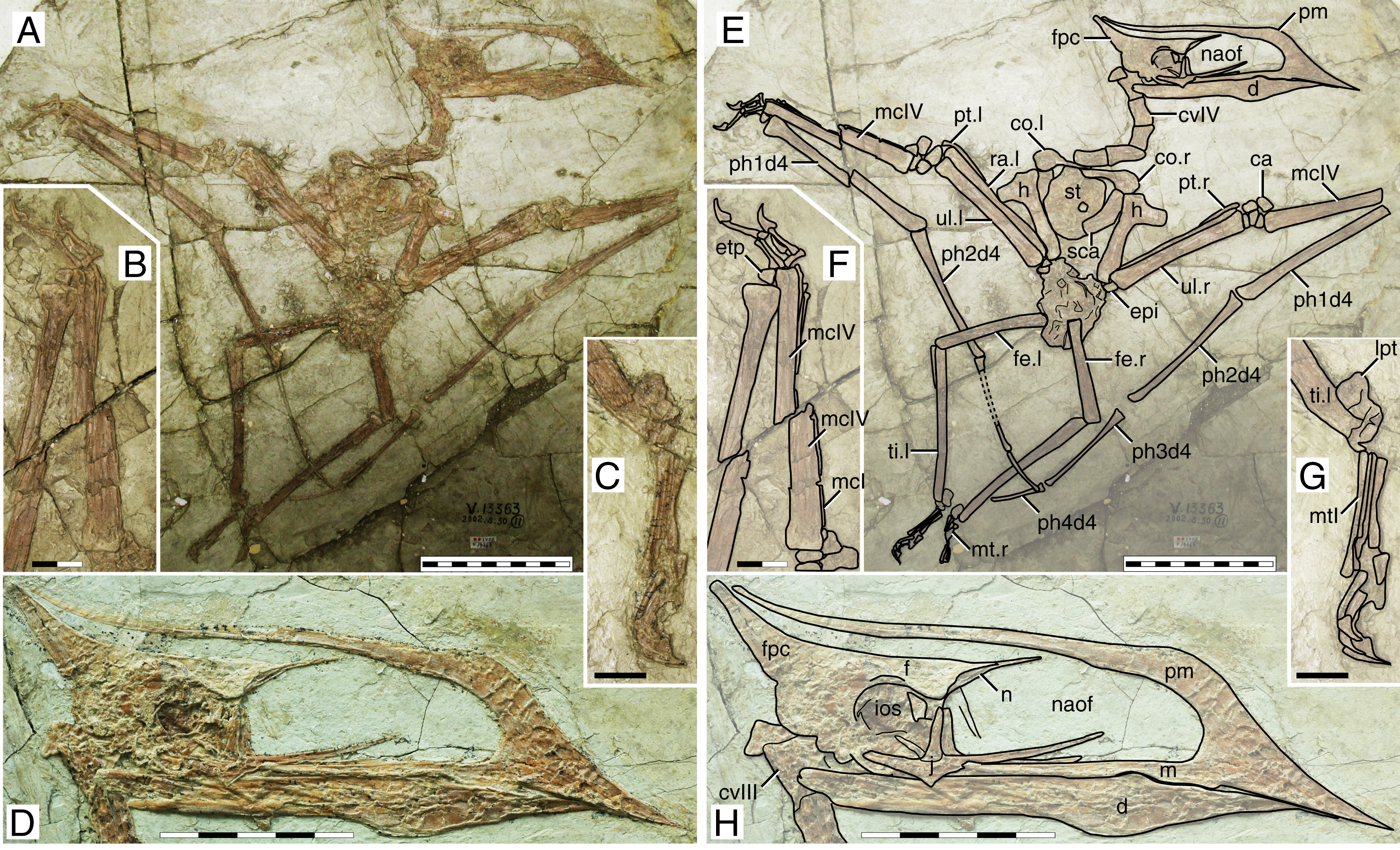
Holotype specimen of S. dongi

Sinopterus is known from numerous specimens, some of which have been assigned to unique species and even different genera over the years. The type species, Sinopterus dongi, is known from one specimen described in 2003. A second specimen, BPV-077, was also described in 2003 by Li, Lü, and Zhang, who classified it in its own species, S. gui. It was said to differ from S. dongi mainly in its smaller size (only about half the size of S. dongi) and the presence of a notarium, though this was later disproved. Some later studies found S. gui to simply represent a younger specimen of S. dongi, though one large analysis in 2014 found it to be a more primitive tapejarid.

A third specimen was referred to Sinopterus in 2007, again classified as a new species, this time given the name S. jii. This species was first named by Lü & Yuan in 2005 as the type species of a new genus which they named Huaxiapterus. Two later studies in 2007 and 2011 both showed that H. jii was in fact more closely related to Sinopterus than to the two other species also assigned to Huaxiapterus, "H." corollatus and "H." benxiensis. Both groups of researchers concluded that Huaxiapterus jii should therefore be reclassified as Sinopterus jii, and that the other two species of "Huaxiapterus" require a new genus name. However, a more complete phylogenetic analysis suggested that Sinopterus may actually be an intermediate step in the grade between H. jii and the other two Huaxiapterus species, making Sinopterus paraphyletic if H. jii is included.

In 2016, another species, S. lingyuanensis, was named. It purportedly differed from the other species in the proportions of its nasoantorbital fenestra, its rostral index, the relative sizes of its femur and tibia, and the relative sizes of the first and second wing digits. In the same paper describing this species, the species Huaxiapterus atavismus was also named. However, Xinjun Zhang and colleagues in 2019 considered Huaxiapterus an invalid genus and therefore reassigned H. atavismus to Sinopterus, which created the new combination Sinopterus atavismus.

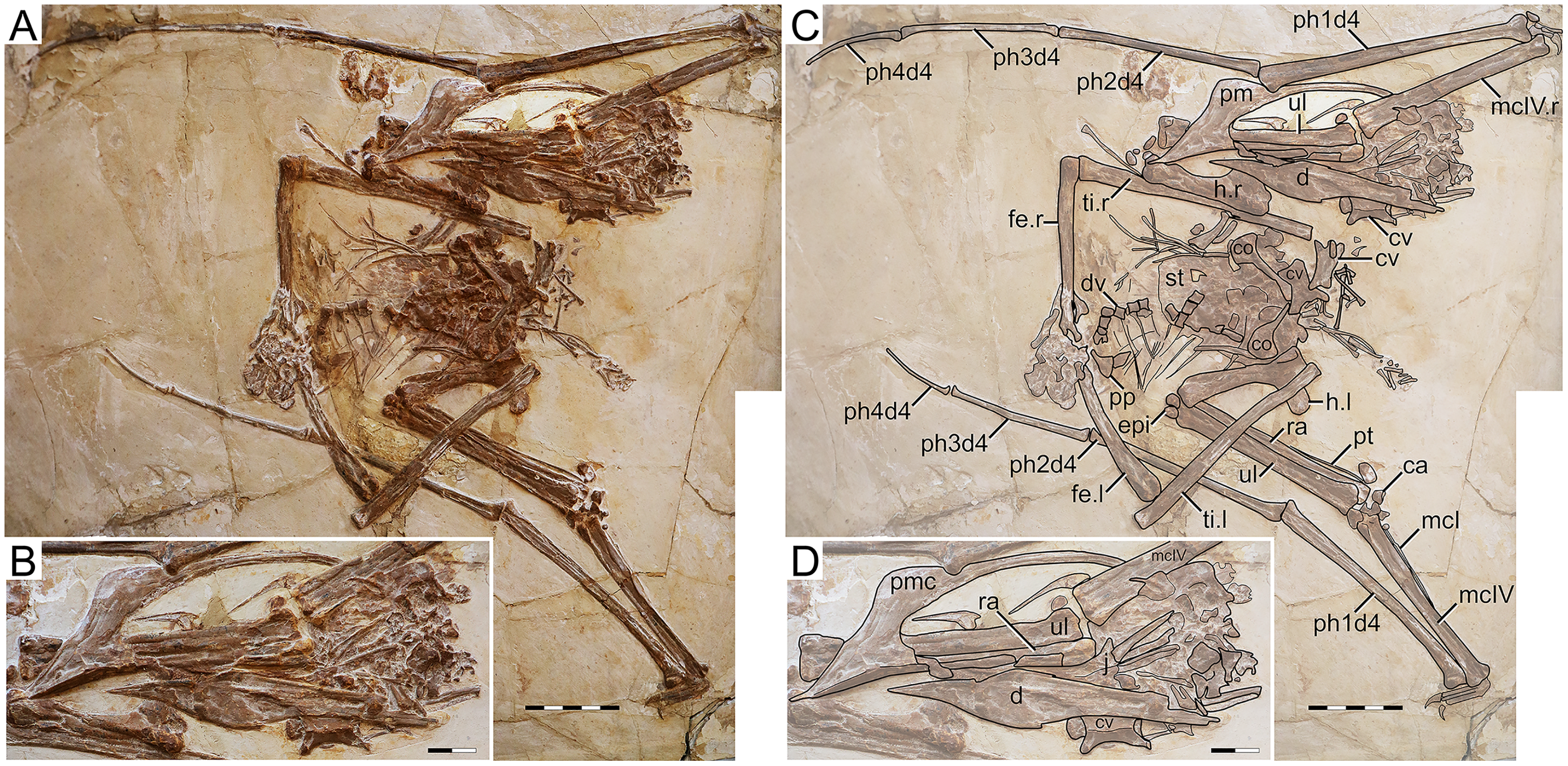
Holotype specimen of Huaxiapterus jii, now considered a synonym of S. dongi

A 2021 study by Darren Naish and colleagues of variation within pterosaur growth stages noted that numerous species had been classified as Sinopterus or "Huaxiapterus", most based only on a single specimen, and most differentiated from each other by features like wing proportions, skull length, and crest shape and size. Naish et al. pointed out that all of these features are known to be variable within a single species due to growth, and that there were unlikely to be such a high diversity of extremely similar species in the same ecosystem when their differences are more likely due to variation within a few species. They suggested that a larger study would be needed to untangle the question of how many species of Sinopterus-like pterosaurs actually existed in the Jiufotang ecosystem, and how they are related to each other. In a preliminary opinion, these scientists stated that there is likely only one valid species of Sinopterus, S. dongi, but that "Huaxiapterus" corollatus might be a valid second species based on unique wing and leg proportions.

In 2023, Rubi V. Pêgas et al. reviewed the recent taxonomic histories of the tapejarids. In their article, they made S. gui and S. lingyuanensis synonymous with S. dongi. In addition, the genus Huaxiapterus was synonymized with Sinopterus as a result of H. jii and H. atavismus being reclassified as synonyms of S. dongi and "H." corollatus being reclassified to the new genus Huaxiadraco from which Huaxiapterus benxiensis became synonymous with.

== Description ==
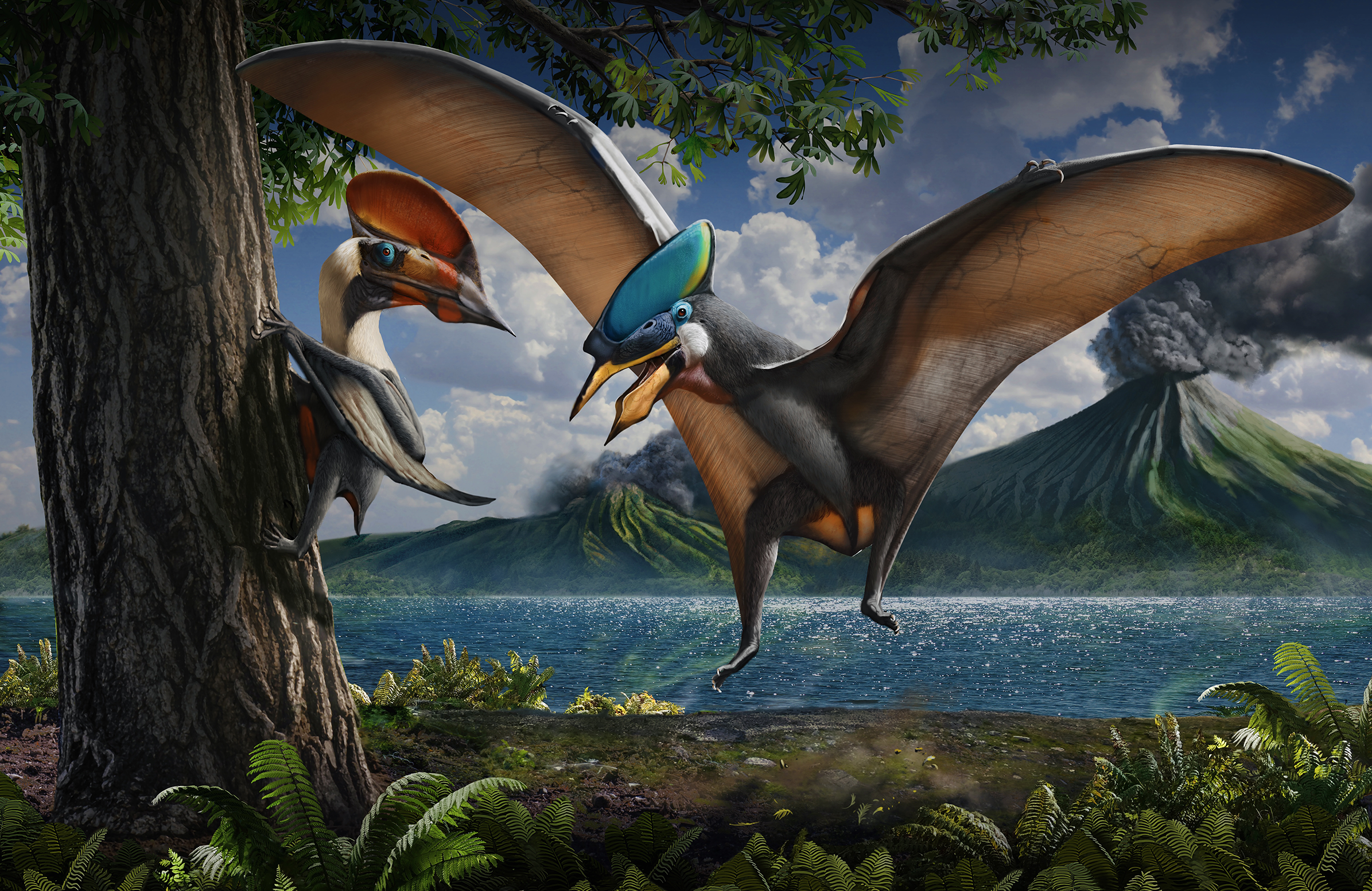
Life restorations of Sinopterus and Huaxiadraco in Jiufotang

The type species, S. dongi, is based on IVPP V13363, an articulated, nearly complete skeleton. The skull of this individual was 17 centimeters (6.7 inches) long, and the wingspan was estimated to be 1.2 meters (3.9 feet). The authors suggested that it was an omnivore, and noted that it was the first record of a tapejarid outside of Brazil, and the earliest and most complete tapejarid. The maximum adult wingspan of this pterosaur would have been 1.9 metres (6.2 ft), and an individual of this size would have weighed 2.87 kg (6.3 lb).

== Classification ==
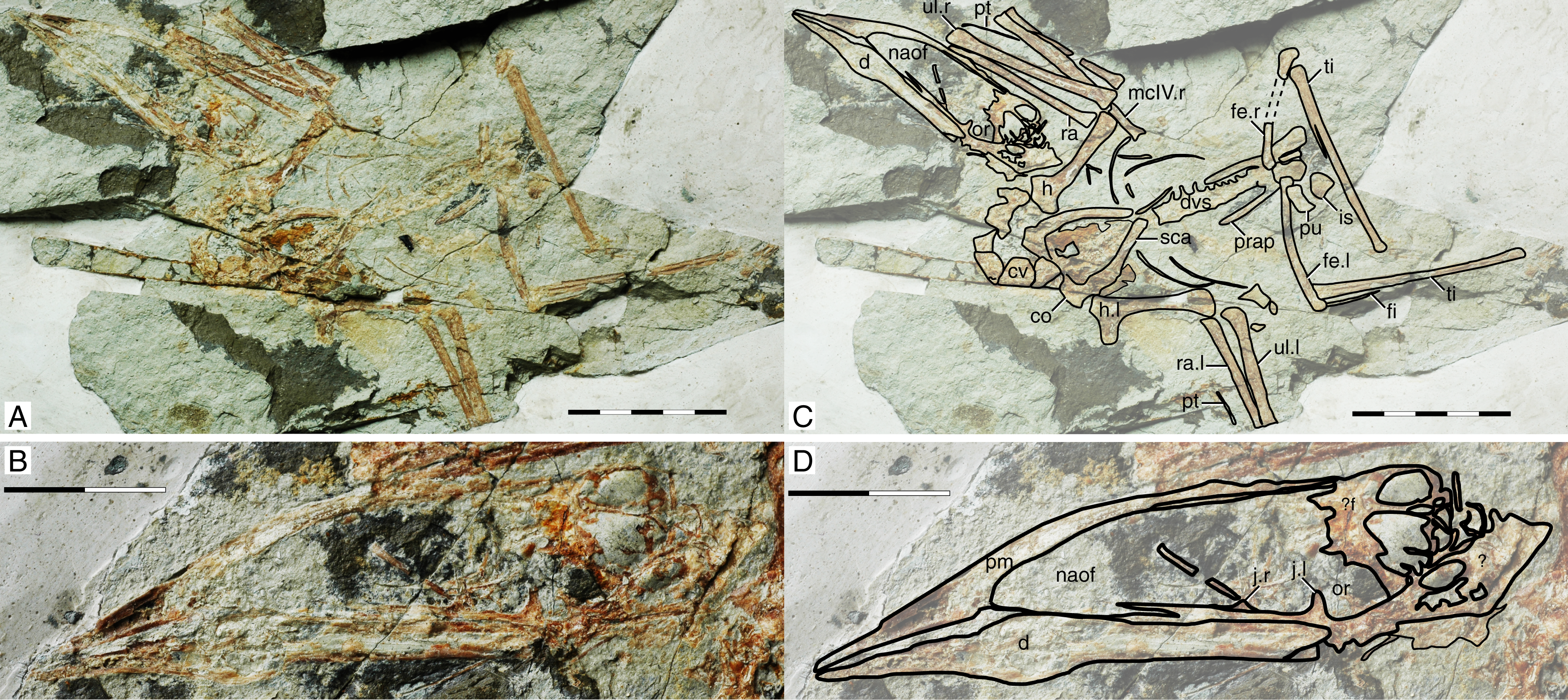
Holotype of S. gui, which may be a junior synonym of S. dongi

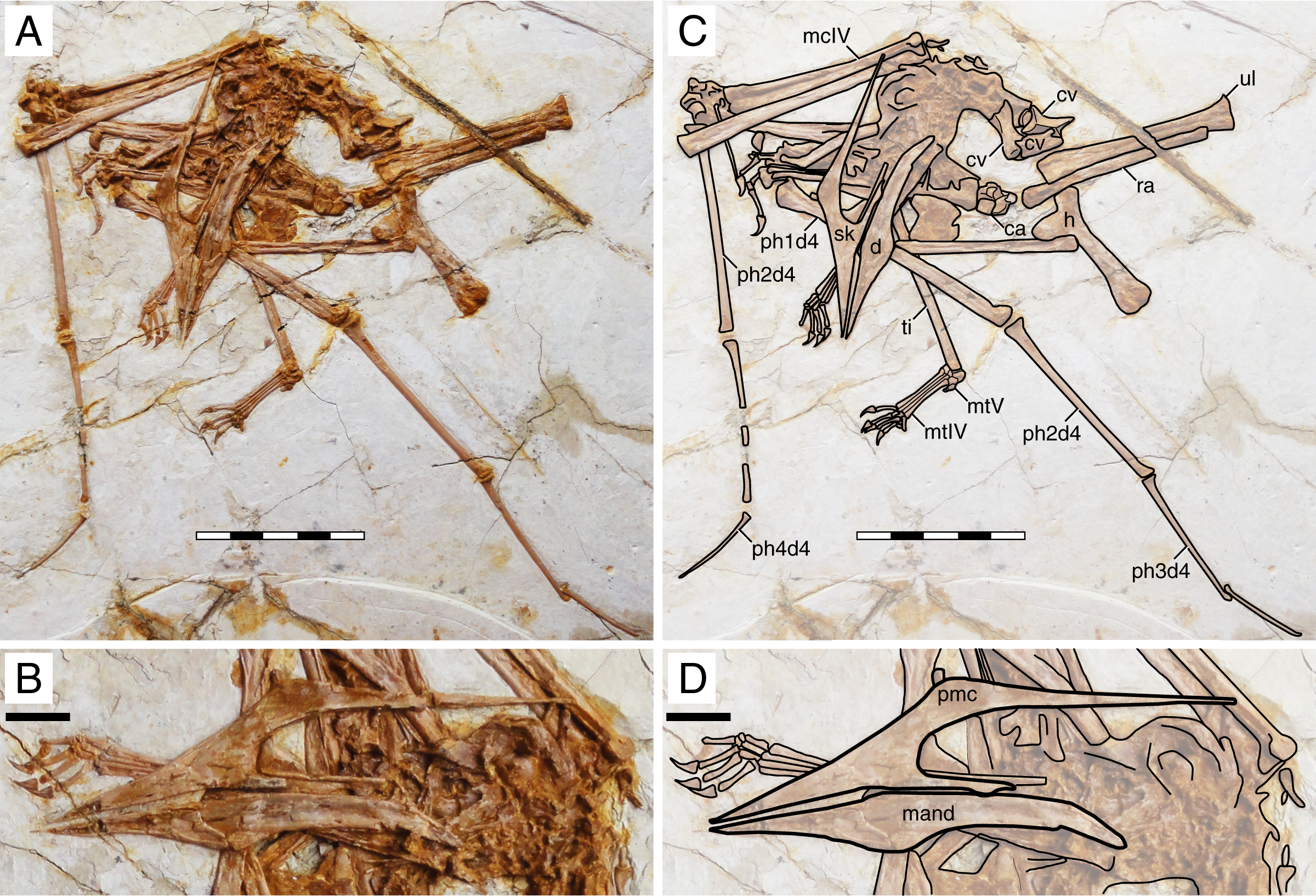
Holotype of H. atavismus, which may be a junior synonym of S. dongi

The cladogram below follows the 2014 analysis by Brian Andres and colleagues, showing the placement of two Sinopterus species ("S." gui and S. dongi) within the clade Tapejaromorpha.

- Tapejaromorpha
  - Bennettazhia oregonensis
  - - - Eopteranodon lii
      - - "Sinopterus" gui
        - Nemicolopterus crypticus
    - - Huaxiapterus jii
      - Tapejaridae
        - Sinopterus dongi
        - Tapejarinae
          - - "Huaxiapterus" benxiensis
            - "Huaxiapterus" corollatus
          - Tapejarini
            - - Tupandactylus navigans
              - Tupandactylus imperator
            - - Bakonydraco galaczi
              - - Europejara olcadesorum
                - Tapejara wellnhoferi

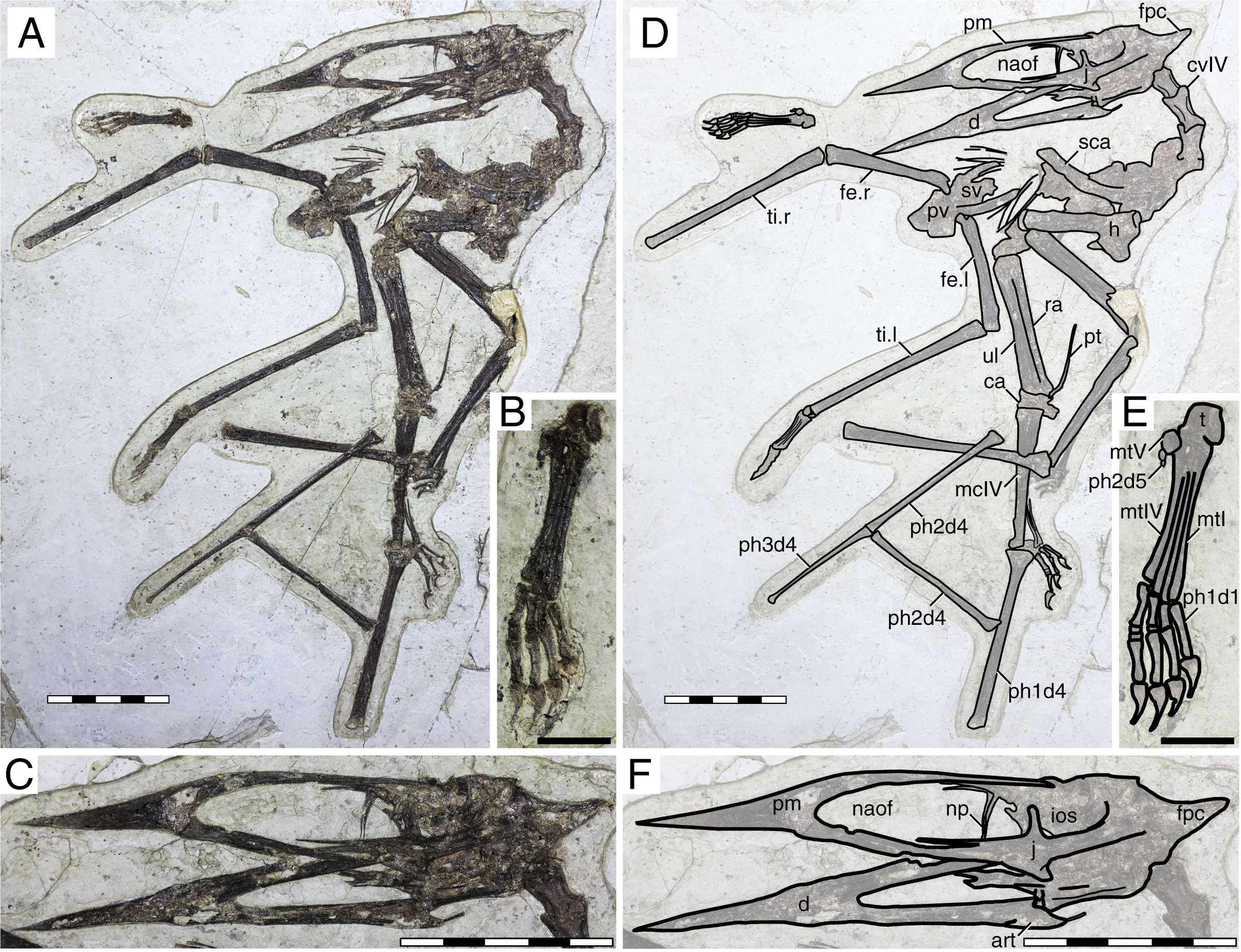
Holotype of S. lingyuanensis, which may be a junior synonym of S. dongi

Based on their reassessment of the Sinopterus species-complex, Pêgas et al. modified their working dataset, previously used in the redescription of Aerotitan. Their cladogram is shown below:

- Tapejaromorpha
  - Thalassodromidae
  - Tapejaridae
    - Caupedactylia
      - Caupedactylus ybaka
      - Aymberedactylus cearensis
    - Eutapejaria
      - Tapejarinae
        - Europejara olcadesorum
        - - - Tupandactylus imperator
            - Tupandactylus navigans
          - - Tapejara wellnhoferi
            - Caiuajara dobruskii
      - Sinopterinae
        - - Huaxiadraco corollatus
          - - Eopteranodon lii
            - Sinopterus dongi
        - - Wightia declivirostris
          - - Afrotapejara zouhrii
            - Bakonydraco galaczi

== Paleobiology ==
=== Growth ===
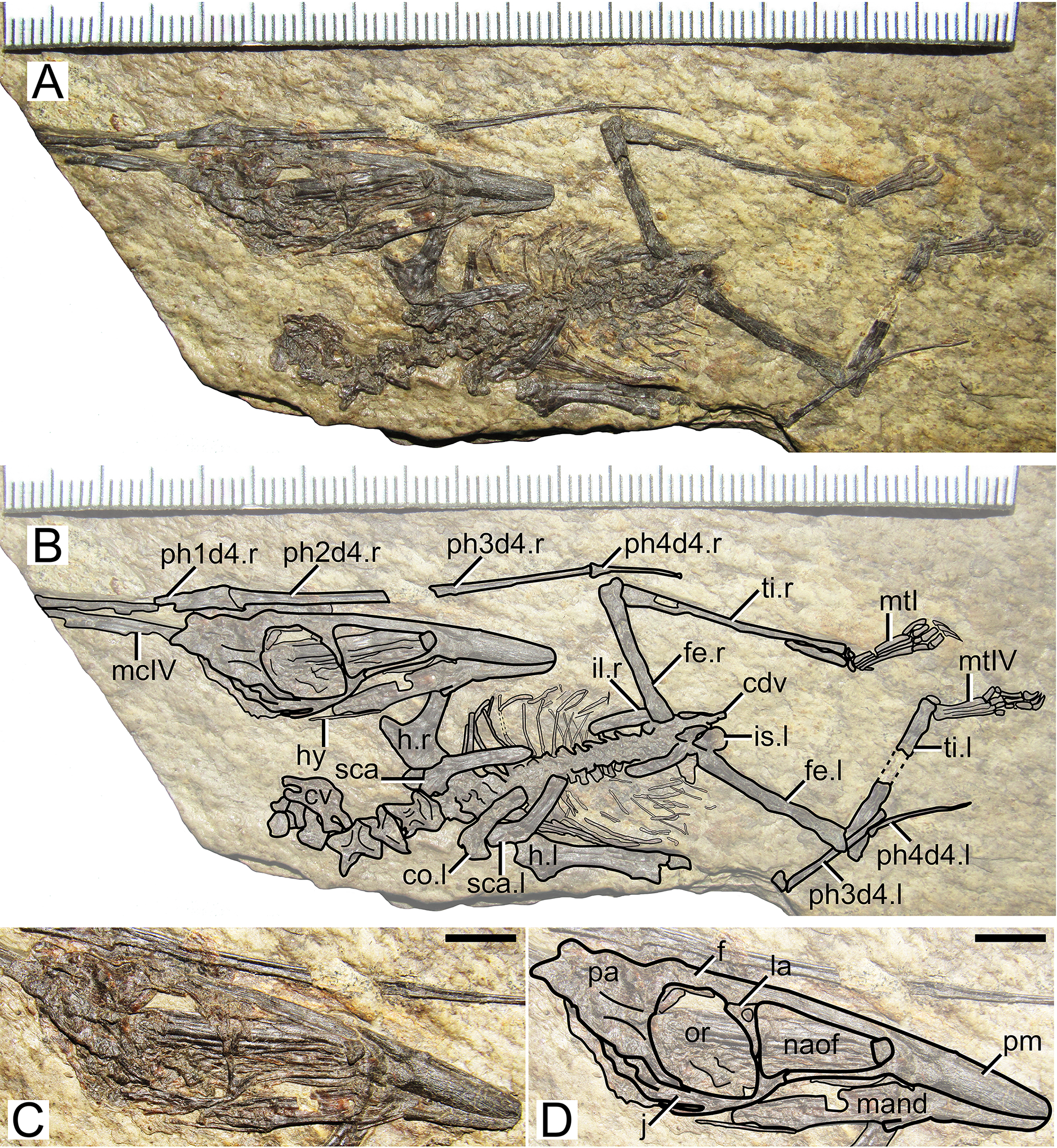
Juvenile Nemicolopterus specimen IVPP V-14377, which may be Sinopterus

Sinopterus is known from several specimens at various stages of growth, which has allowed scientists to study the changes these animals went through during their life histories.

At least one very small juvenile (possibly hatchling) specimen has been attributed to Sinopterus. This specimen was originally classified as a distinct genus in 2008, Nemicolopterus crypticus. The name Nemicolopterus comes from the Greek words "Nemos" meaning "forest", "ikolos" meaning "dweller", and the Latinised "pteron" meaning "wing". The specific name crypticus is derived from the Greek "kryptos", meaning "hidden". Thus "Nemicolopterus crypticus" means "Hidden flying forest dweller". The type specimen of N. crypticus, catalog number IVPP V-14377, is housed in the collection of the Institute of Vertebrate Paleontology and Paleoanthropology in Beijing, China. The fossil was collected from the Jiufotang Formation, like all adult Sinopterus specimens. It was discovered in the Luzhhouou locality of Yaolugou Town, Jianchang County, Huludao City, western Liaoning Province in northeastern China. It has a wingspan of slightly under 25 centimeters (10 in), making it smaller than all but a few specimens of hatchling pterosaurs.

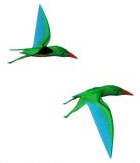
Life restoration of two Nemicolopterus

Wang et al. (2008), who originally described the specimen, concluded that it was immature, citing the amount of bone fusion and the ossification of the toes, gastralia, and sternum as indicating that it was a sub-adult rather than a hatchling. However, Darren Naish argued on his popular weblog that, due to the hypothesis that pterosaurs were highly precocial, bone fusion and ossification could have occurred very early in life, and that Nemicolopterus might in fact be a hatchling Sinopterus. This identification was formally presented in 2021 study, which found that Nemicolopterus fit into a growth series as a young juvenile or hatchling Sinopterus hatchling. An analysis of pterosaur relationships by Andres and colleagues in 2014 found the specimen in a sister group relationship with "Sinopterus" gui.

Based on study of hatchling Sinopterus skeletons as well as comparison with hatchlings of other pterosaur species, Naish and colleagues (2021) found that the wing proportions and bone strength/flexibility of hatchlings were similar to adults, and concluded that Sinopterus was capable of powered flight very shortly after hatching. They found that while young juveniles would have been excellent gliders, they would not have been reliant on gliding alone as opposed to true flight. Juveniles also seem to have been more adapted to flight in closed environments, like dense forests, compared to adults. Juveniles therefore probably occupied different ecological niches than adults, transitioning between different niches as they grew.

Osteohistological studies on a late juvenile individual of Sinopterus demonstrates that this taxon achieved sexual maturity before skeletal maturity, with onset of sexual maturity at approximately 79% adult size. The high number of juvenile Sinopterus fossils found compared to sexually mature adults suggests migratory habits, with mature adults living in different habitats from juvenile and subadult individuals.

=== Diet ===
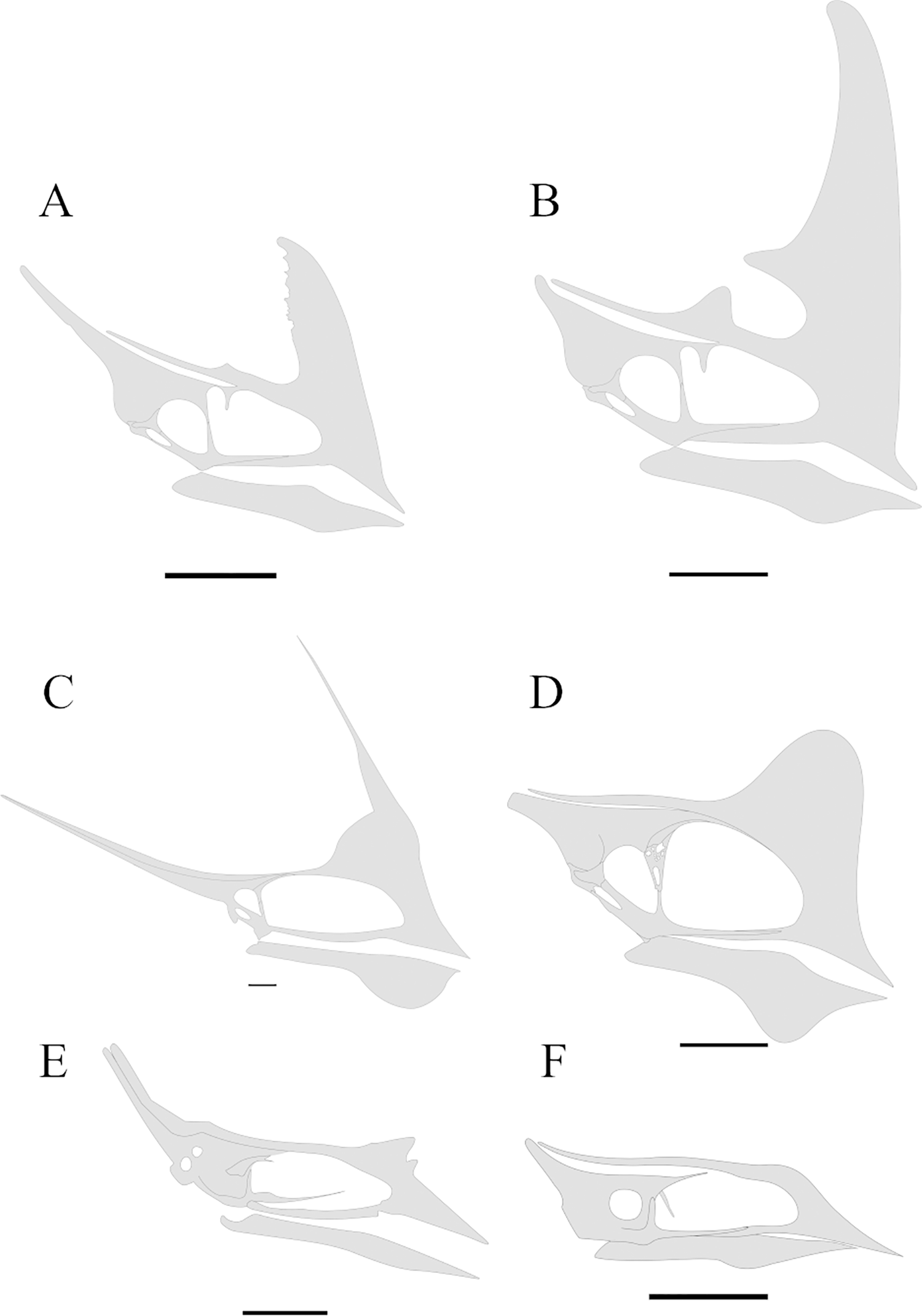
Comparison of tapejarid skulls, Sinopterus is F

Tapejarids like Sinopterus have long been speculated as having been frugivores or omnivores, based on their parrot-like beaks. In 2025, the palaeontologist Shunxing Jiang and colleagues reported stomach contents from the abdominal cavity of a Sinopterus specimen. These include gastroliths (stones used to aid food processing in the gizzard) and the first evidence of phytoliths in pterosaurs (minerals found in certain plants which persist after their decomposition), and the first evidence of these co-occurring in a pterosaur. Earlier known pterosaur stomach contents are all from more basal pterosaurs, containing fish remains. The gizzard of the Sinopterus specimen is similar to that of the bird Jeholornis, and the pattern and size of their gastroliths are similar; since both belonged to the Jehol Biota, these writers suggested they shared a herbivorous diet such as seeds and grains. Some of the phytoliths of the specimen were identified as the angiosperm family Poaceae as well as gymnosperms or ferns, indicating Sinopterus had a diverse diet of plants. While noting that tapejarids and some other pteosaurs had earlier been suggested as herbivorous based on indirect evidence, these researchers considered the gut contents confirmation of herbivory, and excluded a generalist diet for Sinopterus as for example no undigested bones, scales, or insect exoskeletons were found. They also stated that bite force estimations of Tapejara had suggested a herbivorous diet of fruits, seeds, and more resistant plant matter, and added that the similarity between their skulls indicated similar bite forces, supporting a herbivorous diet for both.

== See also ==
- List of pterosaur genera
- Timeline of pterosaur research
