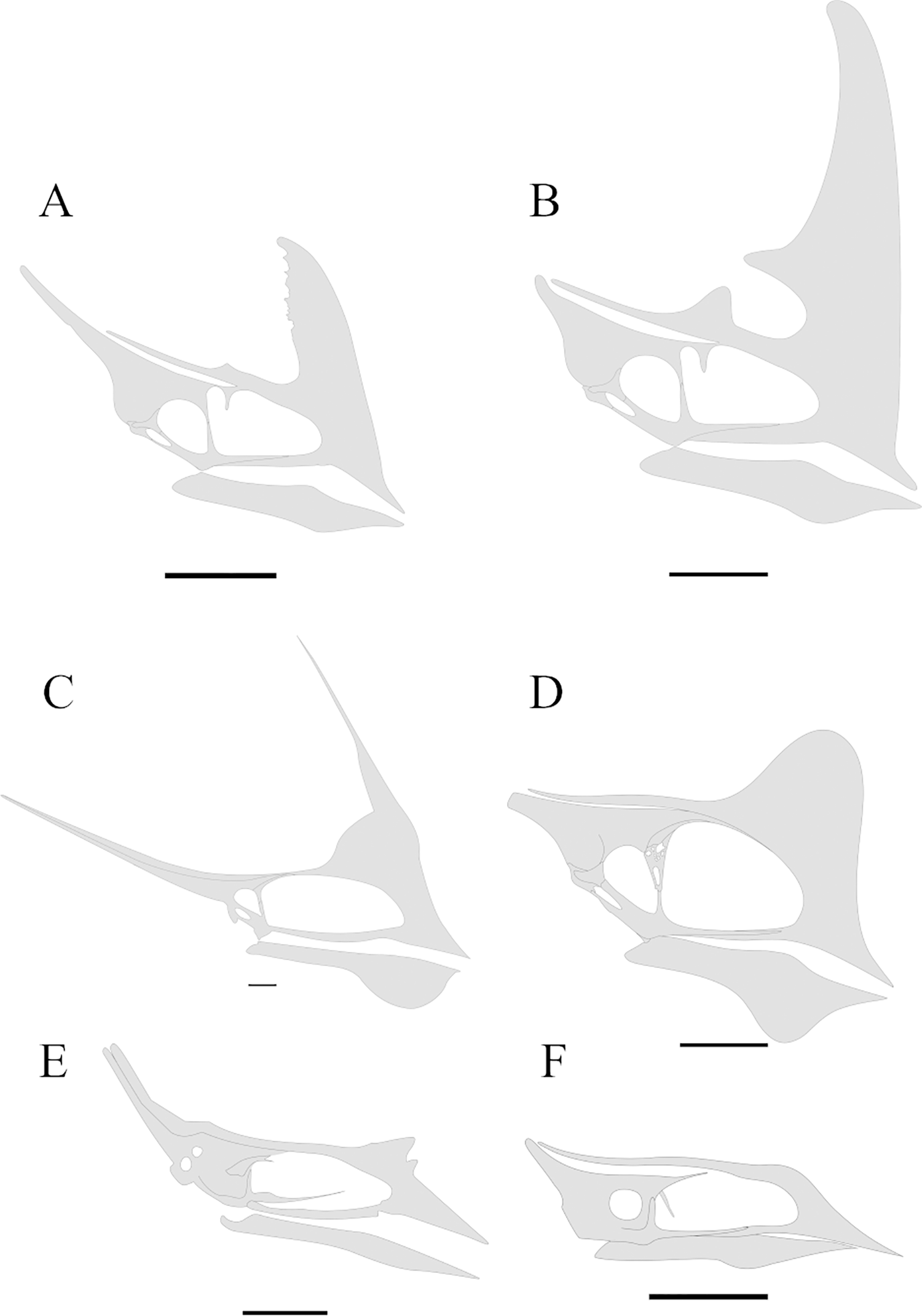
- Collection of various tapejarid skulls to scale with one another. From left to right, top to bottom: Torukjara bandeirae, Caiuajara dobruskii, Tupandactylus imperator, Tapejara wellnhoferi, Huaxiadraco corollatus, and Sinopterus dongi

Scientific classification
- Kingdom: Animalia
- Phylum: Chordata
- Class: Reptilia
- Order: †Pterosauria
- Suborder: †Pterodactyloidea
- Clade: †Azhdarchoidea
- Clade: †Tapejaromorpha
- Family: †Tapejaridae; Kellner, 1989

Type species
- †Tapejara wellnhoferi Kellner, 1989

Genera
- †Bakonydraco?; †Thalassodrominae?; †Caupedactylia? Pêgas et al., 2023; †Aymberedactylus; †Caupedactylus; †Sinopterinae Lü et al., 2016; †Afrotapejara; †Eopteranodon; †Hintighernia; †Huaxiadraco; †Sinopterus; †Wightia; †Tapejarinae Kellner & Campos, 2007; †Europejara; †Vectidraco; †Tapejarini Andres et al., 2014; †Tapejara; †Tupandactylus; †Caiuajarina Pêgas, 2024; †Caiuajara; †Torukjara

Synonyms
- Eutapejaria? Pêgas et al., 2023

= Tapejaridae =

Tapejarids Temporal range: Early to Late Cretaceous, 125–94 Ma

Family of azhdarchoid pterosaurs from the Cretaceous period

Tapejaridae (from a Tupi word meaning 'the lord of the ways') is a family of azhdarchoid pterosaurs from the Cretaceous period. Members are currently known from Africa, Asia, Europe, South America and possibly North America. The most primitive genera were found in China, indicating that the family has an Asian origin.

== Description ==
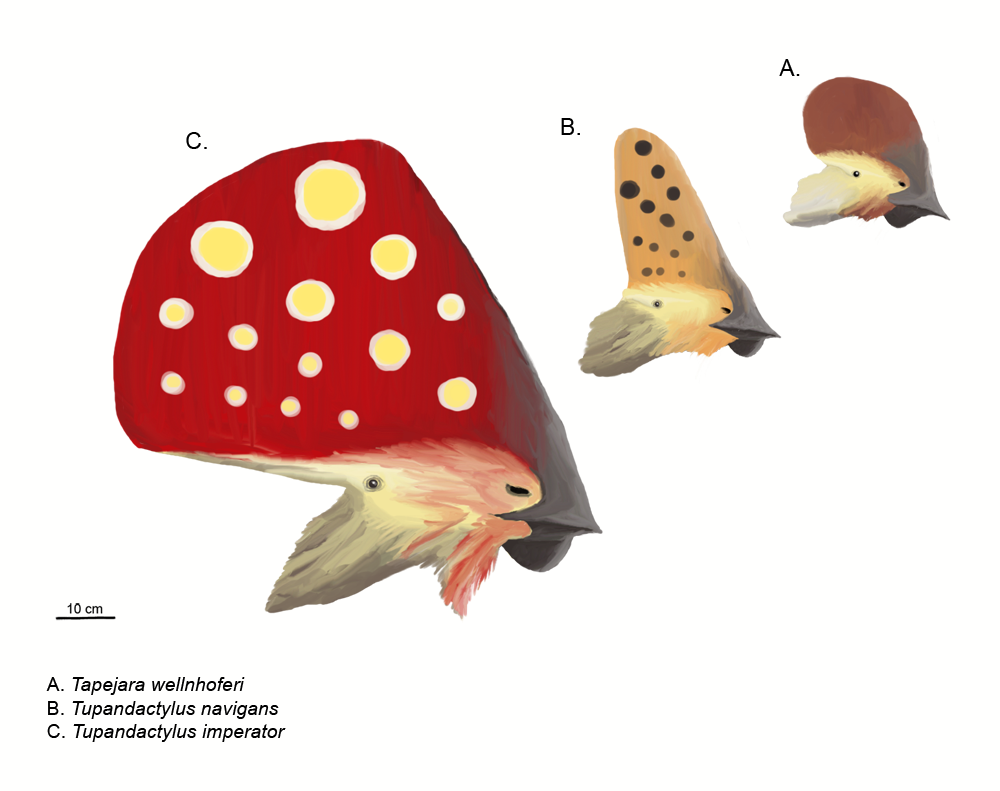
Reconstructed profiles of three Brazilian species; from top to bottom, Tapejara wellnhoferi (A), Tupandactylus navigans (B), and Tupandactylus imperator (C)

Tapejarids were small to medium-sized pterosaurs with several unique, shared characteristics, mainly relating to the skull. Most tapejarids possessed a bony crest arising from the snout (formed mostly by the premaxillary bones of the upper jaw tip). In some species, this bony crest is known to have supported an even larger crest of softer, fibrous tissue that extends back along the skull. Tapejarids are also characterized by their large nasoantorbital fenestra, the main opening in the skull in front of the eyes, which spans at least half the length of the entire skull in this family. Their eye sockets were small and pear-shaped. Studies of tapejarid brain cases show that they had extremely good vision, more so than in other pterosaur groups, and probably relied nearly exclusively on vision when hunting or interacting with other members of their species. Tapejarids had unusually reduced shoulder girdles that would have been slung low on the torso, resulting in wings that protruded from near the belly rather than near the back, a "bottom decker" arrangement reminiscent of some planes.

== Biology ==
Tapejarids appear to have been arboreal, having more curved claws than other azhdarchoid pterosaurs and occurring more commonly in fossil sites with other arboreal flying vertebrates such as early birds. Tapejarids have long been speculated as having been frugivores or omnivores, based on their parrot-like beaks. Direct evidence for plant-eating is known in a specimen of Sinopterus that preserves phytoliths and gastroliths in the abdominal cavity.

== Classification ==
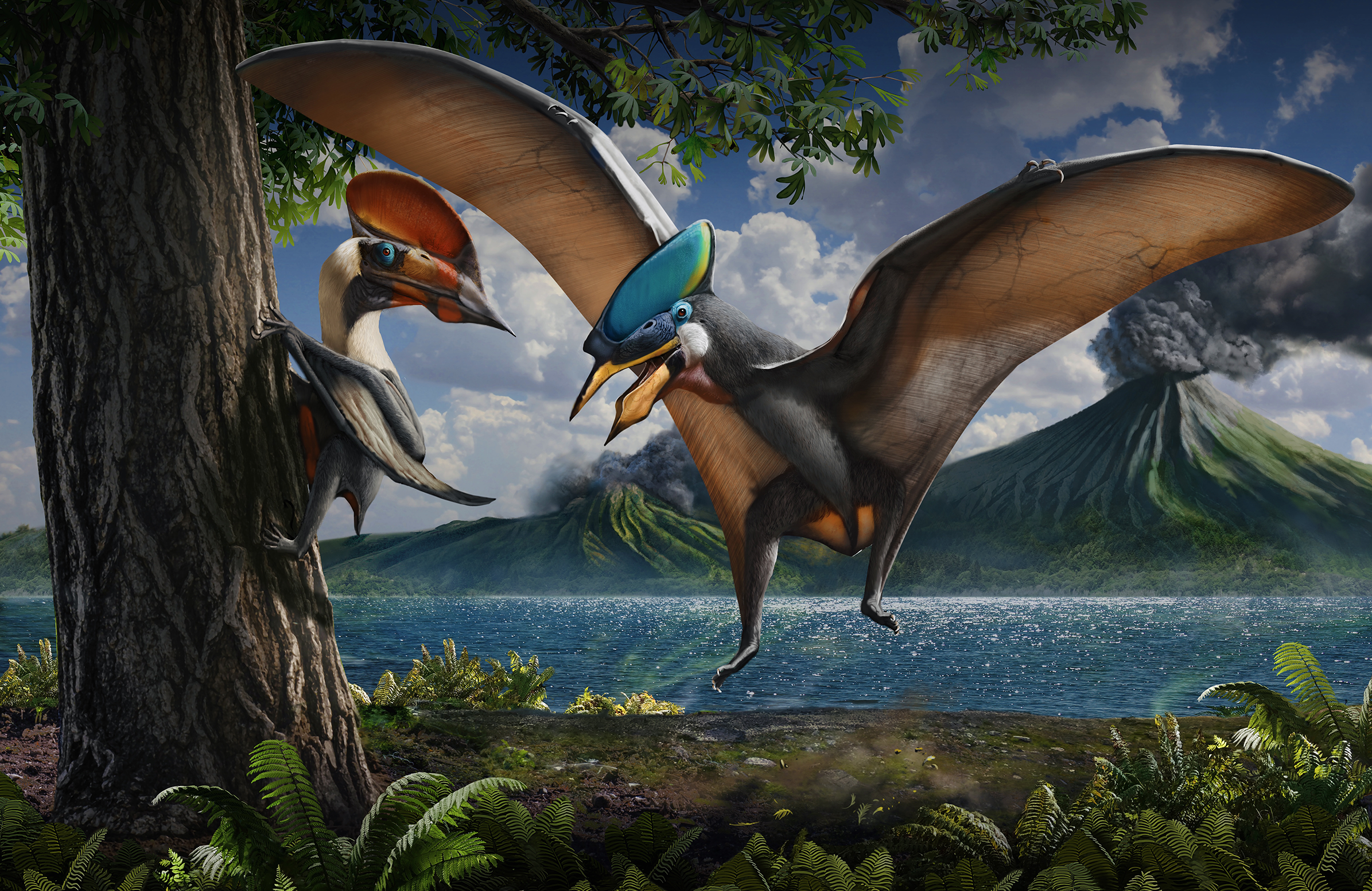
Life restorations of sinopterines Huaxiadraco and Sinopterus

Tapejaridae was named and defined by Brazilian paleontologist Alexander Kellner in 1989 as the clade containing both Tapejara and Tupuxuara, plus all descendants of their most recent common ancestor. In 2007, Kellner divided the family: Tapejarinae, consisting of Tapejara and its close relatives, and Thalassodrominae, consisting of Thalassodromeus and Tupuxuara. A 2011 study subsumed the family Chaoyangopteridae as the subfamily Chaoyangopterinae, something not followed by future authors. Kellner's concept of a Tapejaridae consisting of Tapejarinae and Thalassodrominae would be the basis for numerous subsequent phylogenetic analyses.

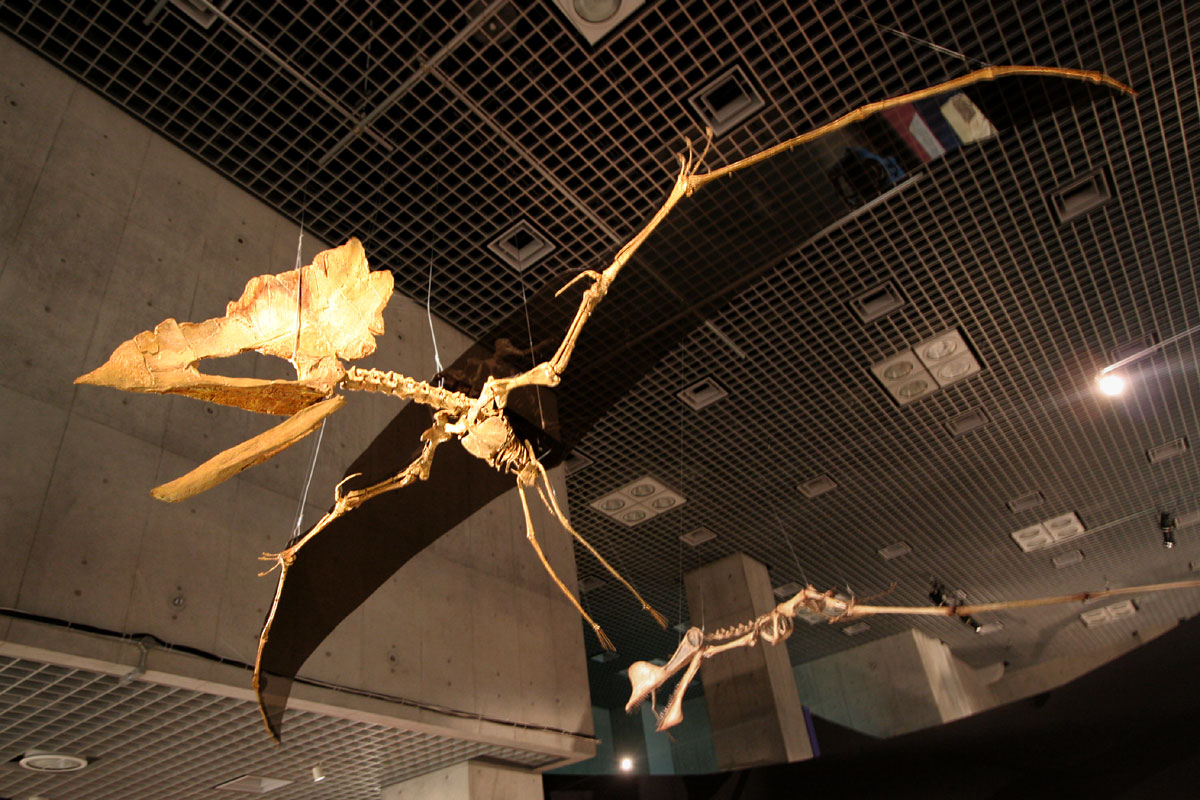
Skeletal reconstructions of Thalassodromeus, phylogenetically controversial pterosaurs classically assigned to Tapejaridae

Various opposing studies have arose challenging Kellner's concept of Tapejaridae. The 2003 model of paleontologist David Unwin found Tupuxara and Thalassodromeus to be more distantly related to Tapejara and therefore outside of Tapejaridae, instead being related to Azhdarchidae. Later, in 2006, British paleontologists David Martill and Darren Naish followed Unwin's concept, and provided a revised definition for Tapejaridae was also proposed: the clade containing all species more closely related to Tapejara than to Quetzalcoatlus. A 2008 study by Lü Junchang and colleagues also corroborated this model, and used the term "Tupuxuaridae" to include both genera. In 2009, British paleontologist Mark Witton also agreed with the Unwin model. However, he noted that the term Thalassodrominae was created before Tupuxuaridae, meaning it had naming priority. He elevated Thalassodrominae to family level, thus creating the denomination Thalassodromidae.

Regarding the core tapejarid clade, American paleontologist Brian Andres and colleagues formally defined Tapejaridae as the clade containing Tapejara and Sinopterus in 2014. They also re-defined the subfamily Tapejarinae as all species closer to Tapejara than to Sinopterus, and added a new clade, Tapejarini, to include all descendants of the last common ancestor of Tapejara and Tupandactylus. In 2020, in the description of the genus Wightia, an opposing subfamily was named, Sinopterinae, consisting of tapejarids more closely related to Sinopterus than Tapejara. These studies follow the Unwin model, opposing Kellner's model of Tapejaridae while corroborating the close relationship between thalassodromids, azhdarchids, rather than tapejarids.

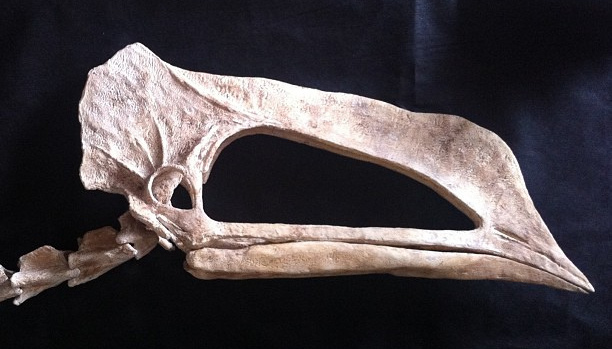
Reconstructed skull of Caupedactylus, a pterosaur recovered either within Tapejarinae or just outside Tapejaridae in its own clade, Caupedactylia

In 2023, paleontologist Rodrigo Pêgas and colleagues argued that despite the disagreements about the position of Thalassodromeus and its relatives, the species in question were consistently related. Therefore, they favored the term Thalassodromidae to have consistency with other studies that used the same name, despite finding them to form a natural grouping with Tapejaridae in their phylogenetic analysis (per the Kellner model). Thus, Thalassodromidae and Tapejaridae would be separate families within Tapejaromorpha. In their 2023 study, Pêgas and colleagues redefined Tapejaridae to be the most recent common ancestor of Sinopterus, Tapejara, and Caupedactylus in order to preserve the scope of the family in light of finding Caupedactylus, traditionally a tapejarine, outside of the Andres definition of Tapejaridae. They divided this redefined Tapejaridae into the groups Eutapejaria, containing the subfamilies Sinopterinae and Tapejarinae, and Caupedactylia, containing the pterosaurs Caupedactylus and Aymberedactylus. In 2024, Pêgas rejected this redefinition of Tapejaridae in light of non-compliance with phylocode rules, applying the Tapejara and Sinopterus definition and deeming Eutapejaria a synonym. Instead, he created the larger group contain Tapejaridae and Caupedactylia, removing Caupedactylus and Aymberedactylus from the family itself.

The cladogram below shows the phylogenetic analysis conducted by paleontologist Gabriela Cerqueira and colleagues in 2021, which uses Kellner's nomenclature of Tapejaridae.

- Tapejaridae
  - Thalassodrominae
    - Thalassodromeus sethi
    - - Kariridraco dianae
      - - Tupuxuara leonardii
        - Tupuxuara longicristatus
  - Tapejarinae
    - Caupedactylus ybaka
    - - Aymberedactylus cearensis
      - - - Eopteranodon lii
          - Huaxiapterus benxiensis
          - Huaxiapterus corollatus
          - Sinopterus dongi
        - Tapejarini
          - Tapejara wellnhoferi
          - Europejara olcadesorum
          - Caiuajara dobruskii
          - Tupandactylus imperator

Below are two cladograms representing different concepts of Tapejaridae. The first one shows the phylogenetic analysis conducted by Andres in 2021, in which Tapejaridae consists of the subfamilies Tapejarinae and Sinopterinae. He found the pterosaurs Lacusovagus and Keresdrakon as tapejarines, an arrangement that had never been recovered in previous analyses. Regarding the interrelationships of Tapejaridae, Andres follows Unwin's concept. The second cladogram shows the phylogenetic analysis conducted by Pêgas in 2024. He also found Tapejaridae to consist of both Tapejarinae and Sinopterinae, but differed from Andres in recovering the tapejarid Bakonydraco as a sinopterine instead of tapejarine. He created the new subtribe Caiuajarina within Tapejarini to include Caiuajara and Torukjara. Additionally, his analysis further differs from that of Andres in finding both Tapejaridae and Thalassodromidae within Tapejaromorpha, which corroborates the close relationship between thalassodromids and tapejarids, similar to Kellner.

Topology 1: Andres (2021).

- Azhdarchoidea
  - Neoazhdarchia
  - Tapejaridae
    - Sinopterinae
      - - Huaxiapterus jii
        - Eopteranodon lii
      - - Sinopterus dongi
        - - Sinopterus benxiensis
          - Sinopterus corollatus
    - Tapejarinae
      - - Lacusovagus magnificens
        - - Bakonydraco galaczi
          - Keresdrakon vilsoni
      - Tapejarini
        - - Tapejara wellnhoferi
          - Europejara olcadesorum
          - Vectidraco daisymorrisae
        - - Caiuajara dobruskii
          - - Tupandactylus navigans
            - Tupandactylus imperator

Topology 2: Pêgas (2024).

- Tapejaromorpha
  - Thalassodromidae
  - Tapejariformes
    - Caupedactylia
      - Aymberedactylus cearensis
      - Caupedactylus ybaka
    - Tapejaridae
      - Tapejarinae
        - Europejara olcadesorum
        - - - Tupandactylus imperator
            - Tupandactylus navigans
          - - Tapejara wellnhoferi
            - Caiuajarina
              - Caiuajara dobruskii
              - Torukjara bandeirae
      - Sinopterinae
        - - Huaxiadraco corollatus
          - - Eopteranodon lii
            - Sinopterus dongi
        - - Wightia declivirostris
          - - Afrotapejara zouhri
            - Bakonydraco galaczi

== Subclades ==
Summary of the phylogenetic definitions of tapejarid subclades as discussed in the classification section.

Name	Named by	Definition	Notes
Caiuajarina	Pêgas, 2024	The largest clade containing Caiuajara dobruskii, but not Tapejara wellnhoferi.	
Caupedactylia	Pêgas et al., 2023	The largest clade containing Caupedactylus ybaka, but not Tapejara wellnhoferi.	May be within Tapejaridae or just outside in the broader clade Tapejariformes.
Eutapejaria	Pêgas et al., 2023	The largest clade containing Tapejara wellnhoferi, but not Caupedactylus ybaka.	May be synonymous with Tapejaridae when Caupedactylia is outside of Tapejaridae.
Sinopterinae	Lü et al., 2016	The largest clade containing Sinopterus dongi, but not Tapejara wellnhoferi.	
Tapejaridae	Kellner, 1989	The smallest clade containing Tapejara wellnhoferi and Sinopterus dongi.	Has had multiple interpretations of how inclusive the family is. Originally including Tapejara and relatives along with Thalassodromeus and relatives, then the last common ancestor and all descendants of Tapejara and Sinopterus, and most recently proposed as the last common ancestor Caupedactylus, Tapejara, and Sinopterus. The second interpretation is the currently most followed convention.
Tapejariformes	Pêgas, 2024	The clade characterized by a downturned rostrum synapomorphic with that of Tapejara	May be synonymous with Tapejaridae if Caupedactylus is a tapejarid.
Tapejarinae	Kellner & Campos, 2007	The largest clade containing Tapejara wellnhoferi, but not Sinopterus dongi.	Has been historically treated as one of two subfamilies (the other being Thalassodrominae) in Tapejaridae. More recently, it is treated as one of the two main subfamilies along with Sinopterinae.
Tapejarini	Andres et al., 2014	The smallest clade containing Tapejara wellnhoferi and Tupandactylus imperator	
