= Wightia declivirostris =

Wightia Temporal range: Early Cretaceous, Barremian

Scientific classification
- Kingdom: Animalia
- Phylum: Chordata
- Class: Reptilia
- Order: †Pterosauria
- Suborder: †Pterodactyloidea
- Clade: †Azhdarchoidea
- Family: †Tapejaridae
- Subfamily: †Sinopterinae
- Genus: †Wightia; Martill et al., 2020
- Species: †W. declivirostris

Binomial name
- †Wightia declivirostris Martill et al., 2020

Genus of tapejarid pterosaur from the Early Cretaceous

Wightia is a genus of tapejarid pterosaur recovered from the Lower Cretaceous (Barremian) aged Wessex Formation of the Isle of Wight of England, from which it gets its name. The only species within this genus is W. declivirostris.

== Discovery and naming ==
Amateur paleontologist John Winch discovered a pterosaur snout at the east coast of Wight, near the cliff of Yaverland Point at Sandown, in a fossil plant debris layer. In 2020, the type species Wightia declivirostris was named and described by David Michael Martill, Mick Green, Roy Smith, Megan Jacobs and John Winch. The generic name Wightia comes from the Isle of Wight in England where the fossil was found. The specific name means "slanting beak" in Latin, from declivis, "inclining downwards", and rostrum, "snout", referring to the snout kink typical of tapejarids.

The holotype, IWCSM. 2020. 401, was found in a layer of the Wessex Formation dating from the Barremian. It consists of partial paired praemaxillae, lacking the snout tip and broken off at the rear before the front edge of the fenestra nasoantorbitalis. The fossil is lightly eroded, transversely compressed and deformed. It is part of the collection of the Museum of Isle of Wight Geology (Dinosaur Isle Visitor Centre).

== Description ==
The species is solely known from the premaxilla. Martill e.a. indicated some distinguishing traits. The occlusal surface (palate) of the snout is pierced by only a limited number of slit-like foramina combined with a single row of foramina parallel to and close to the jaw edge and positioned far apart, at about one opening per centimetre. The snout is appending under an angle of 12°.

== Phylogeny ==
The morphology of the occlusal margin suggests closer affinities of Wightia with Sinopterus than with the South American tapejarids. The describers place the two, including Eopteranodon and Huaxiapterus, in a newly named subfamily of tapejarids called Sinopterinae.

== Palaeoecology ==
Wightia inhabited the area presented by southern England's Wessex Formation, at the time a floodplain. The formation contains an abundance of insects like Dungeyella. Herbivores ranged from small mammals like Eobaatar, Loxaulax and Yaverlestes to ornithopods, themselves ranging from the small Hypsilophodon to large iguanodonts like Mantellisaurus. The largest predators of the area and time were the spinosaurid Baryonyx and the allosauroid Neovenator, as well as the basal tyrannosaur Eotyrannus.
