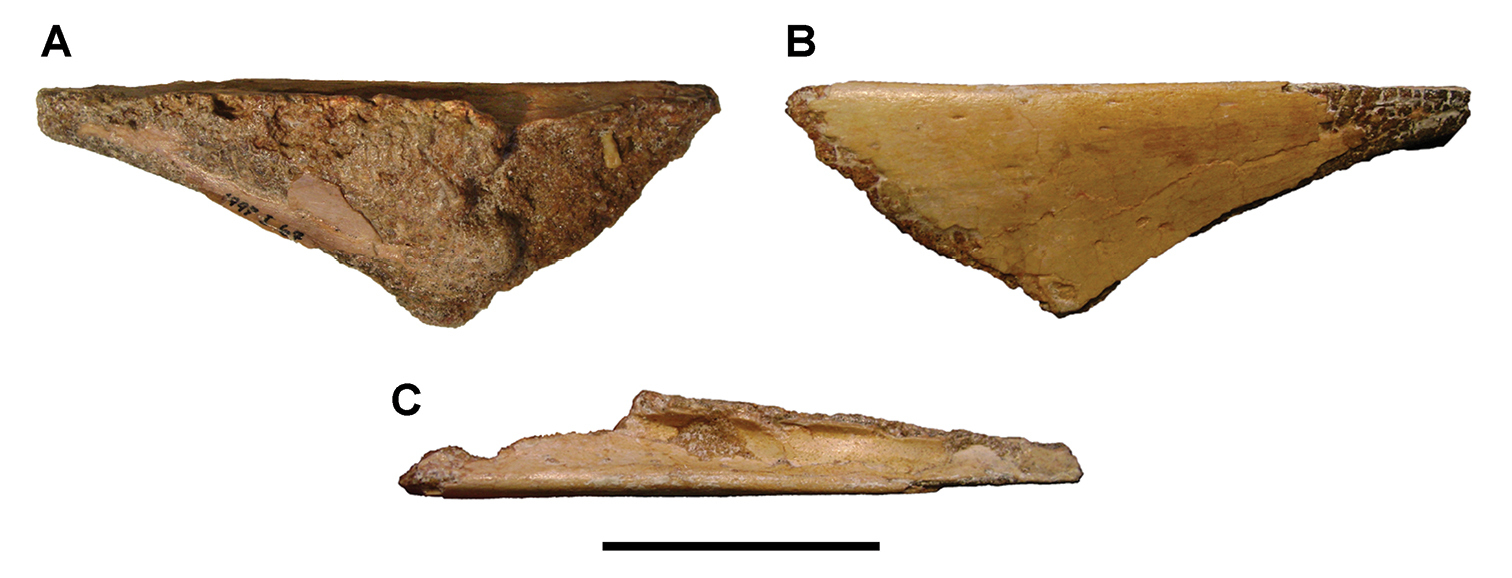
- Assigned mandibular symphysis BSP 1997 I 67

Scientific classification
- Kingdom: Animalia
- Phylum: Chordata
- Class: Reptilia
- Order: †Pterosauria
- Suborder: †Pterodactyloidea
- Clade: †Azhdarchoidea
- Family: †Tapejaridae
- Genus: †Afrotapejara; Martill et al., 2020

Type species
- †Afrotapejara zouhri Martill et al., 2020

= Afrotapejara =

Afrotapejara Temporal range: Late Cretaceous, Cenomanian

Genus of tapejarid pterosaur from the Late Cretaceous period

Afrotapejara (meaning "African old being") is an extinct genus of tapejarid pterosaur discovered in Morocco. The type species, Afrotapejara zouhri, was named and described in 2020. It was the first tapejarid discovered in Africa and the fourth pterosaur discovered in the Kem Kem Beds.

== Discovery ==
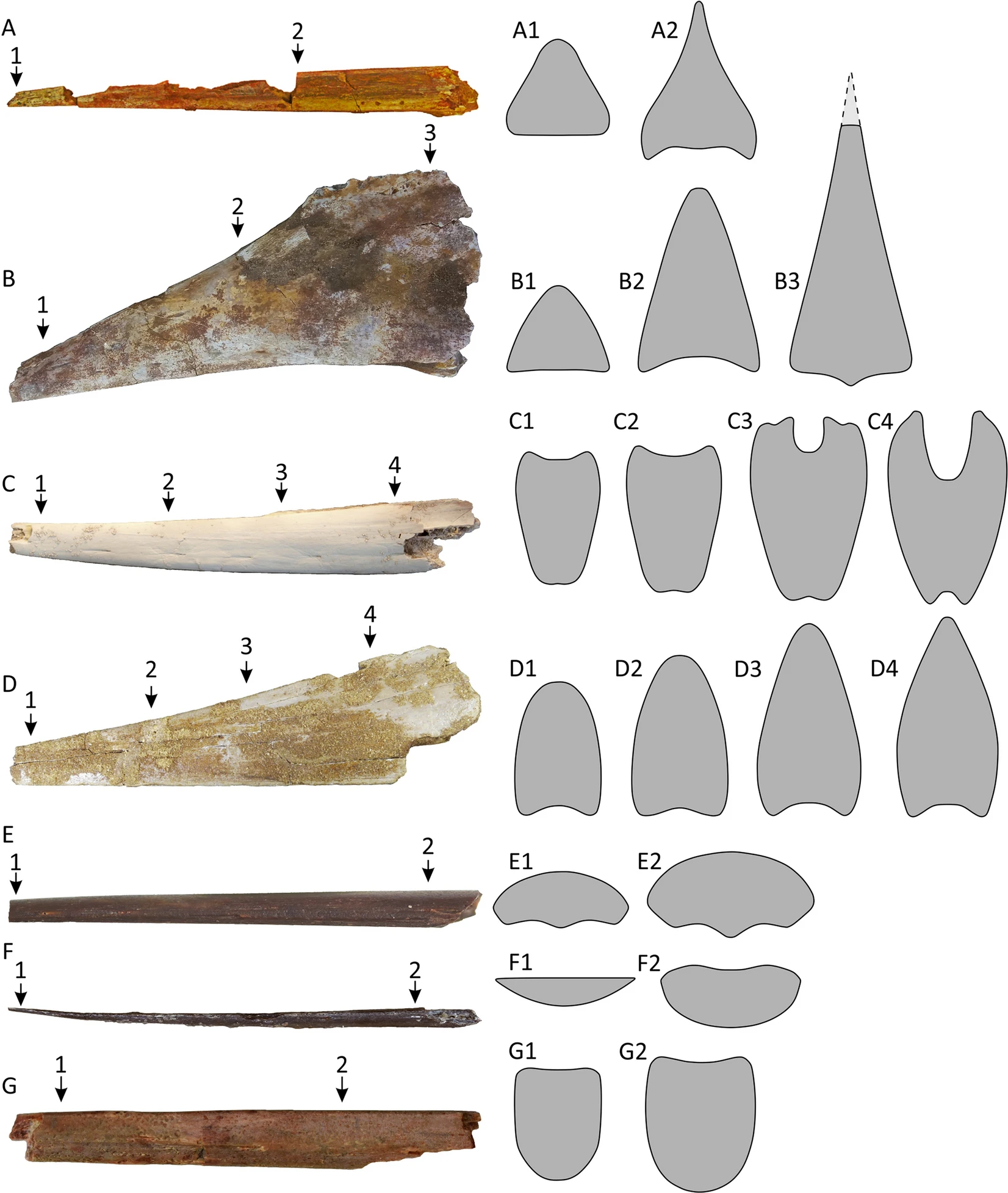
Comparison of Kem Kem pterosaurs, B is the Afrotapejara holotype

British paleontologist David Michael Martill acquired a pterosaur jaw from a fossil trader at Erfoud. It would have been excavated at the plateau of Ikhf N’ Taqmout, in Tafilalt.

In 2020, the type species Afrotapejara zouhri was named and described by David Martill, Roy Smith, David M. Unwin, Alexander Kao, James McPhee and Nizar Ibrahim. The generic name combines references to Africa and the related genus Tapejara. The specific name honours the Moroccan paleontologist Samir Zouhri.

The holotype, FSAC-KK 5004, had been found in the Kem-Kem Beds, dating from the Albian - early Cenomanian. It consists of a snout lacking the front tip and extending to behind to a position below the front of the snout crest. The piece had already been prepared by the fossil traders. Subsequent preparation by Martill, as well as a CT scan, showed that a bone fragment from some other taxon had been used to repair damage to the upper edge. Martill deposited the fossil in the collection of the Département de Géologie (Paléontologie), Faculté des Sciences Aïn Chock.

Two additional fossils were referred to the species: the specimens FSAC-KK 5006 and FSAC-KK 5007. These are snouts also, with a similar provenance, and showing an almost identical build. Specimen BSP 1997 I 67, a symphysis of the lower jaws described in 1999, was provisionally referred. It too, had been found in the Red Beds of the Moroccan Kem-Kem.

== Description ==
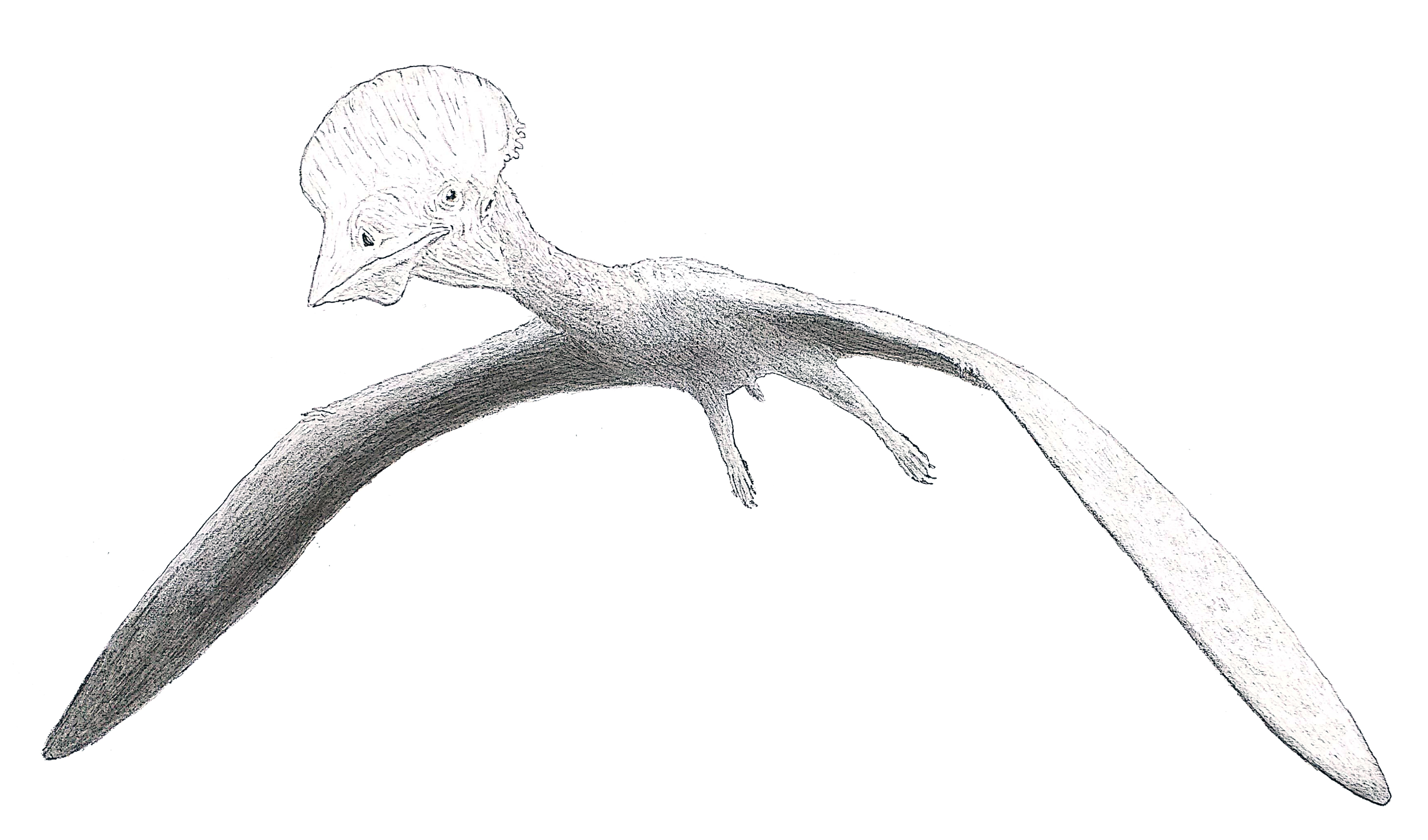
Restoration

Afrotapejara is distinguished from all other tapejarids by the possession of a dorsal (upwards) expansion of the rostral (front) margin a short distance from the rostral tip. Additionally, a unique combination is present of two traits that in themselves are not unique. The side of the snout shows a row of small elongated openings close to and parallel to the edge shared with the palate. The palate shows a small boss at the rear, on the midline.
