= Tapejara =

Tapejara may refer to:

- Tapejara wellnhoferi, a species of pterosaur
- Tapejara, Rio Grande do Sul
- Tapejara, Paraná
