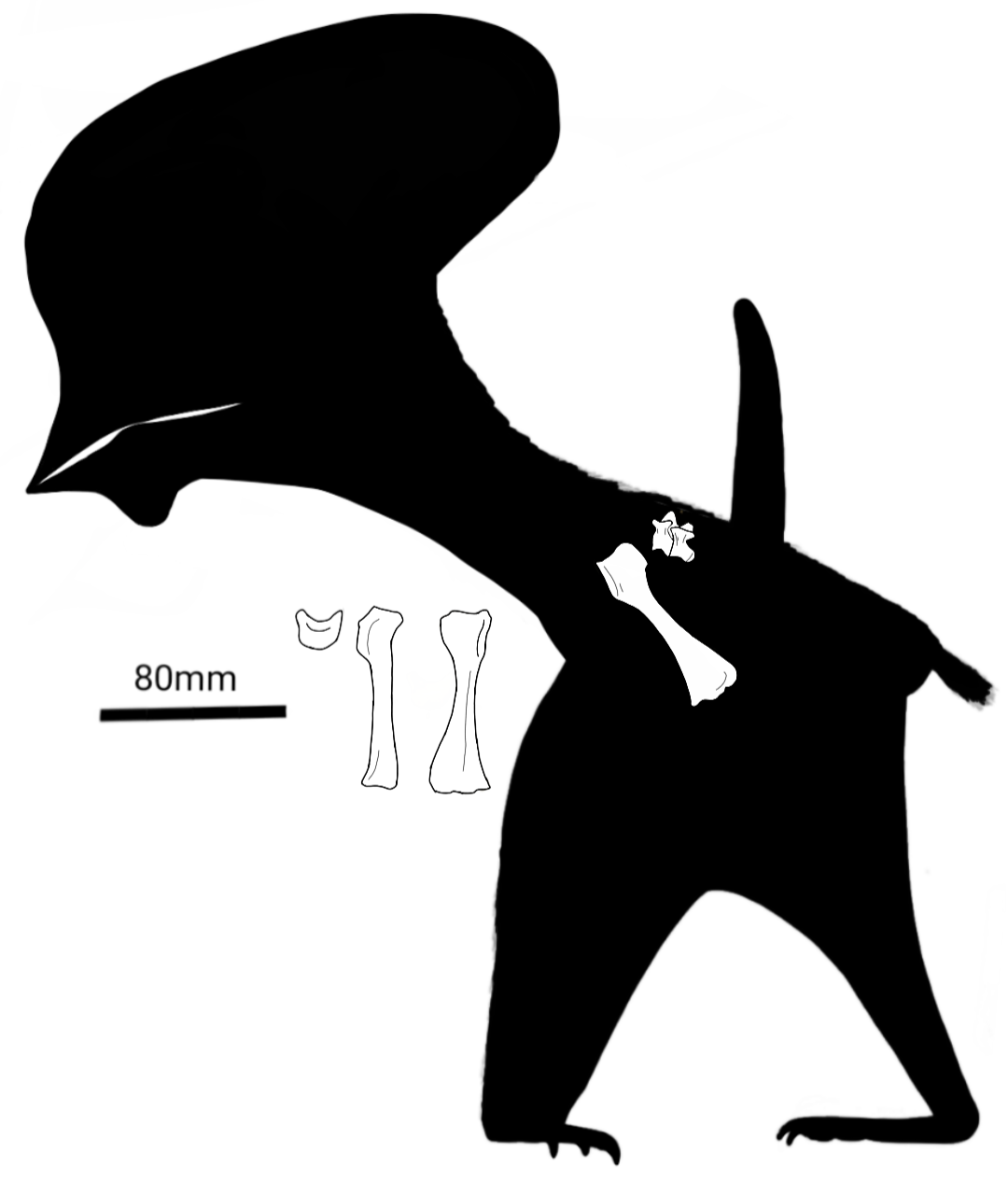
- Skeletal diagram of Bennettazhia oregonensis

Scientific classification
- Kingdom: Animalia
- Phylum: Chordata
- Class: Reptilia
- Order: †Pterosauria
- Suborder: †Pterodactyloidea
- Clade: †Azhdarchoidea
- Clade: †Tapejaromorpha
- Genus: †Bennettazhia; Nessov, 1991

Type species
- †Pteranodon oregonensis Gilmore, 1928

Species
- †B. oregonensis (Gilmore, 1928)

Synonyms
- Pteranodon oregonensis Gilmore, 1928

= Bennettazhia =

Bennettazhia Temporal range: Albian 103 Ma

Genus of tapejaromorph pterosaur from the Early Cretaceous

Bennettazhia is a genus of tapejaromorph pterosaur which lived during the Albian stage of the Early Cretaceous from what is now the Hudspeth Formation of the state of Oregon in the United States. Although originally identified as a species of the pteranodontoid pterosaur Pteranodon, Bennettazhia is now thought to have been a different animal. The type and only species is B. oregonensis.

== Discovery and history ==
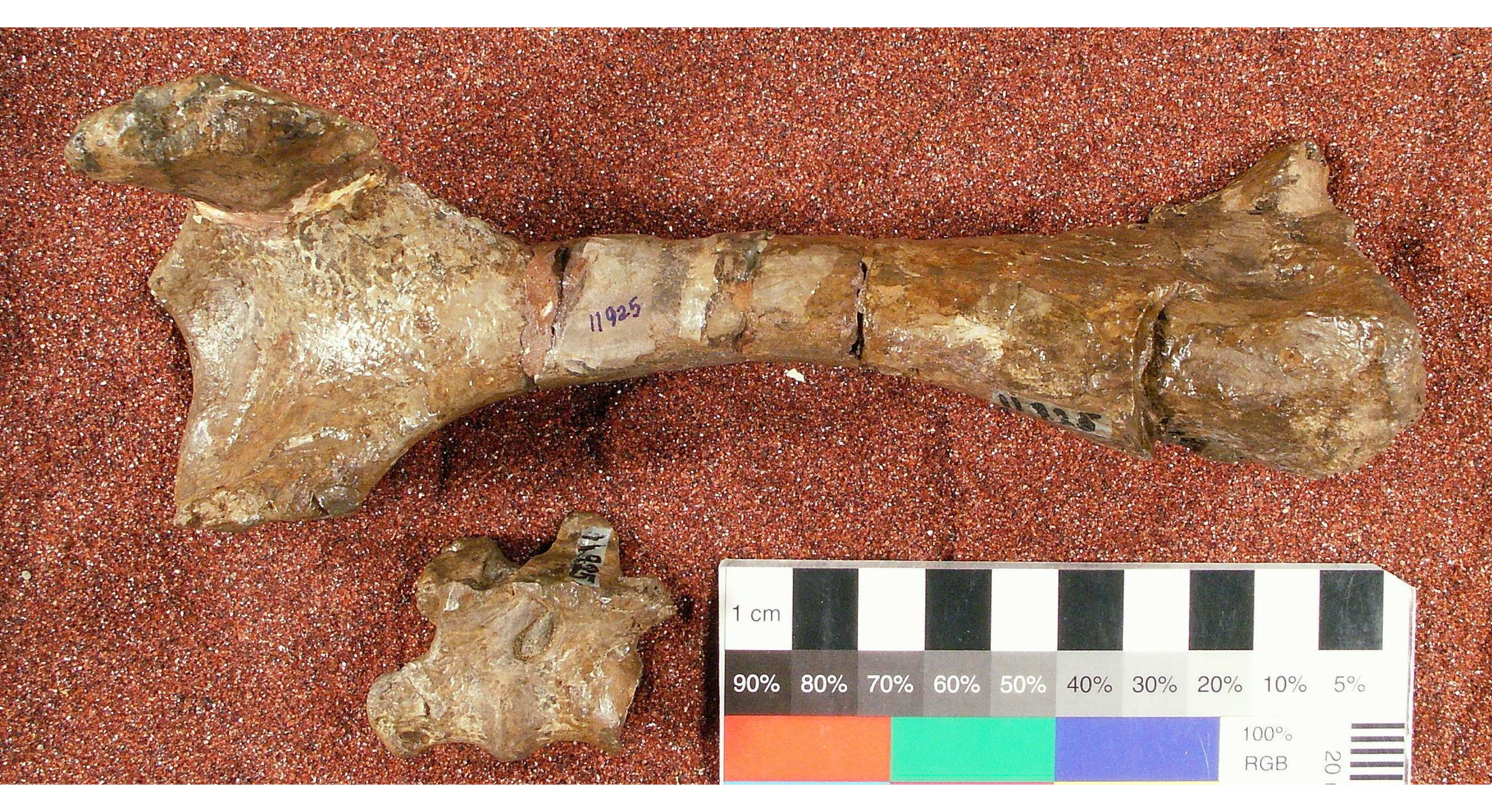
Elements of the holotype

In 1928, Charles Gilmore named a new species of Pteranodon: P. oregonensis. A humerus (holotype MPUC V.126713), two fused dorsal vertebrae and the broken-off end of some joint bone had been unearthed from the Lower Cretaceous (Albian stage) beds of the Hudspeth Formation in Wheeler County, Oregon, United States, to which the specific epithet refers. Gilmore noted similarities to Nyctosaurus though the specimens were larger.

In 1989, S. Christopher Bennett concluded that the remains might be those of a member of the Azhdarchidae instead of a pteranodontid. In 1991, Russian paleontologist Lev Nessov therefore named a new azhdarchid genus: Bennettazhia. The genus name honors Bennett and combines his name with Persian azhdarha, "dragon", a reference to Azhdarcho, the type genus of the Azhdarchidae. Bennett himself in 1994 changed his opinion and stated that it belonged to the Dsungaripteridae. Since then, some authors including Bennett himself have classified this genus as a sister group to the Tapejaridae or possibly a member of the Thalassodrominae.

In 2023, the discovery of guano and unusual fragmentation of ammonites from the Hudspeth Formation have been interpreted as evidence that this pterosaur ate molluscs and formed large colonies on nearby cliffs similar to modern seagull rookeries. New remains of this pterosaur are also reported, including two isolated teeth (F127985A and F127910B) and an edentulous (teeth-lacking) section of the lower mandible (F127960). However, in 2025, it was noted that these remains were referred to Bennettazhia without any overlap with the holotype specimen. These specimens were considered to be material of a dsungaripteromorph, representing a distinct taxon from Bennettazhia.

== Description ==
Bennettazhia was a medium-sized pterosaur with an estimated wingspan of 4 metres (13 ft). In 2007, American biologist Michael Habib revealed the result of a study by CAT-scan of the type specimen of Bennettazhia. The humerus, 183 millimeters (7.2 in) long, is uncrushed, which is uncommon for a pterosaur fossil and therefore offered a rare opportunity to investigate the bone structure. Apart from the thin bone wall, the humerus was filled with a spongy tissue consisting of trabeculae, very thin bone layers and struts, forming a light yet strong construction. Habib inferred that such strength would have allowed even very large pterosaurs to launch themselves from the ground using their forelimbs. The same investigation made a better classification possible. The humerus has an elongated deltopectoral crest that is unwarped. Both dsungaripterids and azhdarchoids show this feature, but only the latter group is typified by such a very thin outer bone wall. Habib concluded that Bennettazhia was a member of the Azhdarchoidea, a more encompassing group than the Azhdarchidae.

== Classification ==
The cladogram below follows a 2014 phylogenetic analysis by Brian Andres and colleagues. In the analysis, they placed Bennettazhia within the clade Tapejaromorpha, as the basalmost member.

- Azhdarchoidea
  - Neoazhdarchia
  - Tapejaromorpha
    - Bennettazhia oregonensis
    - - - Eopteranodon lii
        - - "Sinopterus" gui
          - Nemicolopterus crypticus
      - - Huaxiapterus jii
        - Tapejaridae
          - Sinopterus dongi
          - Tapejarinae
            - - "Huaxiapterus" benxiensis
              - "Huaxiapterus" corollatus
            - Tapejarini
              - - Tupandactylus navigans
                - Tupandactylus imperator
              - - Bakonydraco galaczi
                - - Europejara olcadesorum
                  - Tapejara wellnhoferi

In 2025, a comprehensive analysis of azhdarchoid pterosaurs recovered Bennettazhia within the Caupedactylia, closely related to Aymberedactylus and Caupedactylus within the Tapejariformes.

== See also ==
- Timeline of pterosaur research
- List of pterosaurs
