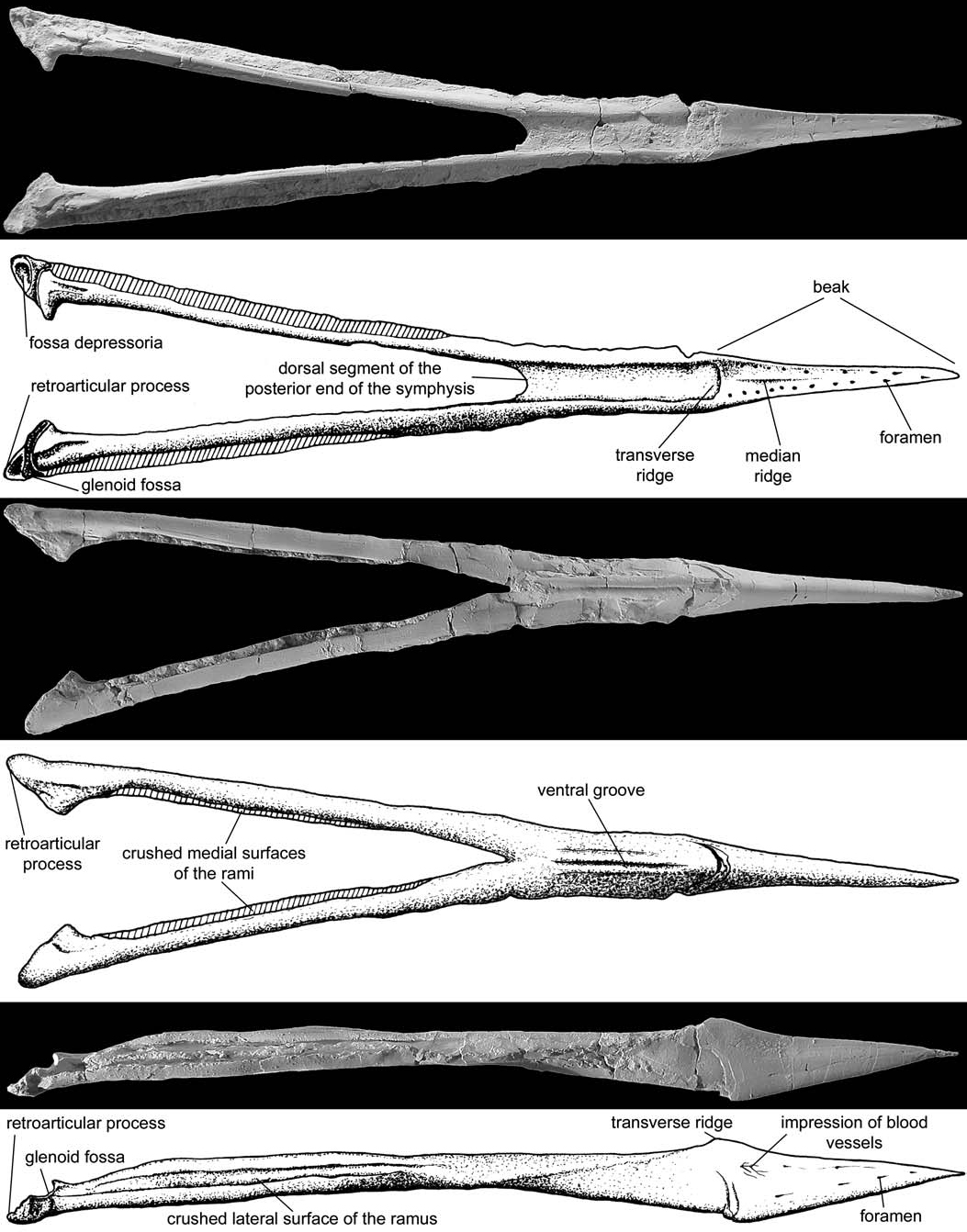
- Holotype fossil

Scientific classification
- Kingdom: Animalia
- Phylum: Chordata
- Order: †Pterosauria
- Suborder: †Pterodactyloidea
- Clade: †Azhdarchoidea
- Genus: †Bakonydraco; Ősi, Weishampel & Jianu, 2005
- Species: †B. galaczi

Binomial name
- †Bakonydraco galaczi Ősi, Weishampel & Jianu, 2005

= Bakonydraco =

Bakonydraco Temporal range: Late Cretaceous, Santonian

Genus of azhdarchoid pterosaur

Bakonydraco is a genus of azhdarchoid pterosaur from the Late Cretaceous period (Santonian stage) of what is now the Csehbánya Formation of the Bakony Mountains, Iharkút, Veszprém, western Hungary.

== Etymology ==
Bakonydraco was named in 2005 by paleontologists Attila Ősi, David Weishampel, and Jianu Coralia. The type species is Bakonydraco galaczi. The genus name refers to the Bakony Mountains and to Latin draco, "dragon". The specific epithet galaczi honors Professor András Galácz, who helped the authors in the Iharkút Research Program, where fossils are since 2000 found in open-pit mining of bauxite, among them the remains of pterosaurs, the first ever discovered in Hungary.

== Description ==
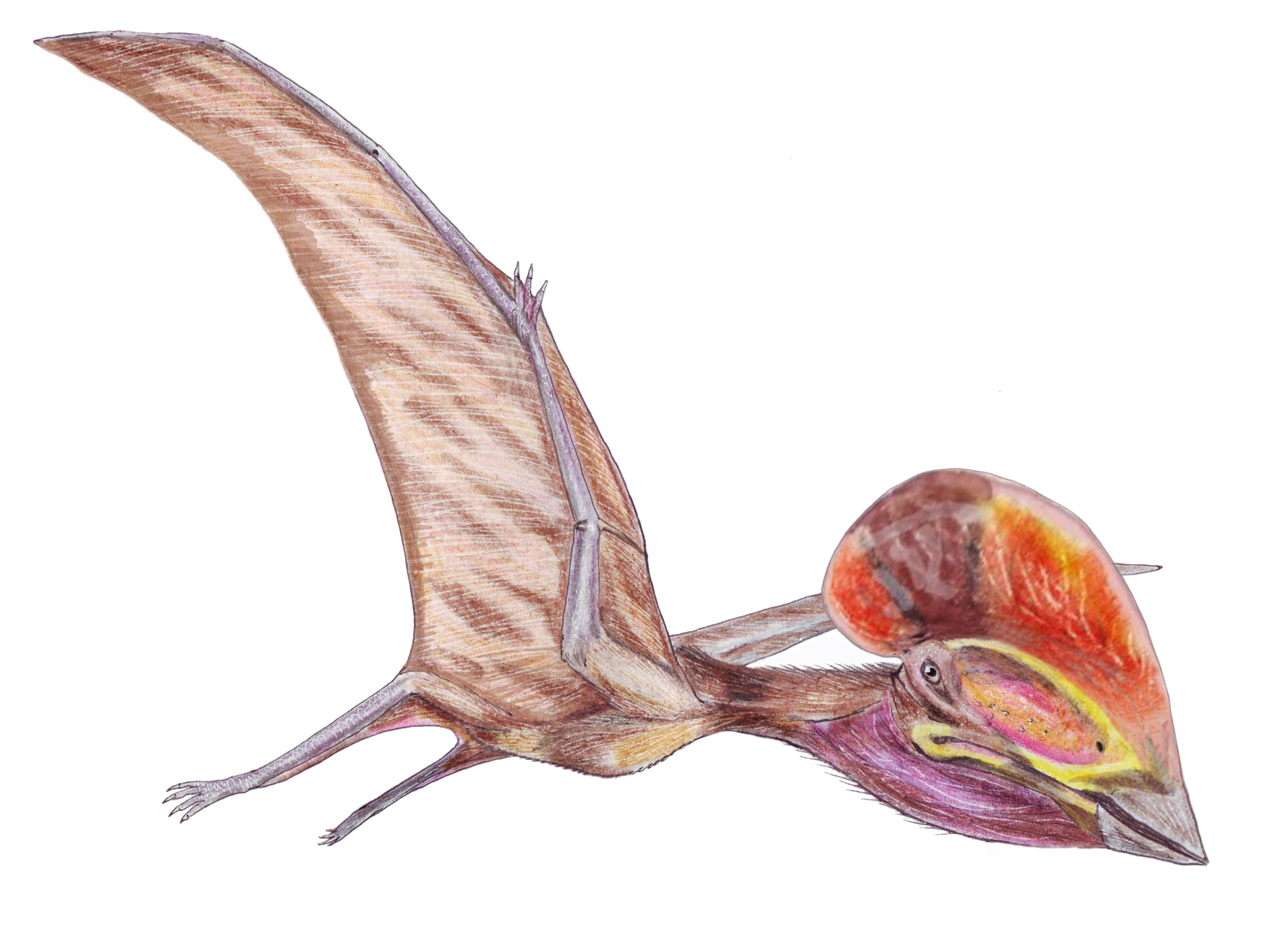

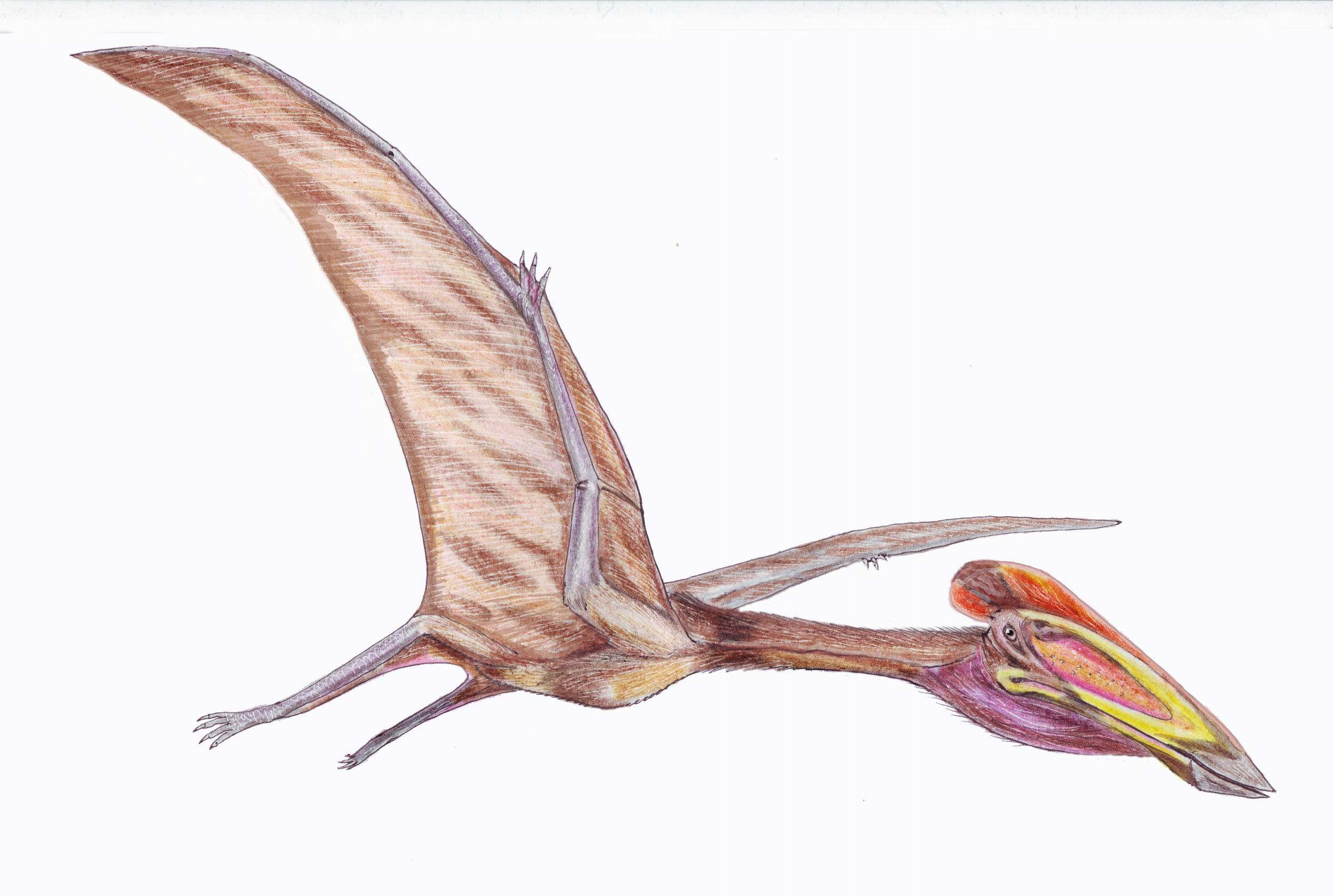
Restoration of Bakonydraco as a tapejarid (top) and azhdarchid (bottom); its placement is controversial

Bakonydraco is based on holotype MTM Gyn/3, a nearly complete mandibula, a fusion of the lower jaws. Also assigned to it, as paratype, is MTM Gyn/4, 21: parts from another jaw's symphysis (the front parts, having fused into a single blade-like structure, of the two lower jaws); azhdarchid wing bones and neck vertebrae from the same area may also belong to it.

The lower jaws are toothless and the two halves of the mandibula are frontally fused for about half of its overall length, forming a long, pointed section that is compressed side-to-side and also expanded vertically, giving it a somewhat spearhead- or arrowhead-like shape from the side. This expansion occurs both on the lower edge and on the top surface, where the most extreme point corresponds with a transverse ridge which separates the straight back half of the symphysis from the pointed end in the front. The jaws of MTM Gyn/3 are 29 centimetres (11 inches) long, and the wingspan of the genus is estimated to be 3.5 to 4 meters (11 to 13 feet), which is medium-sized for a pterosaur. Because the jaws are relatively taller than other azhdarchids, and reminiscent of Tapejara, it could have been a frugivore.

== Classification ==
The taxonomic placement of Bakonydraco within Azhdarchoidea remains controversial. Ősi, Weishampel and Jianu initially assigned it to the family Azhdarchidae in 2005, but paleontologists Brian Andres and Timothy Myers in 2013 had proposed that Bakonydraco actually belonged to the family Tapejaridae, in a position slightly more basal than both Tapejara and Tupandactylus. Indeed, the original paper describing this species compared the holotype jaw to Tapejara and Sinopterus, implicating its affinities to this clade (or at least a large amount of convergence). If Bakonydraco were a tapejarid, it represents one of the few Late Cretaceous records of this family. A more recent phylogenetic study reinforces this placement. The cladogram on the left follows the 2014 phylogenetic analysis by Brian Andres and colleagues that also recovered Bakonydraco within the family Tapejaridae, more specifically within the tribe Tapejarini. In 2020, in a phylogenetic analysis conducted by David Martill and colleagues, Bakonydraco was once again found within the Tapejaridae, this time consisting of two lineages: the Tapejarinae and the Sinopterinae, Bakonydraco was recovered within the subfamily Sinopterinae in the basalmost position, unlike in the analysis by Andres and colleagues. Their cladogram is shown on the right. Other paleontologists including Rubi Vargas Pêgas also favored a tapejarid classification for Bakonydraco.

Topology 1: Andres et al. (2014).

- Tapejaromorpha
  - Bennettazhia oregonensis
  - - - Eopteranodon lii
      - - "Sinopterus" gui
        - Nemicolopterus crypticus
    - - Huaxiapterus jii
      - Tapejaridae
        - Sinopterus dongi
        - Tapejarinae
          - - "Huaxiapterus" benxiensis
            - "Huaxiapterus" corollatus
          - Tapejarini
            - - Tupandactylus navigans
              - Tupandactylus imperator
            - - Bakonydraco galaczi
              - - Europejara olcadesorum
                - Tapejara wellnhoferi

Topology 2: Martill et al. (2020).

- Tapejaromorpha
  - Bennettazhia oregonensis
  - Tapejaridae
    - Tapejarinae
      - - Tapejara wellnhoferi
        - Europejara olcadesorum
        - Vectidraco daisymorrisae
      - - Caiuajara dobruskii
        - Tupandactylus navigans
        - Tupandactylus imperator
    - Sinopterinae
      - Bakonydraco galaczi
      - - - "Huaxiapterus" benxiensis
          - "Huaxiapterus" corollatus
        - - Eopteranodon lii
          - - Huaxiapterus jii
            - Sinopterus dongi

Other authors have supported its position as an azhdarchid or a non-azhdarchid azhdarchoid outside Tapejaridae based on phylogenetic analyses. In 2015, Averianov and colleagues recovered Bakonydraco as either an azhdarchid or a sister taxon of azhdarchids and chaoyangopterids. In 2020, Martill and colleagues recovered Bakonydraco within Azhdarchidae in their description of Afrotapejara. In 2025, Thomas and McDavid also recovered Bakonydraco as an azhdarchid, specifically within the subfamily Quetzalcoatlinae as shown by the simplified version of their phylogeny below.

- Quetzalcoatlinae
  - Cryodrakon boreas
  - - Hatzegopterygia
      - Tsogtopteryx mongoliensis
      - - Albadraco tharmisensis
        - - Bakonydraco spp.
          - LPB R.2395 ('Pui azhdarchid')
          - - Hatzegopteryx thambemba
            - LPB R.2347
            - EME 315 ('Râpa Roşie azhdarchid')
    - Quetzalcoatlini
      - - Nipponopterus mifunensis
        - Gobiazhdarcho tsogtbataari
      - Serpennata
        - MPCA PV 2003 ('Candeleros Azhdarchid')
        - 'Arambourgiania clade'
          - Infernodrakon hastacollis
          - - MPPM 2000.23.1 (Arambourgiania sp.)
            - Arambourgiania philadelphiae
        - 'Quetzalcoatlus clade'
          - - Thanatosdrakon amaru
            - Quetzalcoatlus nothropi
          - - 'Tous pterosaur'
            - ME1 04
            - UCMP 114286
            - FSAC-OB 14 (aff. Quetzalcoatlus)
            - Quetzalcoatlus lawsoni

== Paleobiology ==
Medullary bone tissue was known only from reproductively mature modern birds and some non-avian dinosaurs like Tyrannosaurus rex, until it was reported from the largest known femur of the pterosaur Pterodaustro in 2009, the first reported occurrence of a non-dinosaurian medullary bone. In 2014, a putative medullary bone-like tissue was also reported from the mandibles of another pterosaur Bakonydraco, but the authors noted that this tissue was likely not formed in response to reproduction, since the specimens were skeletally immature. One of the authors, Edina Prondvai, later acknowledged that it is hard to justify comparing the purported tissue from Bakonydraco with avian medullary bone tissue due to its unusual anatomical location, since the medullary bone tissues of modern birds are not found in mandibles, though she noted that the putative medullary bone tissue of a saltasaurine sauropod was also reported in unusual locations. Some researchers stated that the tissue does seemingly represent a vascularised endosteal bone, though the possibility that it represents a pathologically formed tissue cannot be precluded, while others noted the fact that the medullary bone tissues are only known from reproductively mature females which makes the identity of this tissue uncertain.

== See also ==
- List of pterosaur genera
- Timeline of pterosaur research
