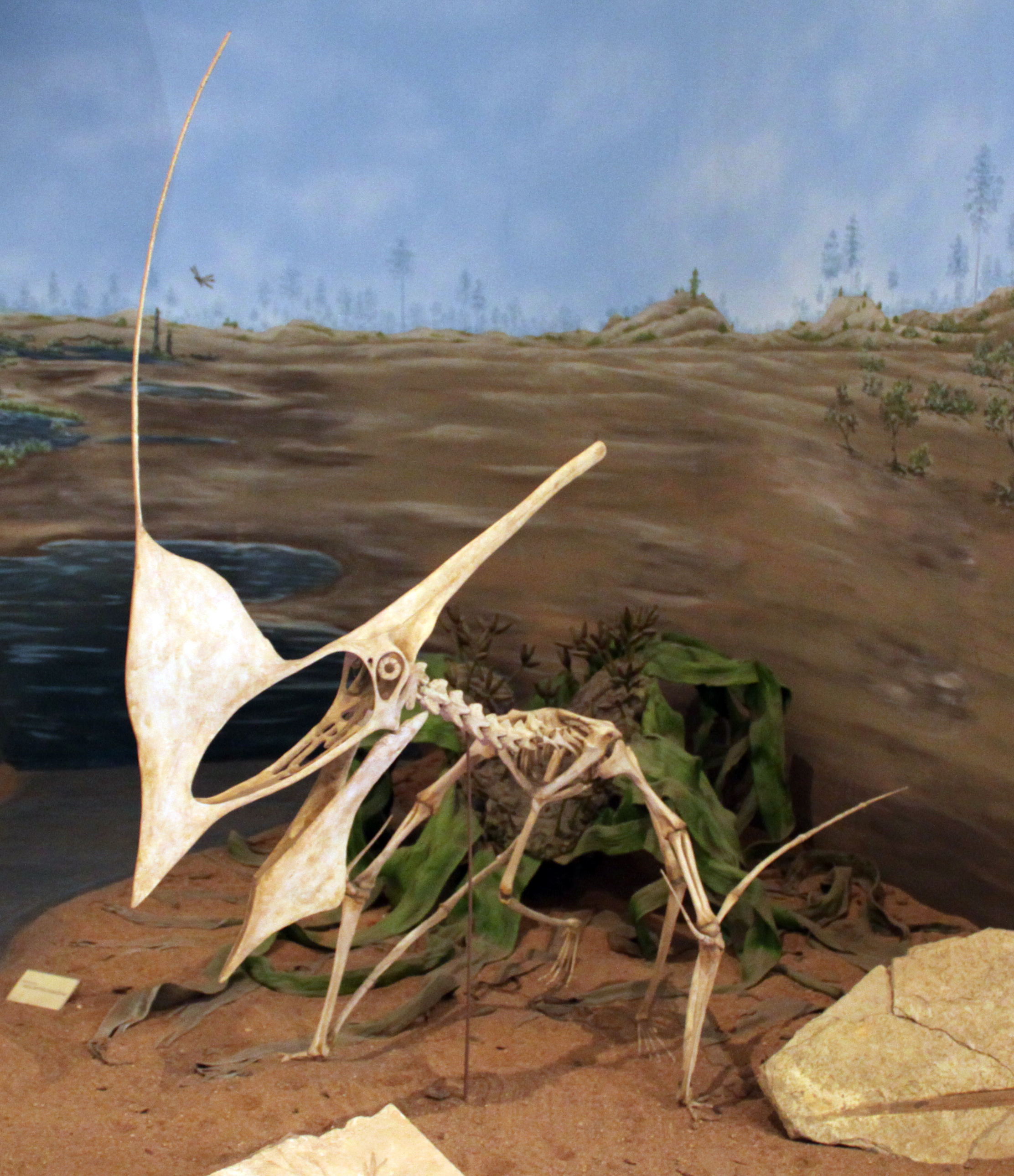
- Reconstructed T. imperator skeleton, National Museum of Brazil

Scientific classification
- Kingdom: Animalia
- Phylum: Chordata
- Class: Reptilia
- Order: †Pterosauria
- Suborder: †Pterodactyloidea
- Clade: †Azhdarchoidea
- Family: †Tapejaridae
- Subfamily: †Tapejarinae
- Tribe: †Tapejarini
- Genus: †Tupandactylus; Kellner & Campos, 2007

Type species
- †Tapejara imperator Campos & Kellner, 1997

Species
- †Tupandactylus imperator (Campos & Kellner, 1997); †Tupandactylus navigans (Frey, Martill & Buchy, 2003)

Synonyms
- List of synonyms: Genus synonymy; Ingridia Unwin & Martill, 2007 Synonyms of T. imperator; Tapejara imperator Campos & Kellner, 1997; Ingridia imperator (Campos & Kellner, 1997) Synonyms of T. navigans; Tapejara navigans Frey, Martill & Buchy, 2003; Ingridia navigans (Frey, Martill & Buchy, 2003)

= Tupandactylus =

Tupandactylus Temporal range: Early Cretaceous, 112 Ma

Genus of tapejarid pterosaur from the Early Cretaceous

Tupandactylus (meaning "Tupâ or Tupan finger", in reference to a personification of the Tupi supreme deity) is a genus of tapejarid pterodactyloid pterosaur from the Early Cretaceous Crato Formation of Brazil. It is known from two species, T. imperator and T. navigans, though it has been suggested that there is only a single, highly sexually dimorphic species (which would then be T. imperator). T. imperator was described in 1997 by D. A. Campos and Alexander W. A. Kellner, who assigned it to Tapejara. Six years later, T. navigans was named and also assigned to Tapejara. In 2007, two efforts to reallocate both species to a new genus were made, and ultimately the name Tupandactylus came into use.

The larger Tupandactylus species, T. imperator, has an estimated wingspan of 3–4 m (9.8–13.1 ft) and may have stood 1.5 m (4.9 ft) tall when measured to the tip of its crest, whereas the smaller T. navigans had a wingspan of about 2.7 m (8.9 ft). Like other tapejarids, Tupandactylus had a large head crest, formed by keratinous fibres and supported by a dorsal extension of the rostrum and a rearward extension of the parietal bone. In T. imperator, the crest was large and rounded, whereas in T. navigans, it was tall and vertical. An additional crest was formed by a projection at the front of the lower jaw. The anatomy of Tupandactylus was standard for a tapejarid, with a large opening formed from the combination of the nasal cavity and the antorbital fenestra, and an eye socket set fairly low in the skull.

== History ==
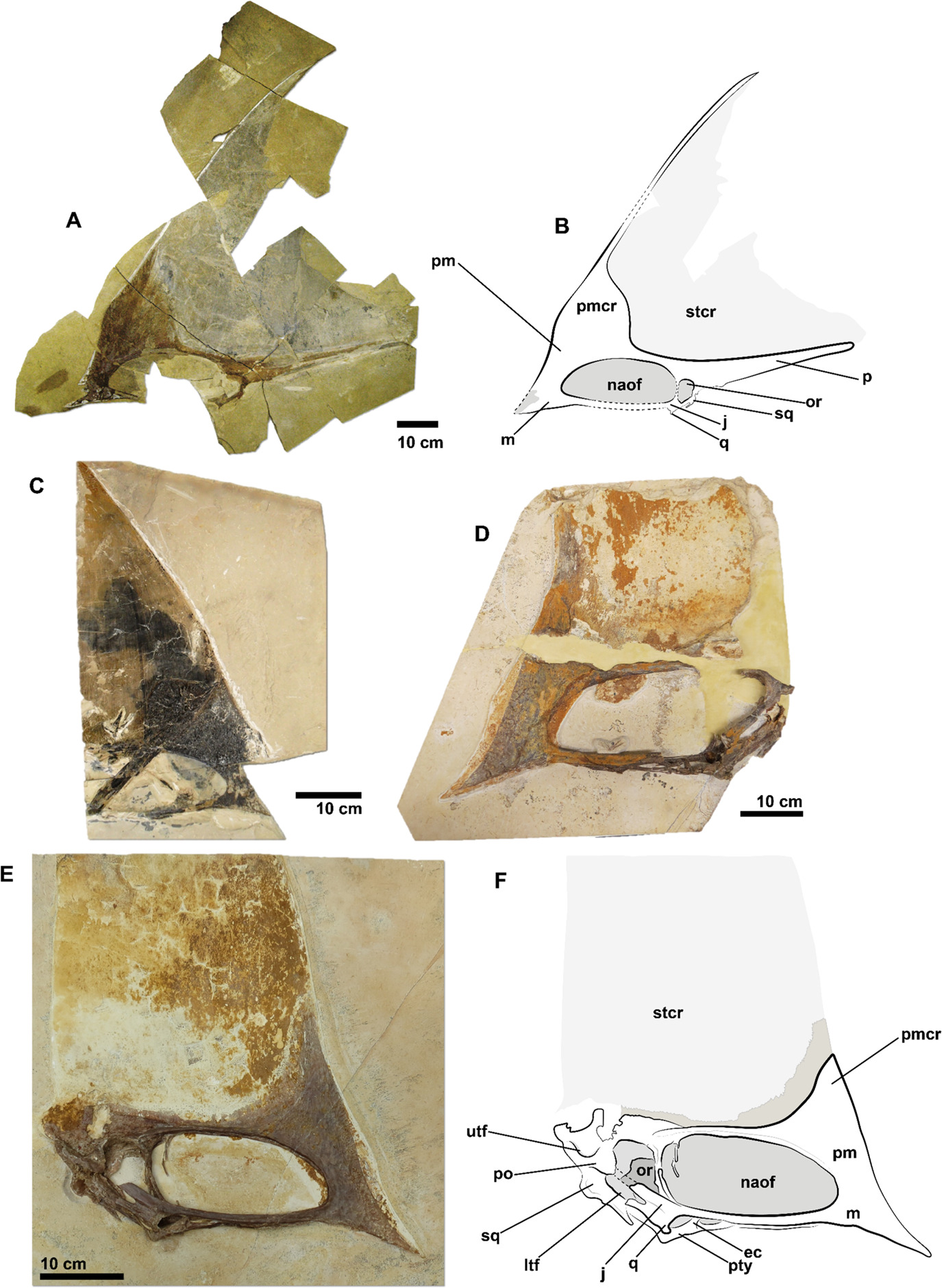
Holotypes and assigned specimens

The holotype specimen of Tupandactylus is MCT 1622-R, a skull and partial lower jaw, found in the Crato Formation, dating to the boundary of the Aptian-Albian stages of the early Cretaceous period, about 112 Ma ago. It was initially described as a species of Tapejara, T. imperator, by D. A. Campos and Alexander W. A. Kellner in 1997. A second taxon, T. navigans, was named in 2003. In 2007, two efforts to reassign them to a new genus were made. One, by David Unwin and David Martill, would have seen them both assigned to the new genus "Ingridia"; the other, by Campos and Kellner, erected the genus Tupandactylus; ultimately, the latter name was used, since the publication by Unwin and Martill was published in a book months after the competing study. The genus name Tupandactylus derives from the name of the Tupí-Guaraní "Tupâ" or "Tupan", referring to a manifestation of the supreme deity Nhanderuvuçu which takes the form of thunder, and the Greek daktylos ("finger"). A second species of Tupandactylus, T. navigans, was named in 2003; like the type species, it, too, was initially assigned to Tapejara.

A 2021 study describing a very complete T. navigans specimen suggested that the two species might represent different sexes of one sexually dimorphic species, but cautioned that further study was needed to test this.

== Description ==
=== Size ===
Tupandactylus imperator has been estimated to have had a wingspan about 3 to 4 m (9.8 to 13.1 ft), while T. navigans is smaller, with a wingspan of 2.7 m (8.9 ft). In 2013, Mark P. Witton suggested T. imperator had a wingspan of about 3 m (9.8 ft), and a standing height of 1.5 m (4.9 ft), when measured to the tip of its head crest. (Note: In the text it is stated to be T. imperator's shoulder height, though this is contradicted by the size comparison provided.)

=== Skull ===
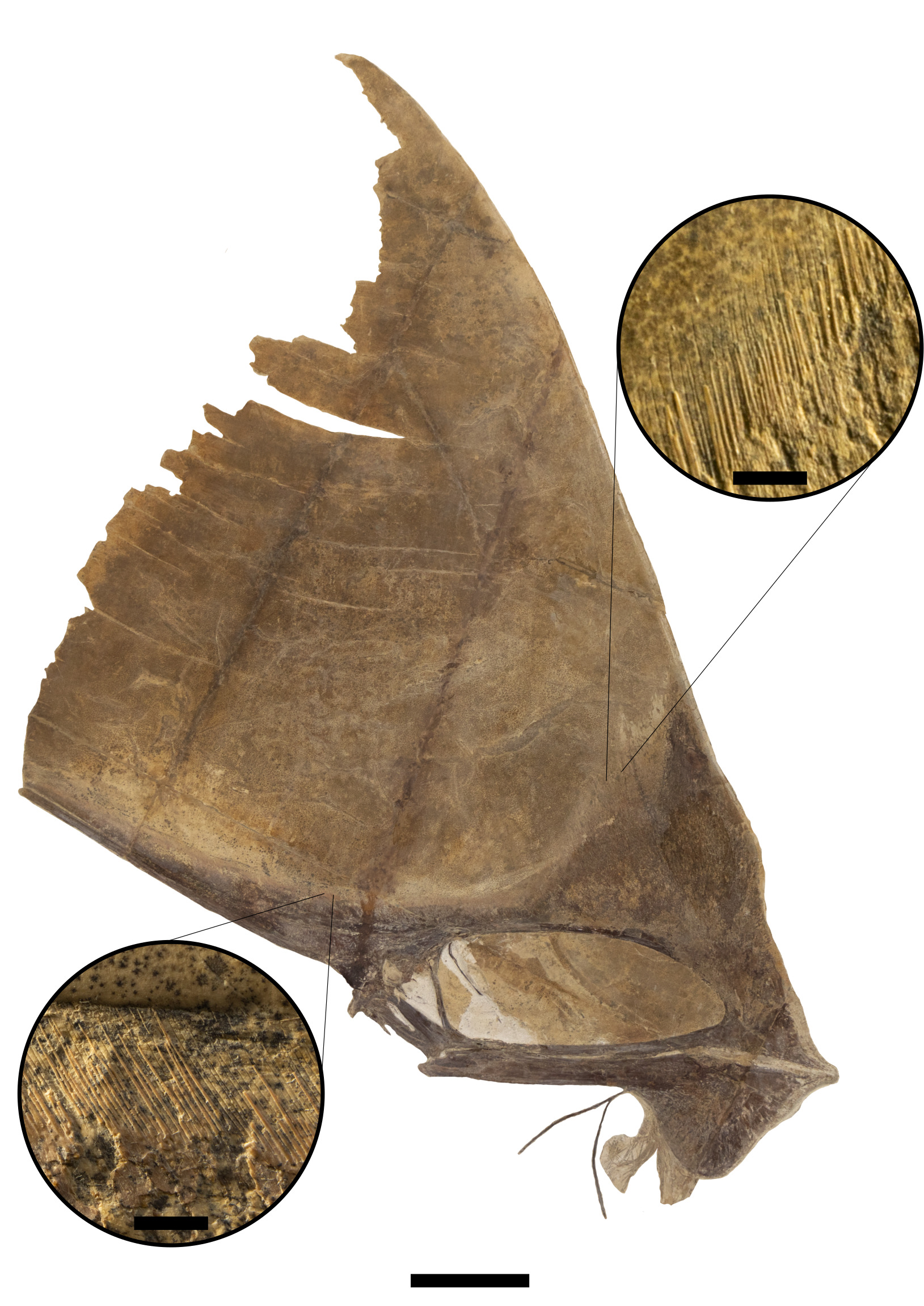
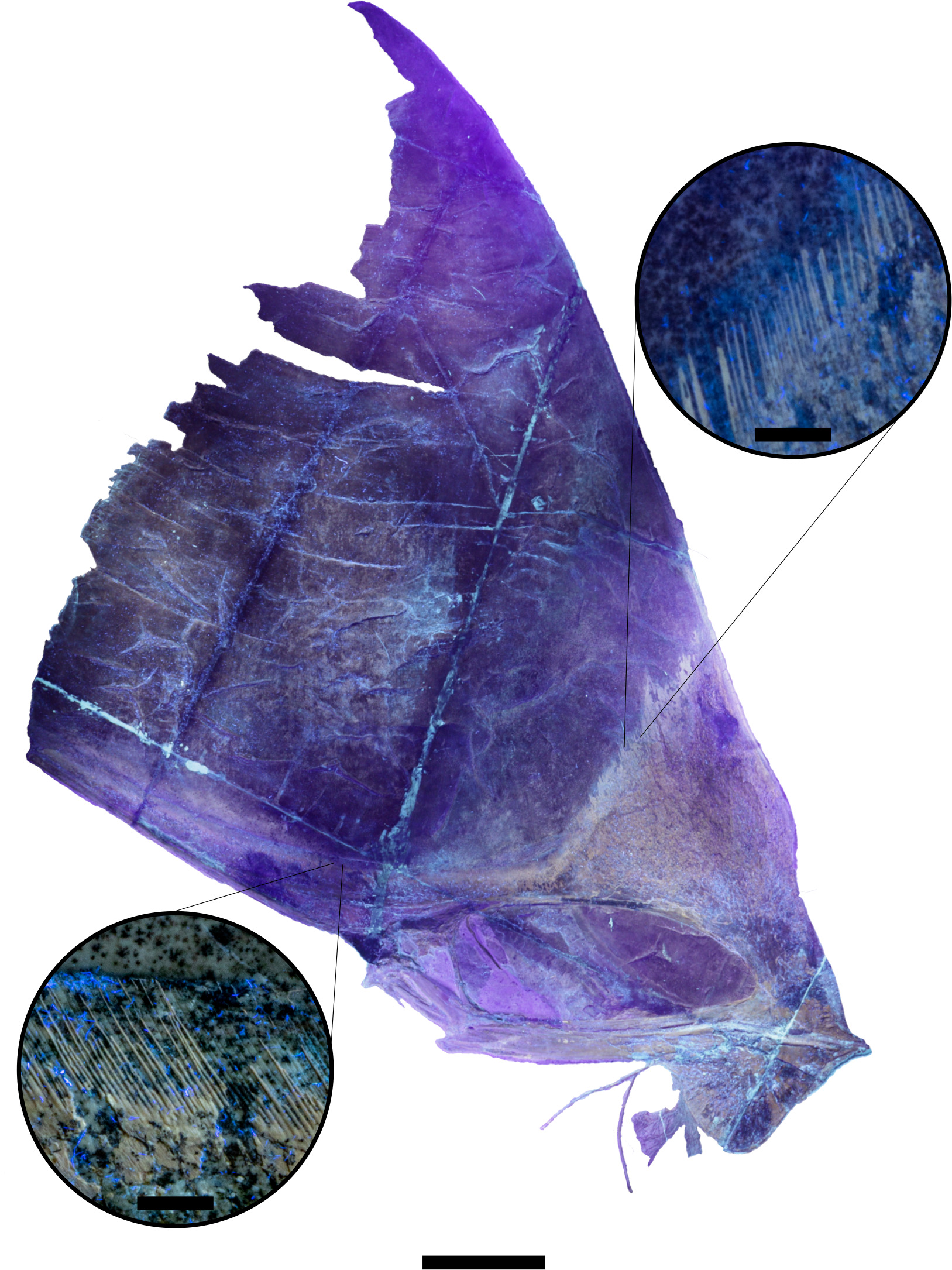
Skull of Tupandactylus imperator specimen MN 7852-V, under ultraviolet light at right

Tapejarids overall were characterised by short faces, the product of an abbreviated rostrum (snout) and a downturned jaw tip. As a pterodactyloid, Tupandactylus bore a so-called nasoantorbital fenestra, a structure created by the fusion of the naris (nasal cavity) and antorbital fenestra. When viewed from a lateral (side) view, the premaxilla formed a triangular plate above the nasoantorbital fenestra. The premaxillas and maxillas of pterodactyloids formed a single unit, the premaxillomaxilla, whose fusion occurred early in ontogeny. The anterior (front) and ventral (lower) margins of the resultant structure, as well as the dentary (the front portion of the lower jaw), were covered in a rhamphotheca, or beak. Rhamphotheca are known from multiple Tupandactylus specimens. The orbit (eye socket) was pear-shaped, and as in other azhdarchoids, was positioned below the dorsal (upper) margin of the nasoantorbital fenestra; however, whereas some taxa such as Caupedactylus had very low orbits, the orbit of Tupandactylus was more akin to that of Caiuajara and Tapejara. The dentary had a mandibular symphysis which was slightly downturned towards the front. Like the skull, the dentary was crested. In T. imperator, the dentary crest is straight, whereas in T. navigans it is recurved.

Tupandactylus is notable for its large cranial crest, composed partly of bone and partly of soft tissue fibres, likely keratin. The crest was supported by a raised process on the premaxillomaxilla, often itself referred to as a crest, and a bony prong extending from the back of the head, formed from the parietal bone. The crest shapes of the two species differed substantially. T. imperator had a large, rounded crest, fairly backswept, with an irregular rear margin, and with a length and height equal to about one-third of its total wingspan; T. navigans, meanwhile, had a more vertical cranial crest, with a straighter posterior (rear) edge, and a blunt posterior skull face, unlike other tapejarids.

Hyoid bones are known from both species of Tupandactylus, ceratobranchials in both instances. Little data exists on the hyoid apparatus in pterosaurs, though from what can be seen, those of Tupandactylus are typical for the clade.

=== Postcranial skeleton ===
==== Vertebral column ====
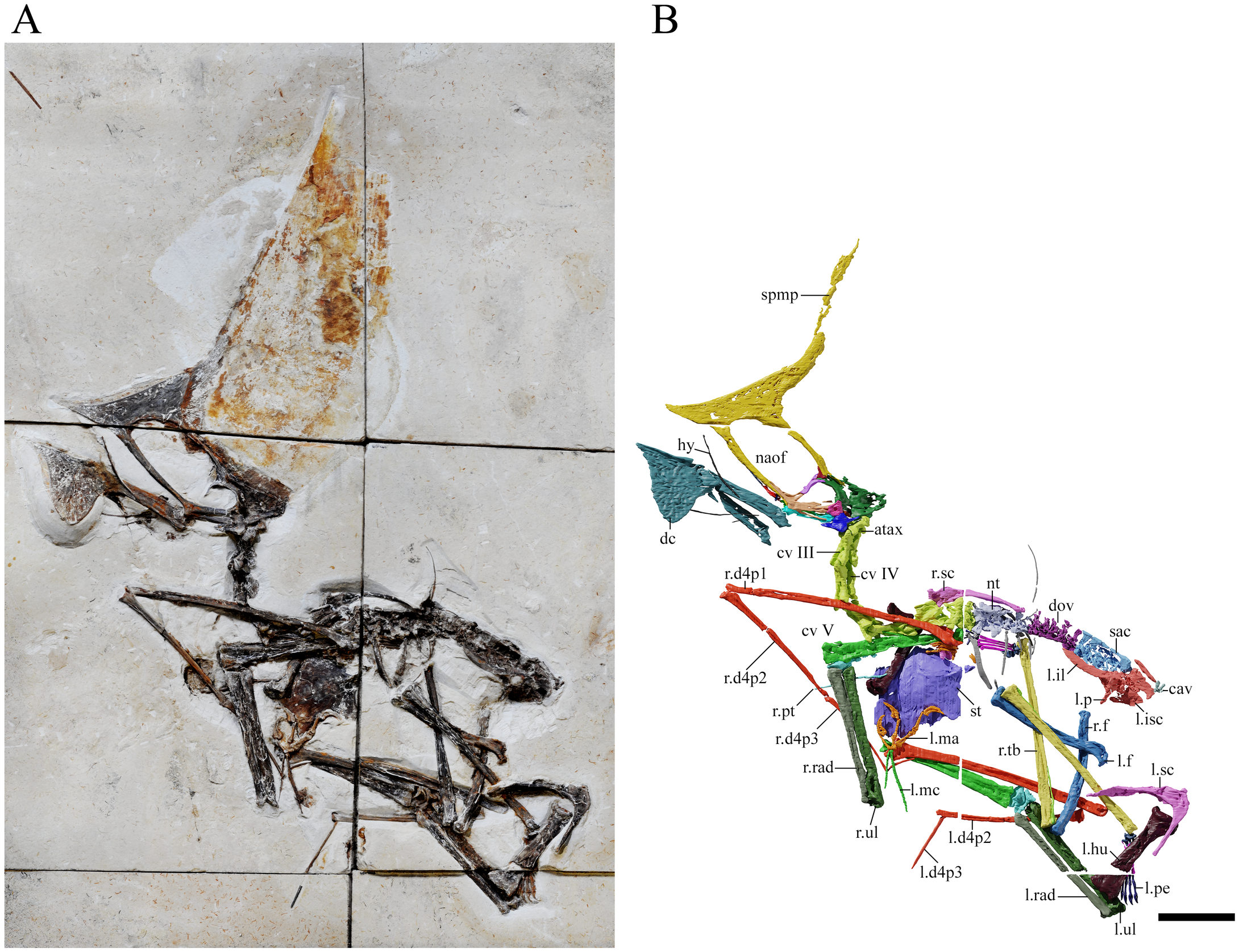
T. navigans skeleton showing soft tissue crest impression and what is known of the postcranial skeleton in Tupandactylus

Eight cervical (neck) vertebrae, including the atlas (first) and axis (second), were present in the skeleton of Tupandactylus navigans. The main bodies of the vertebrae, the centra, were procoelous, meaning that they were concave anteriorly and convex anteriorly. The neural arches of the cervical vertebrae were inflated laterally, as is typical for pterodactyloids. Tupandactylus' dorsal vertebrae could be divided into three regions. The first five dorsal (back) vertebrae are fused into a notarium, like in some other pterosaurs and birds, and particularly ornithocheiroids. The notarium supported the shoulder girdle during flight, and prevented the ribcage from being compressed by the wing muscles during each stroke. Posterior to the notarium was a set of five freely-moving mid-dorsal vertebrae, and posterior to that was a set of five synsacral vertebrae, dorsal vertebrae which had been incorporated into the sacrum for support. Five caudal (tail) vertebrae are preserved, described as "spindle-like". It is unlikely this is the full extent of the tail, though given the paucity of caudal remains from azhdarchoids it is difficult to say.

==== Appendicular skeleton ====
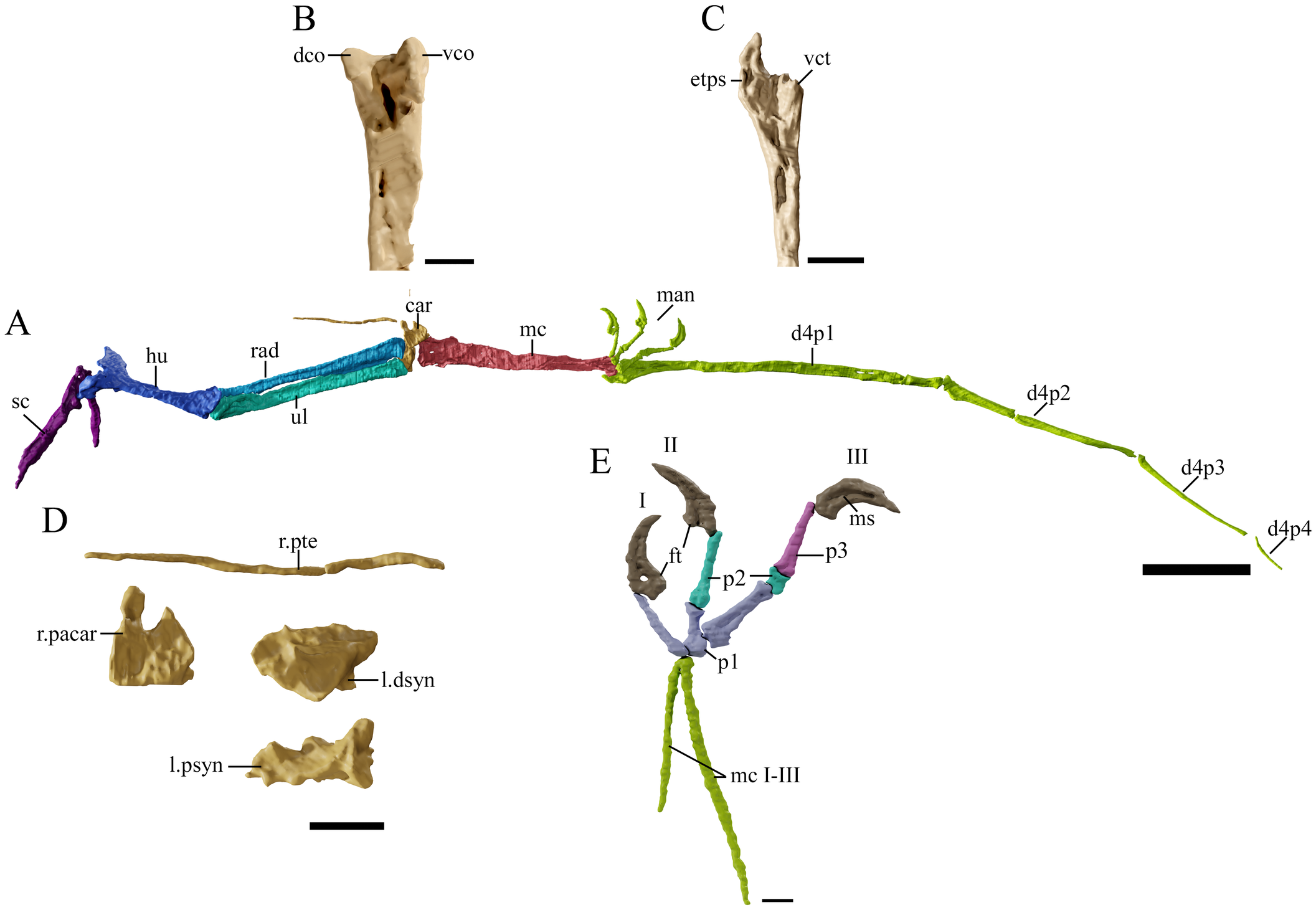
Forelimb elements of T. navigans

The sternum of Tupandactylus was wide and roughly square. Like that of Tapejara, it was perforated dorsally by a pneumatic foramen (a hole connected to air spaces within the bone). The scapulocoracoids (structures formed from the fusion of the scapula and coracoid bones) were like those of other azhdarchoids, wherein the scapula was far longer. The deltopectoral crests were strongly developed, forming a significant portion of the shaft of the humerus (the bone of the upper arm). The humeral shaft is straight, and is less anteroposteriorly compressed than in Tapejara. The radius and ulna, the two bones of the forearm, were straight and lightly built. The carpal (wrist) complex was composed of two syncarpal bones, the paraxial carpal, and the pteroid bone, a structure found exclusively among pterosaurs. The pteroid was oriented inwards, pointing towards the deltopectoral crest, and supported the propatagium. Specialized muscles allowed it to move slightly. In Tupandactylus, the ulna was over half the length of the ulna. The first three metacarpals (manus or hand bones) were slender and rod-like. The fourth metacarpal comprised roughly 37% of the length of the wing, minus the wing finger. Tupandactylus had two phalanges (finger bones) on the first of the ground-contacting finger, three on the second, and four on the third. In the T. navigans specimen, the ungual phalanges, the bones to which the claws were attached, preserve keratinous outlines. The first phalanx of each wing finger was roughly two-and-a-half times the length of the humerus, typically for tapejarids; the following phalanx was shorter, the third was even shorter, and the fourth is short and "mainly featureless".

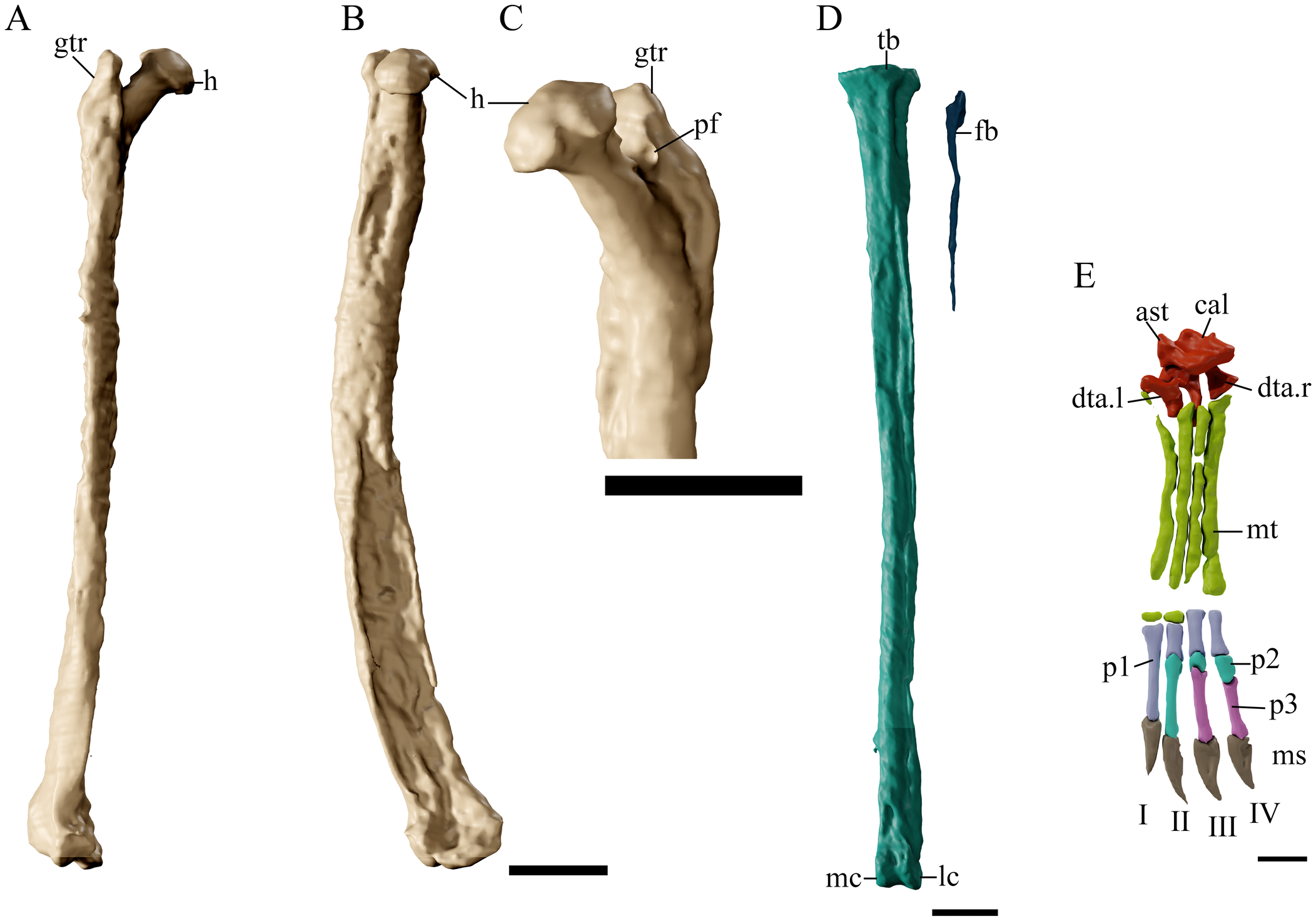
Hindlimb elements of T. navigans

The pelvis of Tupandactylus is mostly known, lacking only a few elements such as the prepubis. The pubis is short and blunt; together with the ischium, it forms the ischiopubic plate. Like most azhdarchoids (barring, for example, Caiuajara and Zhejiangopterus), the femora (the bones of the upper leg) were slightly longer than the humeri. The femora are typical for azhdarchoids, having a femoral shaft which appears bowed when viewed laterally, yet straight anteriorly or posteriorly. The tibia and fibula, the two bones of the lower leg, were lightly built, roughly half as long again as each femur. Tupandactylus' proximal (upper) tarsals (pedal, or foot bones) were the calcaneum and the astragalus, which were similar to those of Sinopterus and Tapejara. As in all late-diverging pterodactyloids, only four pedal digits were present. The pedal phalanges were thin and elongated. As in other pterodactyloids, the manual (forefoot) unguals were considerably larger than those of the pes.

=== Pycnofibres ===
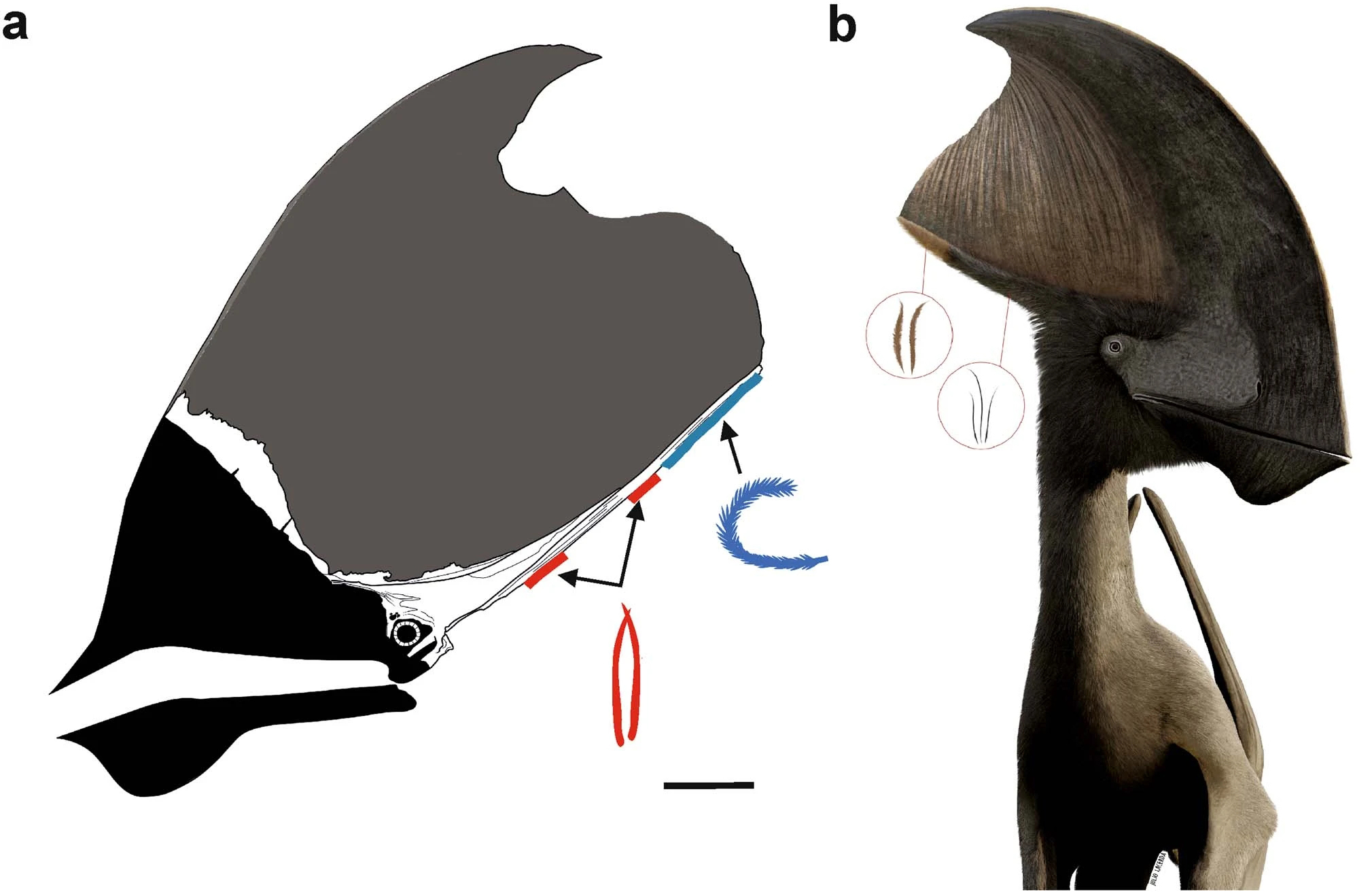
Life restoration showing distribution of filaments preserved in a T. imperator specimen

Some specimens of Tupandactylus imperator preserve pycnofibres, filamentous structures similar to mammalian hair found in all pterosaurs. A well preserved fossil of T. imperator was found to have pigment cells with similar forms to those seen in modern birds, more complex in organization than those previously known from other pterosaurs. This specimen also suggest the presence of Stage IIIa feathers, further indication of more complex filament structures in pterosaurs. Supporting a model of common ancestry with the filaments of birds, the authors termed these structures as pterosaur feathers rather than pycnofibres. This common origin had been suggested before, but remains controversial.

== Classification ==
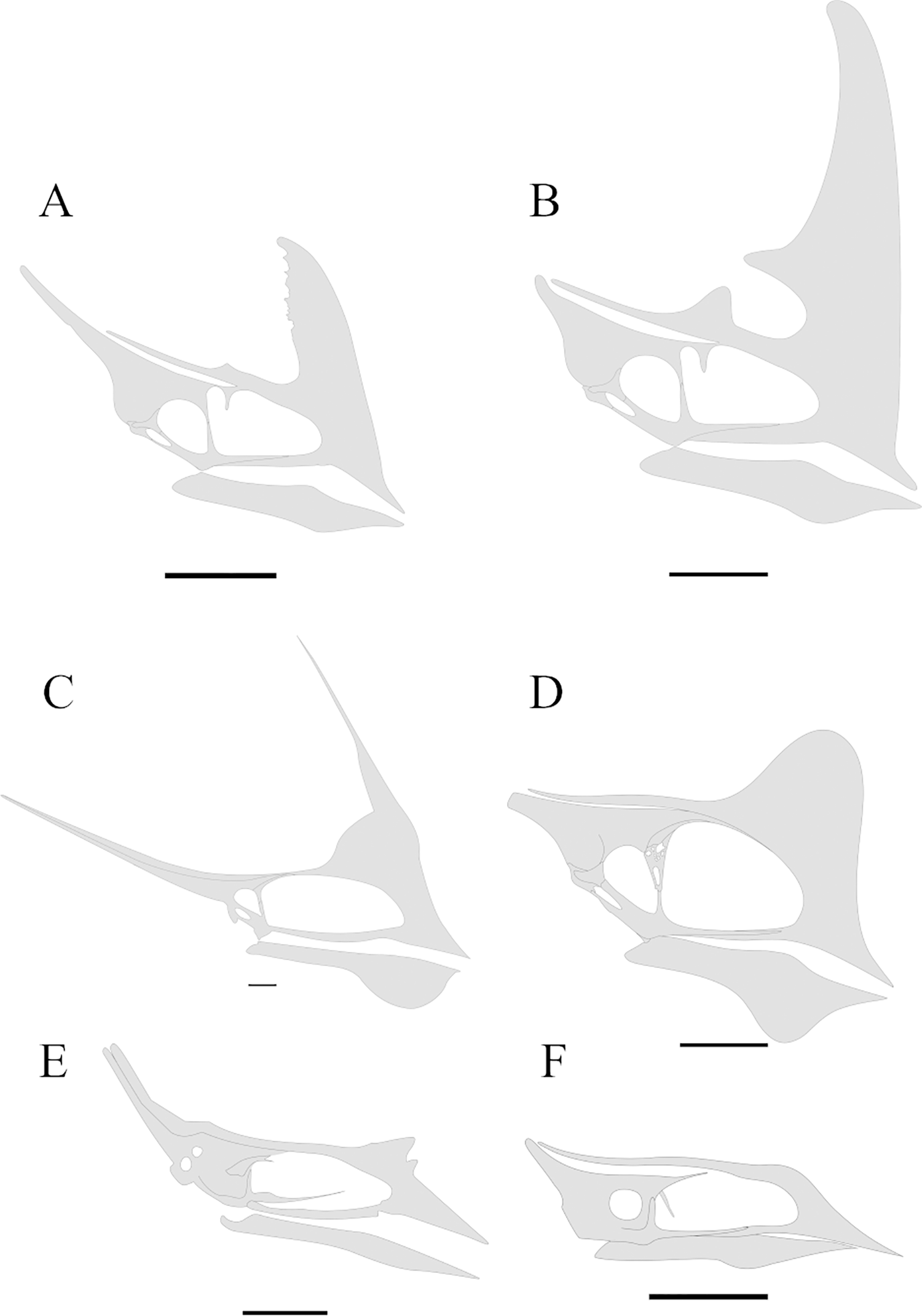
Comparison between the skulls of six tapejarid genera. A) Torukjara, B) Caiuajara, C) Tupandactylus, D) Tapejara, E) "Huaxiapterus", F) Sinopterus

Beginning in 2006, several researchers, including Kellner and Campos (who named Tupandactylus), had found that the three species traditionally assigned to the genus Tapejara (T. wellnhofferi, T. imperator, and T. navigans) are in fact distinct both in anatomy and in their relationships to other tapejarid pterosaurs, and thus needed to be given new generic names. However, just how the species should be split proved controversial. Kellner and Campos considered only T. imperator to warrant a new name, creating Tupandactylus. However, another study published in 2007 by Unwin and Martill found that T. navigans, previously assigned to Tapejara, was actually most closely related to T. imperator and belonged with it in a new genus separate from Tapejara. In 2007, at a symposium held in honor of renowned pterosaur researcher Peter Wellnhofer, Unwin and Martill announced the new genus name Ingridia, in honor of Wellnhofer's late wife Ingrid. However, when they published this name in a 2007 volume, they assigned imperator as the type species of their new genus, rather than navigans, which they also included as a species of Ingridia. Furthermore, Unwin and Martill's paper was not published until several months after the similar paper by Kellner and Campos. Therefore, because both sets of authors used imperator as the type, Ingridia is considered a junior objective synonym of Tupandactylus. It was not until 2011 that T. navigans was formally reclassified in the genus Tupandactylus, in a subsequent study supporting the conclusions of Unwin and Martill in 2007.

The cladogram below follows the 2014 phylogenetic analysis by Brian Andres and colleagues. They found both T. navigans and T. imperator within the tribe Tapejarini, which in turn was within the larger group Tapejaridae.

- Azhdarchoidea
  - Neoazhdarchia
  - Tapejaromorpha
    - Bennettazhia oregonensis
    - - - Eopteranodon lii
        - - "Sinopterus" gui
          - Nemicolopterus crypticus
      - - Huaxiapterus jii
        - Tapejaridae
          - Sinopterus dongi
          - Tapejarinae
            - - "Huaxiapterus" benxiensis
              - "Huaxiapterus" corollatus
            - Tapejarini
              - - Tupandactylus navigans
                - Tupandactylus imperator
              - - Bakonydraco galaczi
                - - Europejara olcadesorum
                  - Tapejara wellnhoferi

== Palaeobiology ==
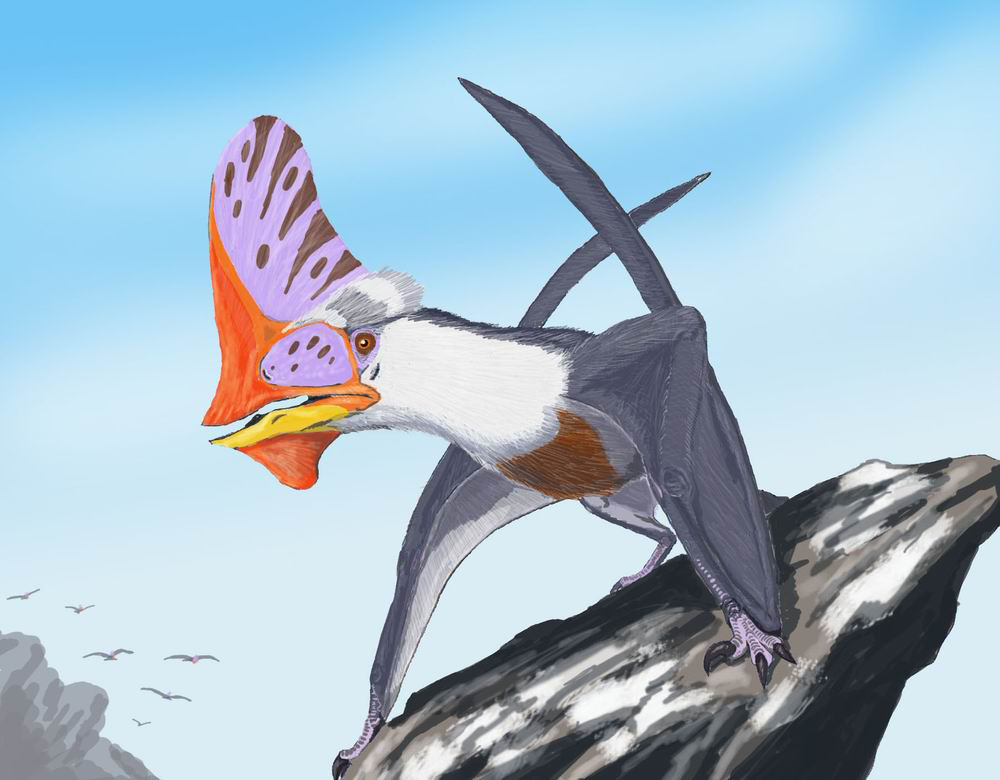
Life restoration of T. navigans in terrestrial pose

=== Terrestrial habits ===
Like other azhdarchoids, including other tapejarids, Tupandactylus may have largely been a terrestrial forager. Examination of the specimen GP/2E 9266 suggests that the pterosaur was capable of flight, but seemingly spent much of its time on the ground thanks to its large crest, longer forelimbs, and a relatively long neck, only taking short flights to possibly escape from predators. Simultaneously, it was not adapted to the same terrestrial stalking lifestyle as azhdarchids are believed to have utilized. Rather, the skull anatomy of T. navigans closely resembles that of Tapejara itself, a taxon suggested to have subsisted upon plant material. The mandible portion of the well-preserved T. imperator skull is directly associated with plant material, either representing a taphonomic phenomenon or possibly a tentative evidence of herbivory.

=== Flight capability ===
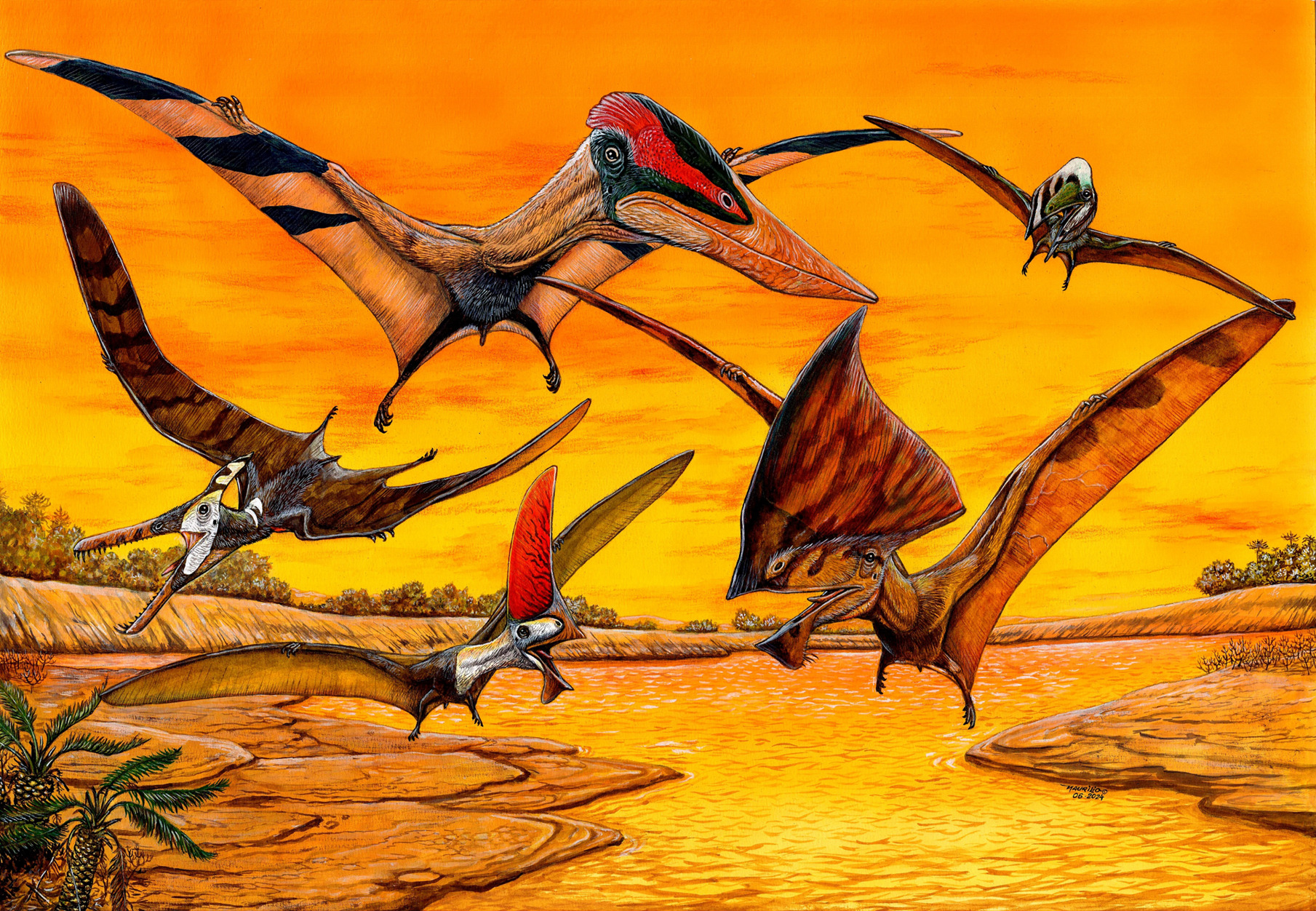
Life restorations of T. navigans and T. imperator (below) and other pterosaurs known from the Crato Formation

The impact of a large head crest on Tupandactylus' flight has seen some discussion in the literature. In their 2003 paper describing T. navigans, Eberhard Frey, David Martill, and Marie-Céline Buchy argued that it would have significantly impacted its aerodynamics, and that adaptations to counteract it (i.e. a reduced neck with tendon locks on each cervical vertebra) were conspicuously absent. Accordingly, Tupandactylus may have been restricted to flying only short distances.

== See also ==
- List of pterosaur genera
- Timeline of pterosaur research
