= Alexander Kellner =

Brazilian geologist and paleontologist (born 1961)

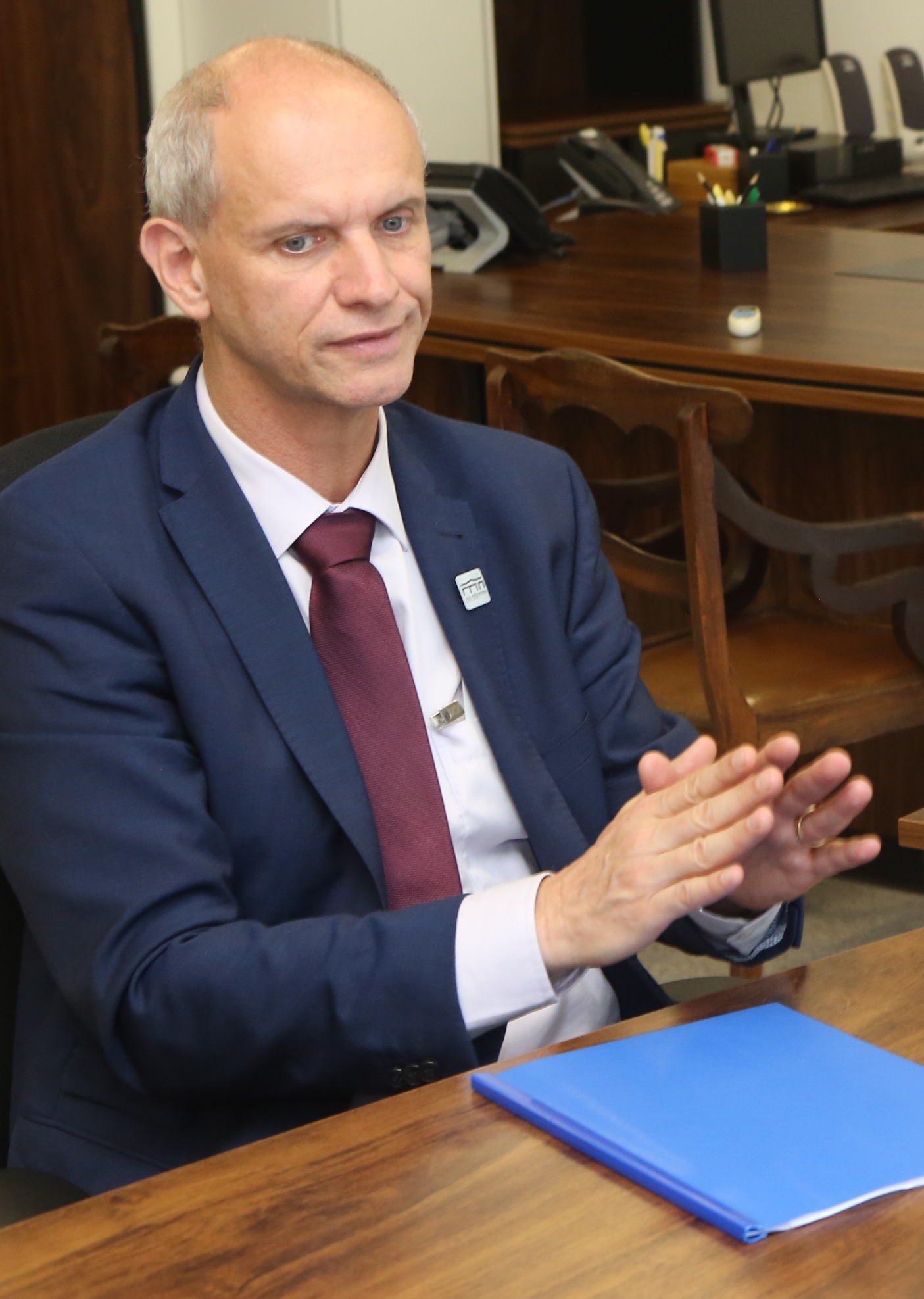
- Kellner in 2018
- Born: Alexander Wilhelm Armin Kellner; September 26, 1961 (age 64); Vaduz, Liechtenstein
- Education: Federal University of Rio de Janeiro; Columbia University
- Known for: Pterosaurs, dinosaurs
- Scientific career
- Fields: Paleontology, Geology
- Workplaces: Ex Director of National Museum (Rio de Janeiro)

Alexander Wilhelm Armin Kellner (born September 26, 1961) is a Brazilian geologist and paleontologist who is a leading expert in the field of studying pterosaurs. His research has focused mainly on fossil reptiles from the Cretaceous Period, including extinct dinosaurs and crocodylomorphs.

Kellner has over 500 publications to his name, has published more than 160 primary studies and two science books. He has participated in paleontological expeditions to many locations including Brazil, Chile, Iran, the United States, Argentina, China, and Antarctica.

His scientific achievements include the description of more than thirty species. For his work he has received several honors and prizes, including the TWAS Prize for Earth Sciences from The World Academy of Sciences and admission to the National Order of Scientific Merit (class Comendador), one Brazil's most prestigious awards.

== Biography ==
Kellner was born in Vaduz, Liechtenstein, son of a German father and Austrian mother. In his early childhood he moved with his parents to Brazil, where he became naturalised Brazilian.

In Rio de Janeiro he received a primary and secondary education at the bilingual Escola Alemã Corcovado. He began studying geology at the Federal University of Rio de Janeiro (UFRJ) in 1981. As a student, he soon began researching fossil vertebrates, particularly reptiles from Brazil's Cretaceous Period. His studies largely concerned pterosaur specimens from the geologic Santana Group, about which he published many papers in the late 1980s. He earned a Master of Science degree in geology at the UFRJ in 1991, a MPhil degree in 1994, and a Ph.D. in 1996 from Columbia University in New York, in a joint program with the American Museum of Natural History. In 1997 he became a professor at the Federal University-owned National Museum of Rio de Janeiro and curator of its geological and paleontological departments. From 1998 to 2001, he served as the chairman of these departments and has been head of the zoology graduate program since 2008. Kellner is also chief editor of the Anais da Academia Brasileira de Ciências, the official publication of the Brazilian Academy of Sciences.

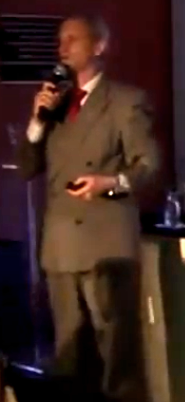
Kellner speaking at the Brazilian Academy of Sciences, Rio de Janeiro, in August 2014

As part of his work on flying reptiles, Kellner organised the Pterosaur Workshop at Pittsburgh, USA, in 1995, and the first pterosaur symposium ever held at the American Museum of Natural History in 1996. As well, he was involved in the organisation of several scientific meetings in Rio de Janeiro such as the 31st International Geological Congress in 2000 and the 2nd Latin-American Congress of Vertebrate Paleontology in 2002.

Kellner has organized or taken part in several paleontological expeditions to many locations around the globe, including Brazil—Mato Grosso, Rio Grande do Sul and Ceará; the deserts of Atacama, Chile and Kerman, Iran; Montana in the United States; Patagonia in Argentina; the famous deposits of Liaoning, China, and James Ross Island in Antarctica.

Kellner has over 500 publications to his name (including abstracts and science articles). He has published more than 160 primary studies and two science books: Pterossauros - os senhores do céu do Brasil ("Pterosaurs — Lords of the Brazilian Sky") and the novel Na terra dos titãs ("In the Land of the Titans"). He has also taken part in documentaries about fossils (e.g., Antarctica - a Summer of 70 million Years and Dinosaur Hunters).

As a result of his scientific activity he has received several honours, being appointed a member of the Brazilian Academy of Sciences in 1997. He is also an honourable member of the New York Paleontologial Society and the Paleontological Society of Chile. He is a research associate of the American Museum of Natural History and of the Chinese Institute of Vertebrate Paleontology and Paleoanthropology.

Besides his teaching activity, having advised over fifteen master and Ph.D. students, Kellner has been active in the propagation of scientific knowledge to the general public. He organised the 1999 exposition No Tempo dos Dinossauros ("In the Time of the Dinosaurs") at the Museum of Earth Sciences, which has been regarded as a landmark for the establishment of paleontology in Brazil, attracting the attention of the people of Brazilian to the studies of fossils. In 2006 he organized the mounting of the first large-scale dinosaur skeleton in Brazil, that of the sauropod Maxakalisaurus topai, for which he received recognition from the Brazilian Congress. Since 2004 he has written a monthly column in Caçadores de Fósseis (Fossil Hunters), on the website Ciência Hoje On Line, a project of the Brazilian Society for Scientific Progress.

Apart from studying their fossils, Kellner has performed important theoretical work on pterosaurs, including cladistic studies regarding their phylogeny. In this he is the founder of a distinctive Brazilian school of the study of pterosaurs, with its own favoured phylogenetic model, clade terminology and nomenclature. Rival models and nomenclatural choices have been devised by the influential British pterosaur researcher David Unwin.

Kellner has received numerous honours and prizes, including the TWAS Prize for Earth Sciences from The World Academy of Sciences. He was admitted in the National Order of Scientific Merit (class Comendador), one the Brazilian Federal Government's most prestigious awards.

== List of species named by Kellner ==
Kellner's scientific achievements include the description of more than thirty species, of which Santanaraptor placidus (1996, 1999) is among the best examples of soft tissue preservation, including blood vessels and muscle fibers, reported in any dinosaur. The pterosaur Thalassodromeus sethi, which Kellner described in 2002 with his colleague Diogenes de Almeida Campos, allowed for the establishment of a new hypothesis regarding the use of the head crest in body temperature regulation of pterosaurs.

A complete list of new species described and named by Kellner, sometimes in cooperation with other researchers, includes:

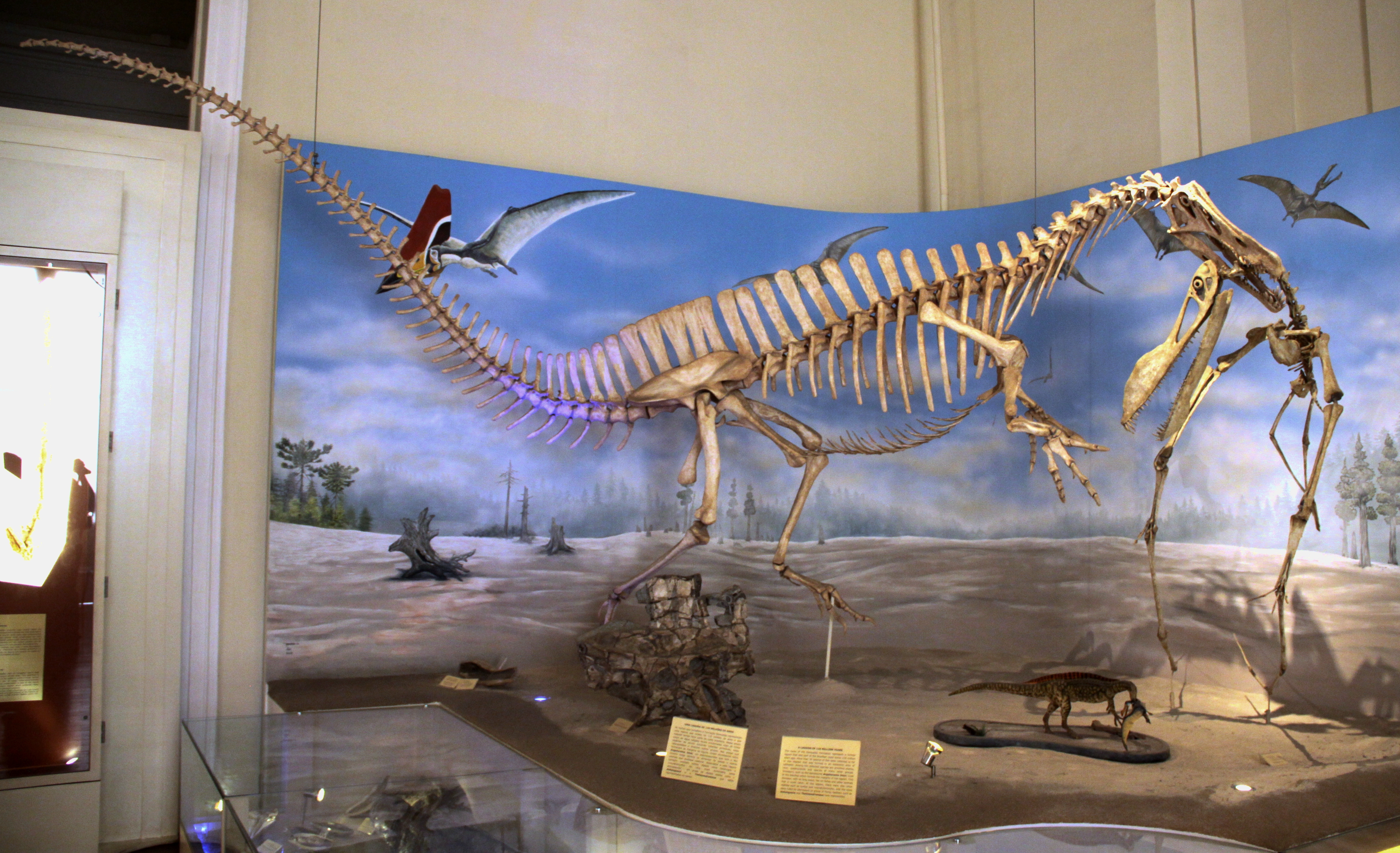
Reconstructed skeleton of the spinosaurid dinosaur Angaturama, National Museum of Rio de Janeiro

- Brasileodactylus araripensis Kellner, 1984 (Reptilia, Pterosauria)
- Anhanguera blittersdorffi Campos & Kellner, 1985 (Reptilia, Pterosauria)
- Oshunia brevis Wenz & Kellner, 1986 (Pisces, Halecomorphi).
- Caririsuchus camposi Kellner, 1987 (Reptilia, Crocodylia)
- Tupuxuara longicristatus Kellner & Campos, 1988 (Reptilia, Pterosauria)
- Tapejara wellnhoferi Kellner, 1989 (Reptilia, Pterosauria)
- Tupuxuara leonardii Kellner & Campos, 1994 (Reptilia, Pterosauria)
- Angaturama limai Kellner & Campos, 1996 (Reptilia, Dinosauria)
- Ongghonia dashzevegi Kellner & McKenna, 1996 (Mammalia, Leptictidae)
- Tupandactylus imperator (Campos & Kellner, 1997) (Reptilia, Pterosauria)
- Siroccopteryx moroccensis Mader & Kellner, 1999 (Reptilia, Pterosauria)
- Gondwanatitan faustoi Kellner & Azevedo, 1999 (Reptilia, Dinosauria)
- Santanaraptor placidus Kellner, 1999 (Reptilia, Dinosauria)
- Anhanguera piscator Kellner & Tomida, 2000 (Reptilia, Pterosauria)
- Stratiotosuchus maxhechti Campos, Suarez, Riff & Kellner, 2001 (Reptilia, Crocodylia)
- Thalassodromeus sethi Kellner & Campos, 2002 (Reptilia, Pterosauria)

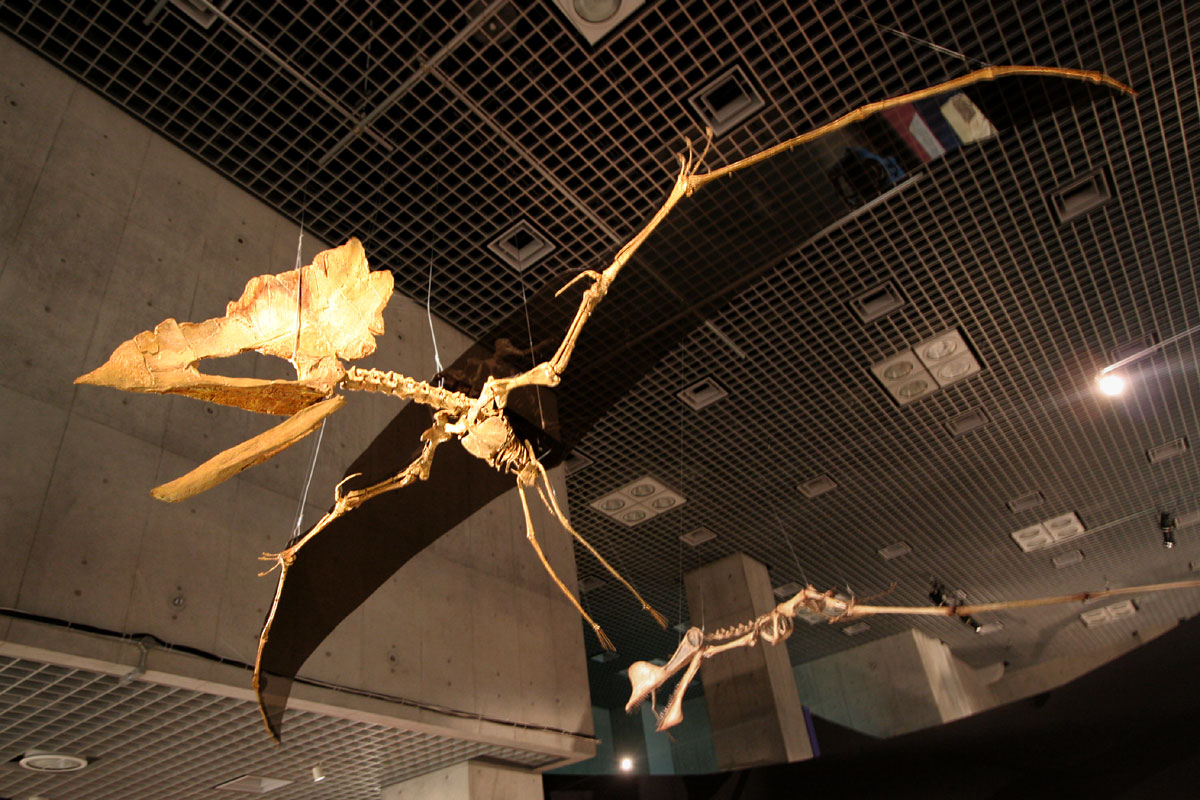
Reconstructed skeleton of the pterosaur Thalassodromeus at the National Museum of Nature and Science, Tokyo

- Pycnonemosaurus nevesi Kellner & Campos, 2002 (Reptilia, Dinosauria)
- Kaikaifilusaurus calvoi Simón & Kellner, 2003. (Reptilia, Sphenodontia)
- Unaysaurus tolentinoi Leal, L.A., Azevedo, S.A., Kellner, A.W.A. & Rosa, Á.A.S., 2004 (Reptilia, Dinosauria)
- Unenlagia paynemili Calvo, J.O., Porfiri, J. & Kellner, A.W.A., 2004 (Reptilia, Dinosauria)
- Feilongus youngi Wang, Kellner, Zhou & Campos, 2005 (Reptilia, Pterosauria)
- Nurhachius ignaciobritoi Wang, Kellner, Zhou & Campos, 2005 (Reptilia, Pterosauria)
- Baurutitan britoi Kellner, A.W.A., Campos, D. A., Trotta, M. N. F. 2005 (Reptilia, Dinosauria)
- Trigonosaurus pricei Campos, D.A., Kellner, A.W.A., Bertini, R.J., Santucci, R.M. 2005 (Reptilia, Dinosauria)
- Caririemys violetae Oliveira, G.R. & Kellner, A.W.A. 2007 (Reptilia, Testudines)
- Gegepterus changi Wang, Kellner, Zhou & Campos, 2007 (Reptilia, Pterosauria)
- Futalognkosaurus dukei Calvo, J.O., Porfiri, J., González-Riga, B.J. & Kellner, A.W.A., 2007 (Reptilia, Dinosauria)
- Nemicolopterus crypticus Wang, Kellner, Zhou & Campos, 2008 (Reptilia, Pterosauria)
- Guarinisuchus munizi Barbosa, Kellner & Viana, 2008 (Reptilia, Crocodylia)
- Hongshanopterus lacustris Wang, Zhou, Campos & Kellner, 2008 (Reptilia, Pterosauria)
- Coringasuchus anisodontis Kellner, A.W.A., Pinheiro, A.E.P., Azevedo, S.A.K., Henriques, D.D.R., Carvalho, L.B. & Oliveira, G. 2009 (Reptilia, Crocodylia)
- Wukongopterus lii Wang, Kellner, Jiang, Meng 2009 (Reptilia, Pterosauria)
- Dawndraco kanzai, Kellner 2010 (Reptilia, Pterosauria)
- Geosternbergia maysei, Kellner 2010 (Reptilia, Pterosauria)
- Aussiedraco molnari, Kellner, A.W.A., Rodrigues, T., Costa, F.R., 2011 (Reptilia, Pterosauria)
- Oxalaia quilombensis, Kellner, A.W.A., Machado E.B., Azevedo, S.A.K., Henriques D.R., Carvalho, L.B., 2011 (Reptilia, Dinosauria)
- Europejara olcadesorum, Vullo, Marugán-Lobón, Kellner, et al. 2012 (Reptilia, Pterosauria)
- Guidraco venator, Wang, Kellner, et al. 2012 (Reptilia, Pterosauria)
- Caupedactylus ybaka, Kellner 2013 (Reptilia, Pterosauria)
- Caiuajara dobruskii, Manzig, Kellner, et al. 2014 (Reptilia, Pterosauria)
- Hamipterus tianshanensis, Wang, Kellner, et al. 2014 (Reptilia, Pterosauria)
- Ikrandraco avatar, Wang, Rodrigues, Jiang, Cheng, Kellner 2014 (Reptilia, Pterosauria)
- Austriadraco dallavecchiai, Kellner 2015 (Reptilia, Pterosauria)
- Bergamodactylus wildi, Kellner 2015 (Reptilia, Pterosauria)
- Linlongopterus jennyae, Rodrigues, T., Jiang, S., Cheng, X., Wang, X., & Kellner, A.W.A., 2015 (Reptilia, Pterosauria)
- Aymberedactylus cearensis, Pêgas, R.V., Leal, M.E.C., & Kellner, A.W.A., 2016 (Reptilia, Pterosauria)
- Argentinadraco barrealensis, Kellner & Calvo, 2017 (Reptilia, Pterosauria)
- Iberodactylus andreui, Holgado, B., Pêgas, R.V., Canudo, J.I., Fortuny, J., Rodrigues, T., Company, J., & Kellner, A.W.A., 2019 (Reptilia, Pterosauria)
- Keresdrakon vilsoni, Kellner, A.W.A., Weinschütz, L.C., Holgado, B., Bantim, R.A. & Sayão, J.M., 2019 (Reptilia, Pterosauria)
- Mimodactylus libanensis, Kellner, A.W.A., Caldwell, M.W., Holgado, B., Dalla Vecchia, F.M., Nohra, R., Sayão, J.M. & Currie, P.J., 2019 (Reptilia, Pterosauria)
