= Tapejara, Paraná =

Coordinates: 23°43′58″S 52°52′22″W

- Municipality
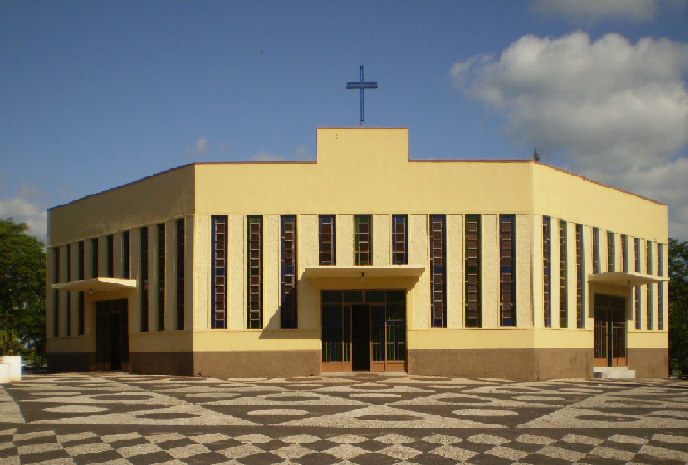

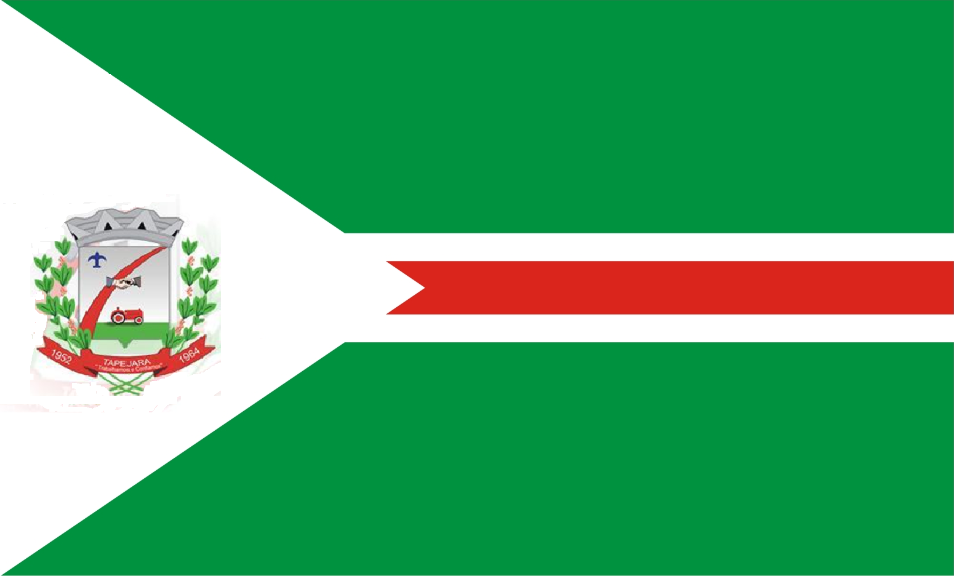
- Flag
- Interactive map of Tapejara, Paraná
- Country: Brazil
- Region: Southern
- State: Paraná
- Mesoregion: Noroeste Paranaense

Population (2020)
  - Total: 16,345
- Time zone: UTC−3 (BRT)

Tapejara, Paraná is a municipality in the state of Paraná in the Southern Region of Brazil.

== See also ==
- List of municipalities in Paraná
