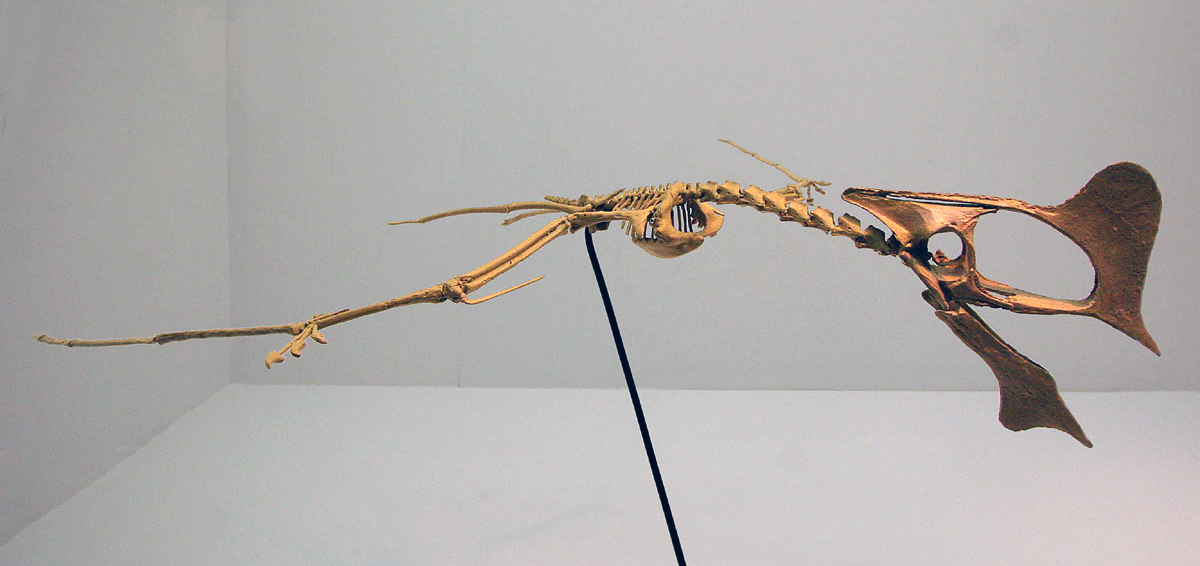
- Reconstructed skeleton

Scientific classification
- Kingdom: Animalia
- Phylum: Chordata
- Class: Reptilia
- Order: †Pterosauria
- Suborder: †Pterodactyloidea
- Clade: †Azhdarchoidea
- Family: †Tapejaridae
- Tribe: †Tapejarini
- Genus: †Tapejara; Kellner, 1989
- Species: †T. wellnhoferi

Binomial name
- †Tapejara wellnhoferi Kellner, 1989

= Tapejara wellnhoferi =

Tapejara wellnhoferi Temporal range: Aptian–Albian, 112 Ma

Genus of tapejarid pterosaur

Tapejara (from a Tupi word meaning "the lord of the path") is a genus of pterosaur from the Cretaceous period of Brazil, known from the Santana Group, which dates to approximately 127–112 million years ago. It had a distinctive semicircular crest above the snout and a bony projection extending backward from the head. Tapejara was a relatively small pterosaur, with an estimated wingspan of 1.23–1.3 meters (4.0–4.3 ft).

== History of discovery ==
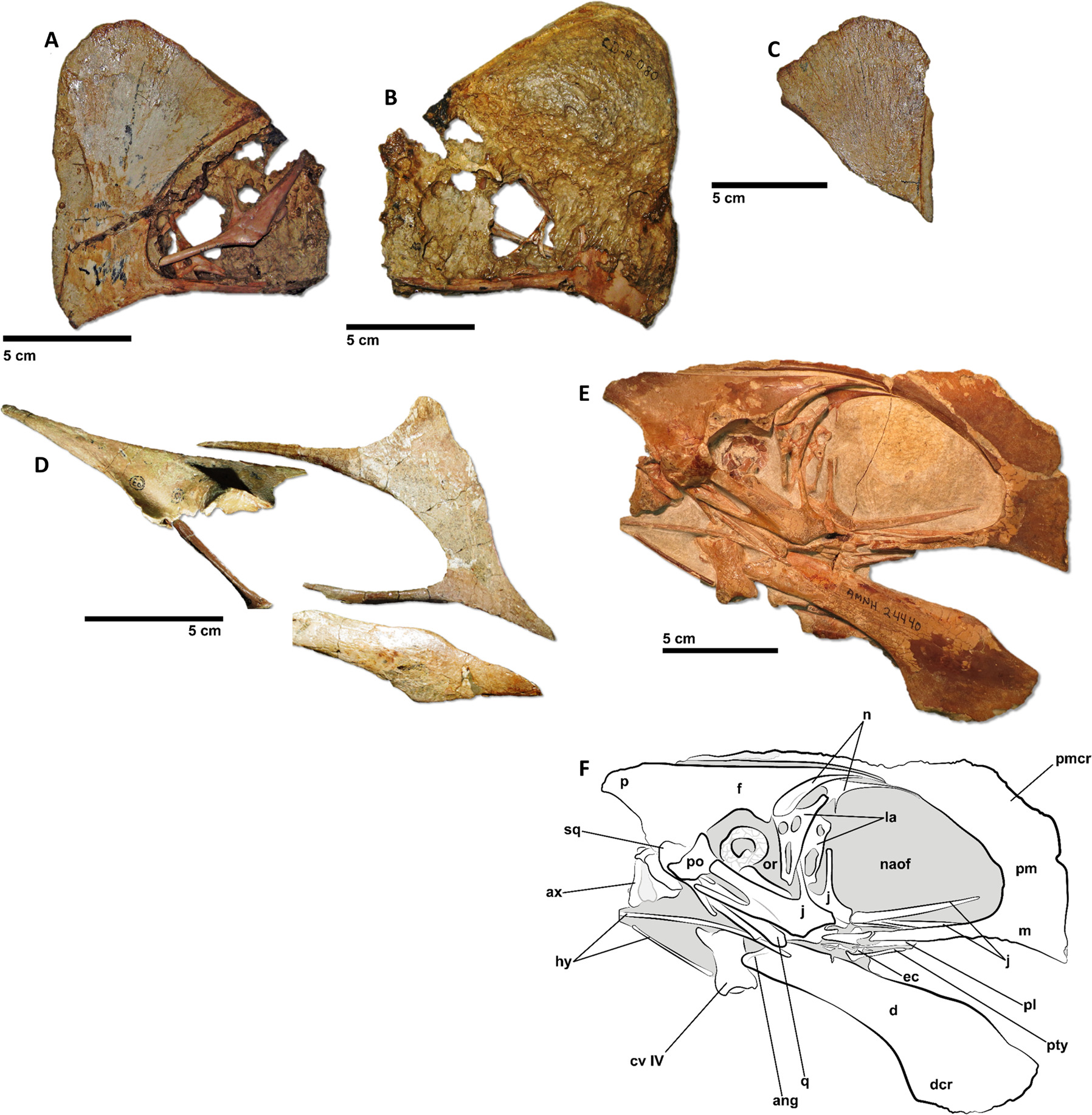
Holotype (A-C) and assigned specimens

The holotype of Tapejara (MN 6595-V, originally catalogued as CD-R 080) consists of a partial skull. It was described in 1989 by Alexander W. A. Kellner, who recognised it as a new genus and species. Kellner named it Tapejara wellnhoferi, ostensibly translating to "Wellnhofer's old being". However, the name actually derives from the Tupí-Guaraní tape ("path") and jara ("lord"), and therefore, T. wellnhoferi actually translates to "Wellnhofer's lord of the path".

Another, more complete specimen, AMNH 24440, was discovered in the same year as Kellner's original description, in a calcareous concretion. The provenance of this specimen is unclear, though it likely comes from either the Jardim or Santana do Cariri localities. AMNH 24440 consists of a partial skull, a partial mandible (lower jaw) and an anterior (front) cervical (neck) vertebra. In 2011, another, SMNK PAL 1137, was described, also found in a concretion. This specimen consists of a fairly complete premaxillo-maxilla, a unit consisting of the fused premaxillae and maxillae, and much of the braincase. The locality from which it originates is uncertain, though given that the concretion was originally blue, it likely comes from the Sierra de Maosina locality, part of the Romualdo Formation of the Santana Group.

In 2018, the National Museum of Brazil, where the holotype of T. wellnhoferi and many other Brazilian pterosaurs were located, suffered a major fire. While some specimens were lost, several were recovered from the debris, including the T. wellnhoferi holotype, but its state of preservation is unknown. A catalogue documenting recovered specimens is under preparation.

== Classification ==
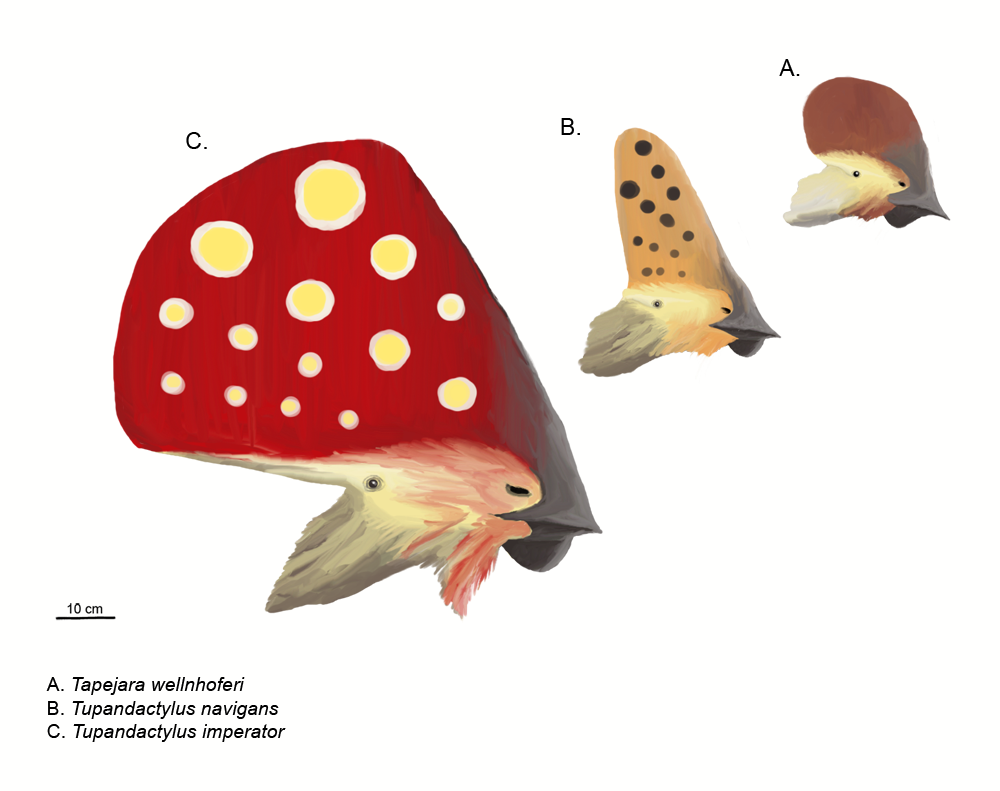
Reconstructed profiles of Tapejara wellnhoferi (A), Tupandactylus navigans (B) and Tupandactylus imperator (C), with hypothetical markings

The type species and only one currently recognized as valid by most researchers, is T. wellnhoferi. The specific name honors German paleontologist Peter Wellnhofer. Two larger species, originally named Tapejara imperator and Tapejara navigans, were later also placed in the genus Tapejara upon discovery. However, several studies have shown that T. imperator and T. navigans are significantly different from T. wellnhoferi and therefore were reclassified into new genera. The species T. imperator was given its own genus, Tupandactylus, by Alexander Kellner and Diogenes de Almeida Campos. Unwin and Martill found that T. imperator and T. navigans belong in the same genus, and named them Ingridia imperator and I. navigans, respectively. This genus name honored Wellnhofer's late wife Ingrid.

Because Tupandactylus was named first, it retained priority over the name Ingridia. To complicate matters, both the name Tupandactylus and Ingridia used the former Tapejara imperator as their type species. The scientists who described Tupandactylus did not name a Tupandactylus navigans (but instead suggested it was synonymous to Tupandactylus imperator), and Tapejara navigans was not formally reclassified as a distinct species of Tupandactylus until 2011.

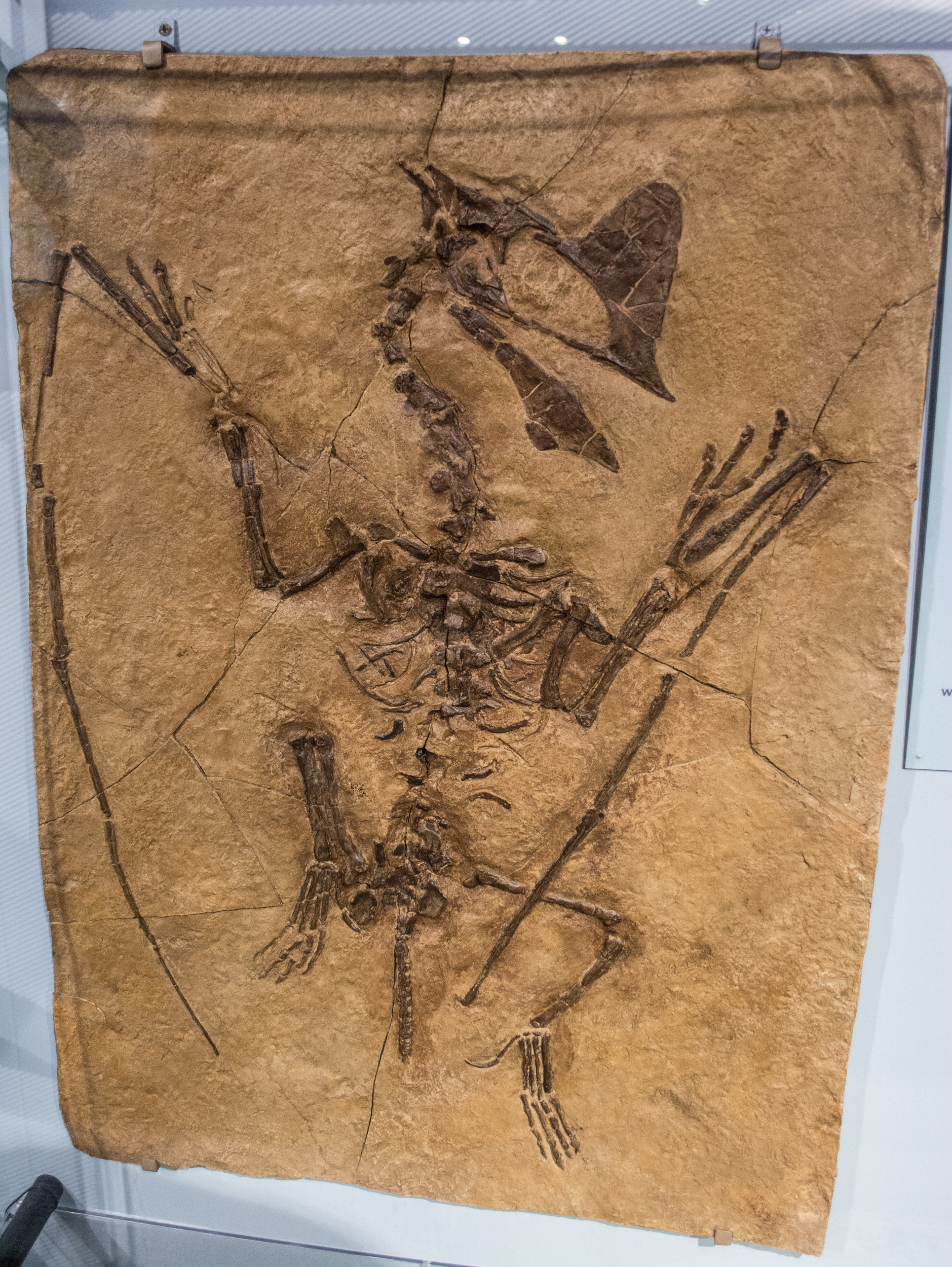
Cast

The cladogram below follows a phylogenetic analysis by Kellner, the describer of Tapejara, and colleagues in 2019. They recovered Tapejara within the Tapejarini (a tribe within the family Tapejaridae), sister taxon to three other genera: Europejara, Caiuajara and Tupandactylus.

- Tapejaromorpha
  - Keresdrakon vilsoni
  - Tapejaridae
    - Thalassodrominae
      - Thalassodromeus sethi
      - Tupuxuara leonardii
    - Tapejarinae
      - Caupedactylus ybaka
      - - Aymberedactylus cearensis
        - - - Eopteranodon lii
            - "Huaxiapterus" benxiensis
            - "Huaxiapterus" corollatus
            - Sinopterus dongi
          - Tapejarini
            - Europejara olcadesorum
            - Caiuajara dobruskii
            - Tapejara wellnhoferi
            - Tupandactylus imperator

== Paleobiology ==
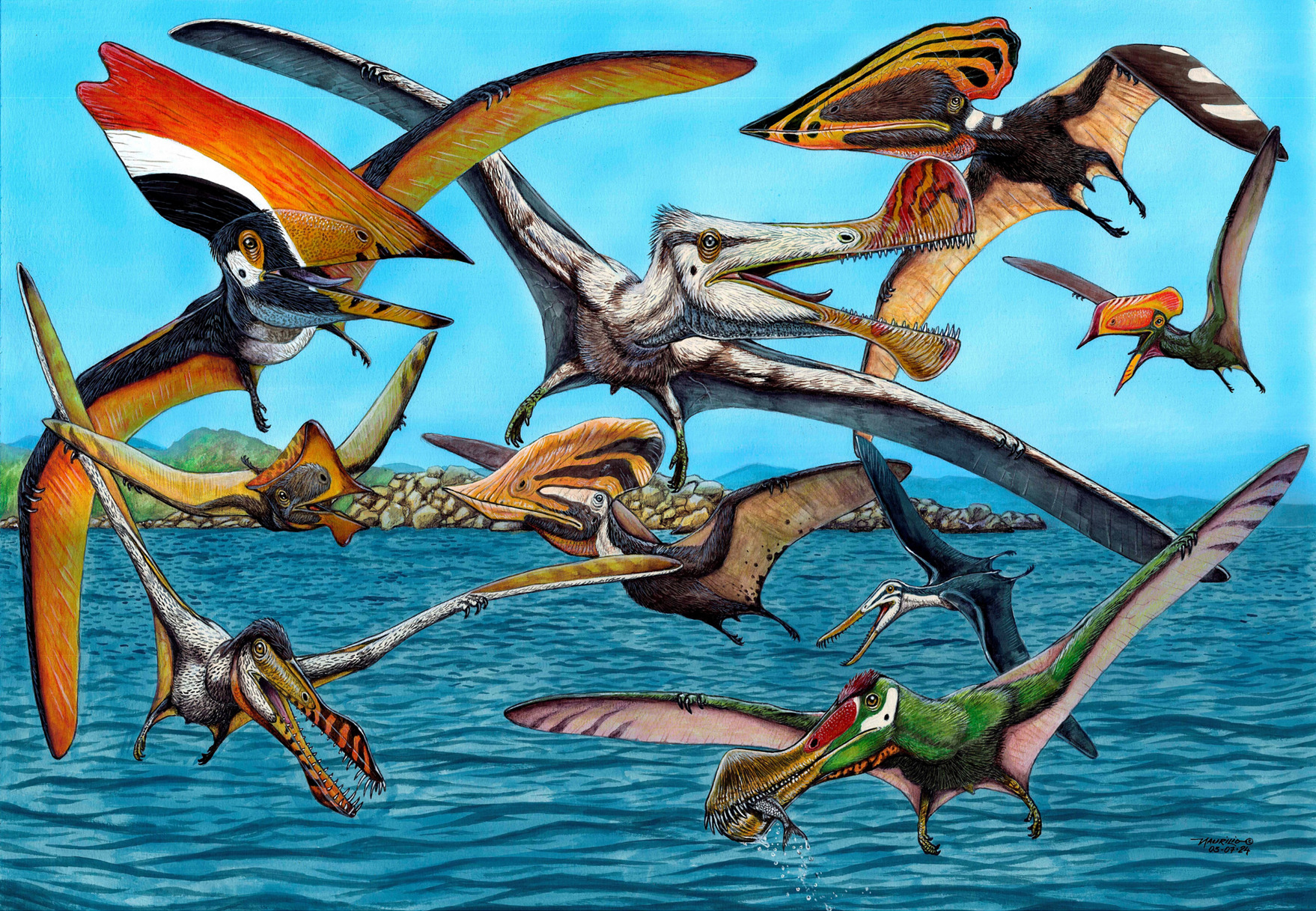
Life restorations of Tapejara (middle left) and other pterosaurs known from the Romualdo Formation

Comparisons between the scleral rings of Tapejara and modern birds and reptiles suggest that it may have been cathemeral, active throughout the day at short intervals.

== See also ==
- List of pterosaur genera
- Timeline of pterosaur research
