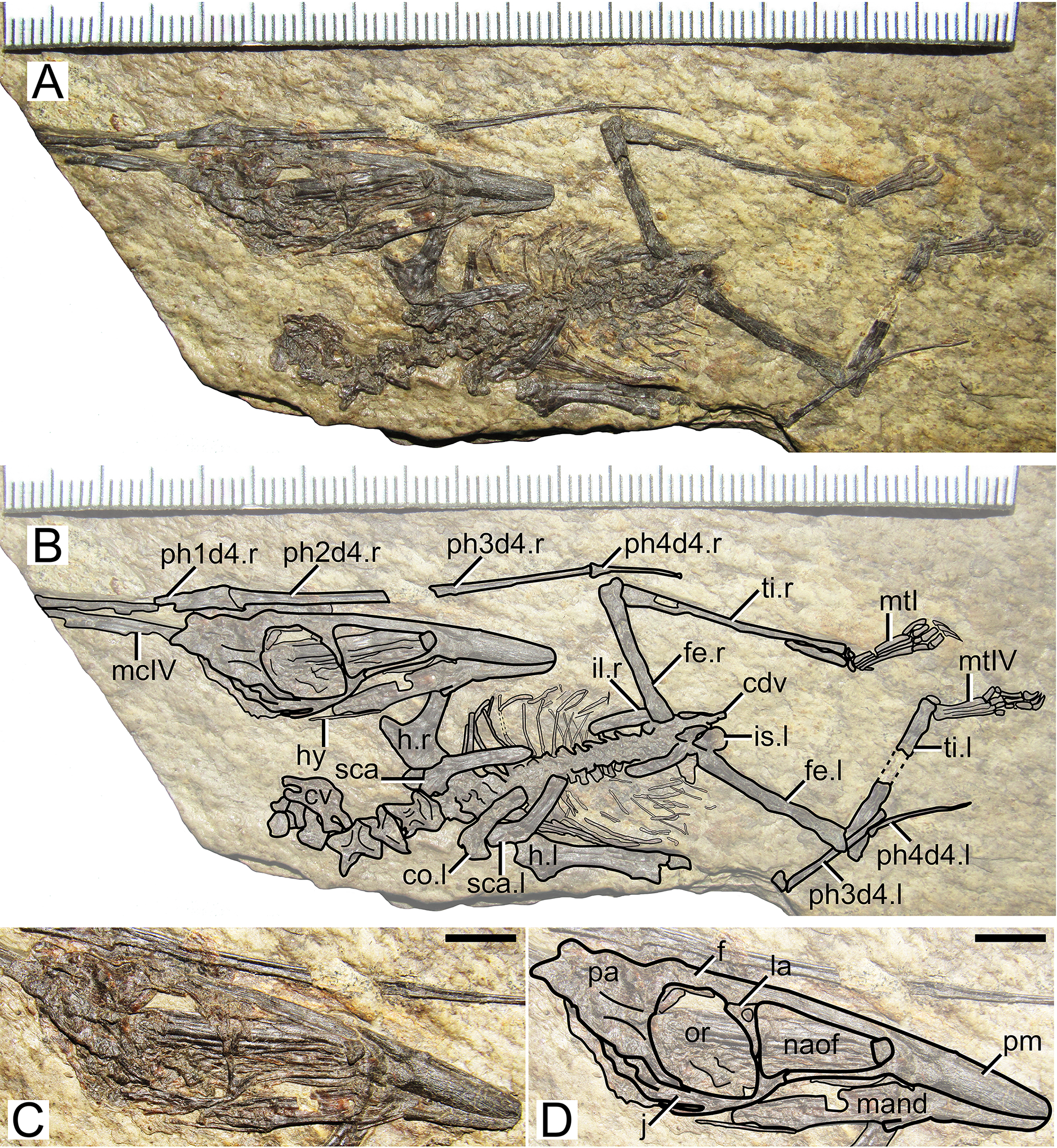
- Holotype specimen

Scientific classification
- Kingdom: Animalia
- Phylum: Chordata
- Order: †Pterosauria
- Suborder: †Pterodactyloidea
- Clade: †Azhdarchoidea
- Clade: †Tapejaromorpha
- Genus: †Nemicolopterus; Wang et al., 2008

Type species
- †Nemicolopterus crypticus Wang et al., 2008

= Nemicolopterus =

Nemicolopterus Temporal range: Early Cretaceous, 120 Ma

Genus of tapejaromorph pterosaur from the Early Cretaceous

Nemicolopterus is a dubious genus of tapejaromorph pterosaur, based on a very small specimen originally described as the smallest known adult pterosaur to date. It lived in the Jehol Biota 120 million years ago. It has since been argued that Nemicolopterus represents a juvenile or hatchling of Sinopterus.

== Discovery and naming ==
The generic name "Nemicolopterus" comes from the following Ancient Greek words: "Nemos" meaning "forest", "ikolos" meaning "dweller", and "pteron" meaning "wing". The specific name crypticus is from "kryptos", meaning "hidden". Thus "Nemicolopterus crypticus" means "Hidden flying forest dweller".

== Description ==
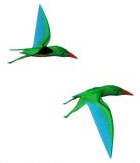
Life restoration

The type fossil specimen of N. crypticus, catalog number IVPP V-14377, is housed in the collection of the Institute of Vertebrate Paleontology and Paleoanthropology in Beijing, China. The fossil was collected from the Jiufotang Formation, which is of Aptian age (120 mya). It was discovered in the Luzhhouou locality of Yaolugou Town, Jianchang County, Huludao City, western Liaoning Province in northeastern China. It has a wingspan of slightly under 25 centimeters (10 in), making it smaller than all but a few specimens of hatchling pterosaurs. Wang et al. (2008), who originally described the specimen, concluded that it was immature, citing the amount of bone fusion and the ossification of the toes, gastralia, and sternum as indicating that it was a sub-adult rather than a hatchling. However, Darren Naish argued on his popular weblog that, due to the hypothesis that pterosaurs were highly precocial, bone fusion and ossification could have occurred very early in life, and that Nemicolopterus might in fact be a hatchling individual of the genus Sinopterus. This identification was formally presented in 2021 study, which found that Nemicolopterus fit into a growth series as a young juvenile or hatchling Sinopterus.

== Classification ==
An analysis of pterosaur relationships by Andres and colleagues in 2014 found the specimen in a sister group relationship with "Sinopterus" gui.

A 2023 revision of Sinopterus concluded that it was impossible to assign the Nemicolopterus specimen to either Sinopterus or the new genus Huaxiadraco, and it was therefore considered an indeterminate sinopterine.

== See also ==
- List of pterosaur genera
- Timeline of pterosaur research
- Pterosaur size
- Smallest organisms
