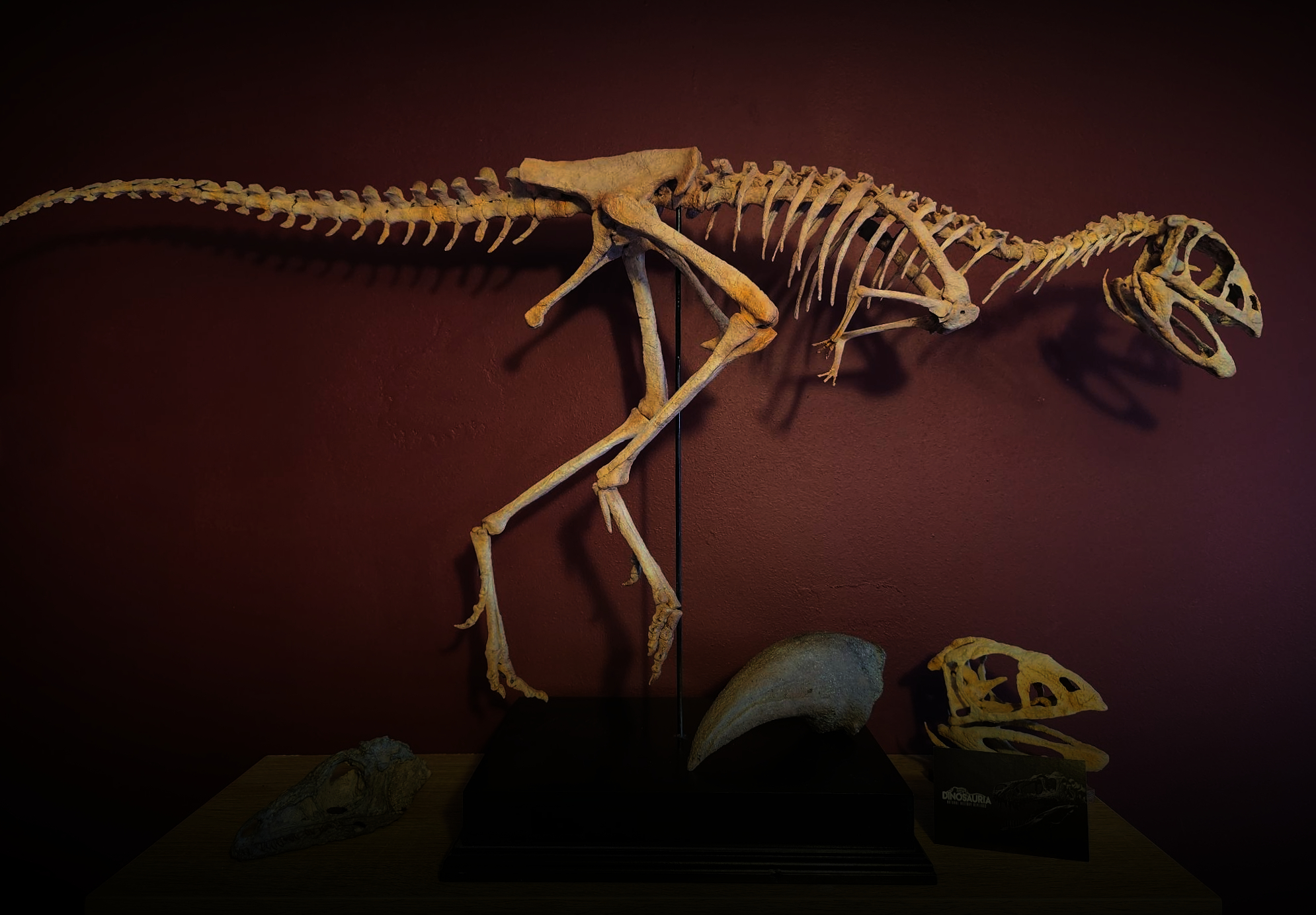
- Reconstructed mounted skeleton

Scientific classification
- Kingdom: Animalia
- Phylum: Chordata
- Clade: Dinosauria
- Clade: Saurischia
- Clade: Theropoda
- Clade: †Berthasauridae
- Genus: †Berthasaura de Souza et al., 2021

Type species
- †Berthasaura leopoldinae de Souza et al., 2021

= Berthasaura =

Berthasaura Temporal range: Early Cretaceous (Aptian–Albian)

Genus of ceratosaurian theropod dinosaurs

Berthasaura (meaning "Bertha's lizard") is an extinct genus of ceratosaurian theropod dinosaurs from the Early Cretaceous Goio-Erê Formation of Paraná, Brazil. The genus contains a single species, Berthasaura leopoldinae, known from a nearly complete skeleton.

== Discovery and naming ==
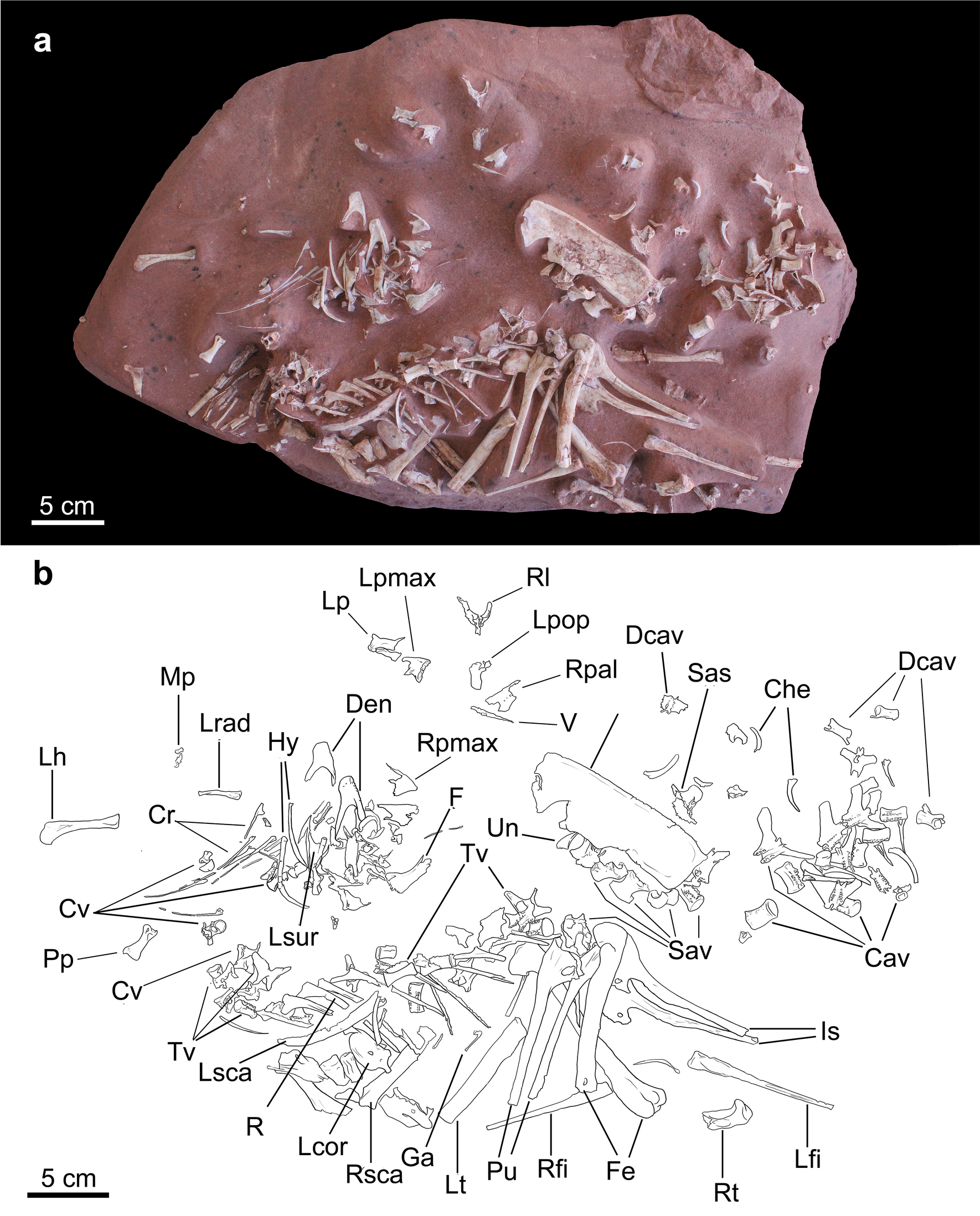
Holotype specimen

Between 2011 and 2015, paleontologists working at the Cemitério dos Pterossauros site near Cruzeiro do Oeste discovered the skeletons of the pterosaurs Caiuajara, Keresdrakon and Torukjara as well as remains of small theropods. One of these was in 2019 named and described as Vespersaurus but a second species proved to be present.

In 2021, the type species Berthasaura leopoldinae was named and described by Geovane Alves de Souza, Marina Bento Soares, Luiz Carlos Weinschütz, Everton Wilner, Ricardo Tadeu Lopes, Olga Maria Oliveira de Araújo and Alexander Wilhelm Armin Kellner. The generic name Berthasaura refers to the scientist and women's rights activist Bertha Maria Júlia Lutz, while the specific name honors Maria Leopoldina, the first Empress of Brazil; the bicentennial of Brazil's independence was in 2022, close to when the dinosaur was described. Indirectly this also refers to the Imperatriz Leopoldinense samba school; for the 2018 carnival, they developed the theme of Uma noite real no Museu Nacional (Portuguese: A royal night in the National Museum); in September of that year a catastrophic fire would destroy much of its collection.

== Description ==
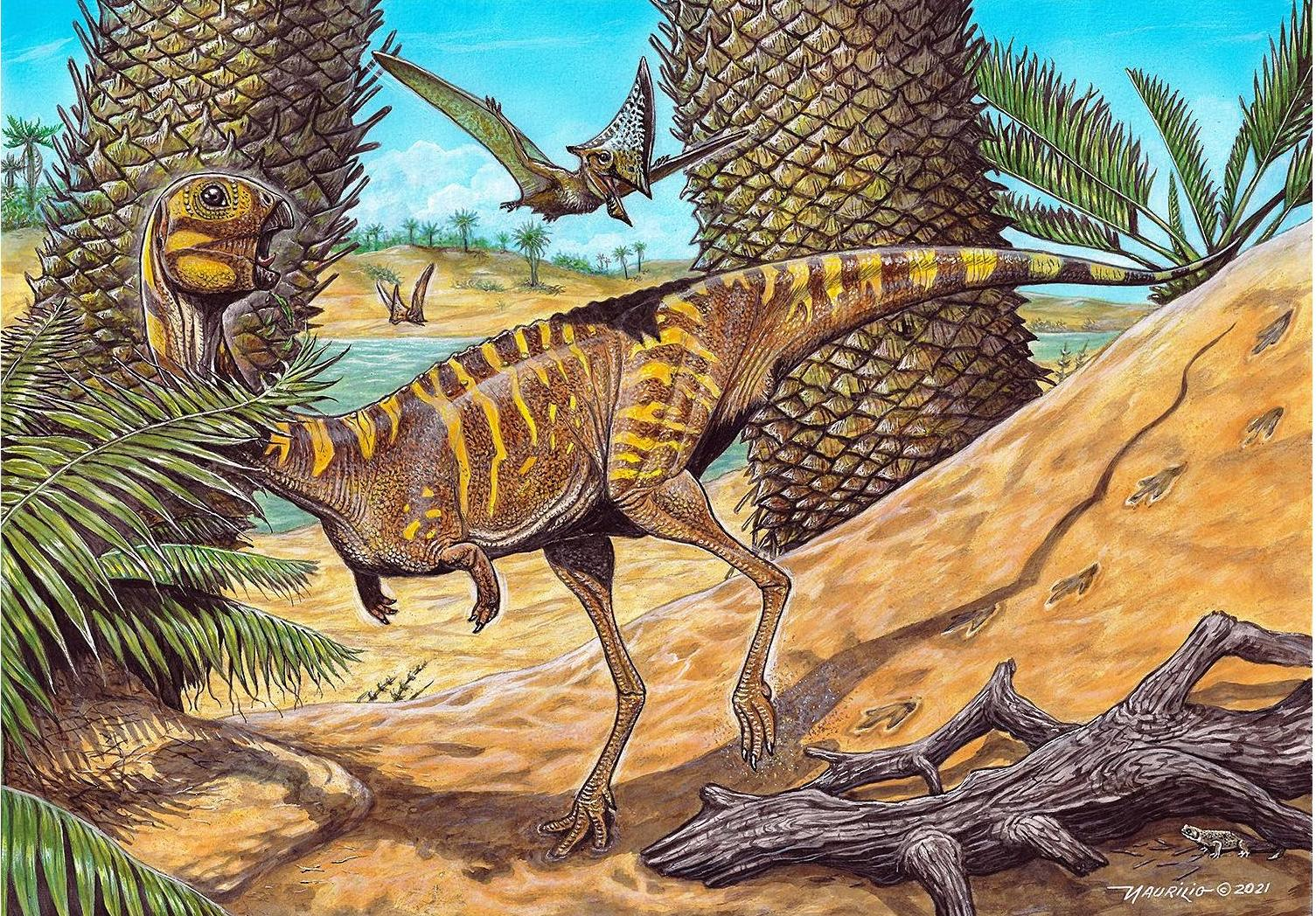
Speculative life restoration

The holotype, MN 7821-V, is a nearly complete disarticulated skeleton around 1 metre (3.3 ft) long, likely representing a subadult based on histology of the femur, tibia and fibula. Excavated between 2011 and 2015, the specimen is one of the most complete dinosaur fossils known from the Cretaceous Brazil, preserving the most complete axial series of any noasaurid known to date. However, like Limusaurus, it had teeth as a juvenile but lost them in adulthood.

== Classification ==
Berthasaura was placed by de Souza and colleagues as the basalmost noasaurid, distantly related to Limusaurus.

- Ceratosauria
  - Berberosaurus
  - - Ceratosauridae
      - Genyodectes
      - Ceratosaurus
    - - Abelisauridae
      - Noasauridae
        - Berthasaura
        - - Deltadromeus
          - - Afromimus
            - Masiakasaurus
            - Noasaurus
            - Velocisaurus
            - Vespersaurus
            - - MNN tig6 (cf. Spinostropheus)
              - - Limusaurus
                - - CCG 20011
                  - Elaphrosaurus

In their 2024 phylogenetic analysis, Hendrickx et al. recovered Berthasaura in a clade also including Austrocheirus and Afromimus (both of which have debated affinities within Theropoda), which they named Berthasauridae. They found berthasaurids to nest outside of the Noasauridae, as the sister taxon to abelisauroids. Their results are displayed in the cladogram below:

- Ceratosauria
  - Kryptops (postcranium)
  - - Elaphrosaurinae
    - Neoceratosauria
      - Ceratosauridae
      - - Berberosaurus
        - - Eoabelisaurus
          - - Ligabueino
            - - Berthasauridae
                - Berthasaura
                - Afromimus
                - Austrocheirus
              - Abelisauroidea
                - Noasauridae
                - Abelisauridae

== Palaeobiology ==
=== Palaeoecology ===
The toothless, short beak of Berthasaura suggests that this genus was a herbivore or at least an omnivore, unlike most other ceratosaurs except for adult Limusaurus. Because the holotype represents an immature individual, it has been suggested that Berthasaura was herbivorous throughout its entire life, unlike Limusaurus. However, new fossil finds have shown that Berthasaura did possess teeth during the juvenile stage of its life history, and it also reveals that it evolved several adaptations convergent with those of oviraptorids.

== Paleoenvironment ==
Berthasaura lived in the Goio-Erê Formation, which was an ancient desert. Its dating is uncertain; de Souza and colleagues believe it was deposited during the Aptian-Albian, but other authors have discussed the controversial unresolved age. Other animals recovered from this formation include the pterosaurs Caiuajara, Keresdrakon and Torukjara, as well as the lizard Gueragama.
