= Goio-Erê Formation =

Geological formation in Brazil

- Stratigraphic range: Aptian-Campanian? ~125–71 Ma
- Type: Geological formation
- Unit of: Caiuá Group (Bauru Basin)
- Underlies: Alluvium
- Overlies: Unconformity with Lower Cretaceous rocks

Lithology
- Primary: Sandstone

Location
- Coordinates: 23.8°S 53.1°W
- Approximate paleocoordinates: 28.9°S 32.7°W
- Country: Brazil
- Extent: Bauru Sub-basin, Paraná Basin
- Goio-Erê Formation (Brazil)

The Goio-Erê Formation is a geological formation in Brazil. It is sometimes thought to be deposited between the Turonian and Campanian stages of the Late Cretaceous, but an Aptian-Albian date has also been proposed. It primarily consists of sandstone and was deposited in a desert environment. It is known for its exceptional 3-D preservation of fossils at the Cemitério dos Pterossauros ("Pterosaur Graveyard") Quarry, located in the municipality of Cruzeiro do Oeste. Animals recovered from this site include the pterosaurs Keresdrakon, Caiuajara and Torukjara, the dinosaurs Berthasaura and Vespersaurus, and the iguanian lizard Gueragama. A few studies have alternatively assigned the Cemitério dos Pterossauros site to the younger Rio Paraná Formation, however.

== Fossil content ==
=== Dinosaurs ===
Dinosaurs from the Goio-Erê Formation
Genus	Species	Location	Stratigraphic position	Material	Notes	Images
Berthasaura	B. leopoldinae	Cemitério dos Pterossauros Quarry			A berthasaurid ceratosaur.	
Vespersaurus	V. paranaensis	Cemitério dos Pterossauros Quarry			A noasaurid ceratosaur.	

=== Pterosaurs ===
Pterosaurs from the Goio-Erê Formation
Genus	Species	Location	Stratigraphic position	Material	Notes	Images
Caiuajara	C. dobruskii	Cemitério dos Pterossauros Quarry			A tapejarid pterosaur.	
Keresdrakon	K. vilsoni	Cemitério dos Pterossauros Quarry			An azhdarchoid pterosaur.	
Torukjara	T. bandeirae	Cemitério dos Pterossauros Quarry			A tapejarid pterosaur.	

=== Squamates ===
Squamates from the Goio-Erê Formation
Genus	Species	Location	Stratigraphic position	Material	Notes	Images
Gueragama	G. sulamericana	Cemitério dos Pterossauros Quarry		Jaw fragments	An iguanian lizard.	
