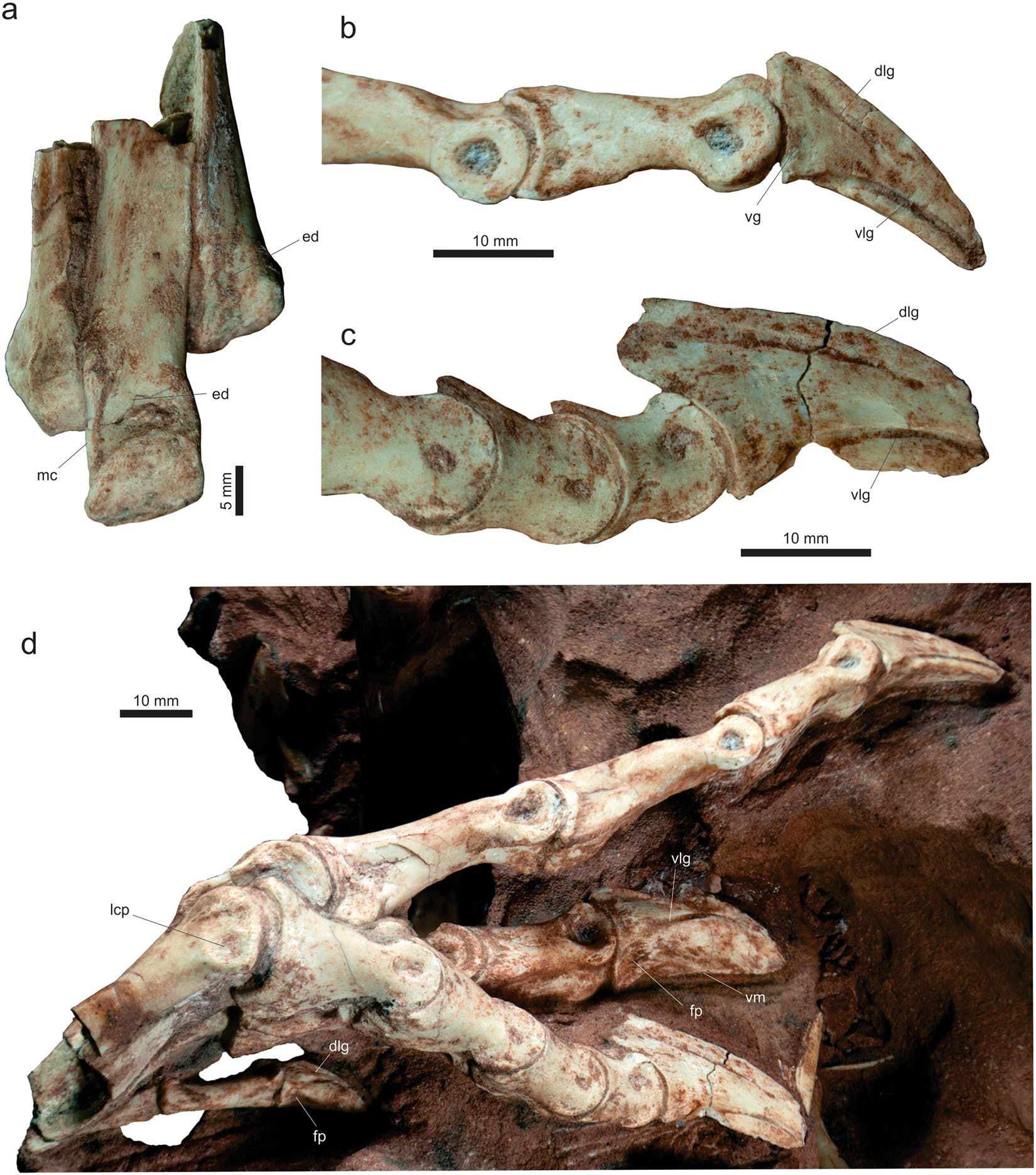
- Holotype foot bones

Scientific classification
- Kingdom: Animalia
- Phylum: Chordata
- Class: Reptilia
- Clade: Dinosauria
- Clade: Saurischia
- Clade: Theropoda
- Family: †Noasauridae
- Subfamily: †Noasaurinae
- Genus: †Vespersaurus; Langer et al., 2019

Type species
- Vespersaurus paranaensis Langer et al., 2019

= Vespersaurus =

Vespersaurus Temporal range: Cretaceous, Aptian–Campanian

Genus of noasaurine theropod dinosaur

Vespersaurus (meaning "western lizard") is a genus of noasaurid theropod dinosaur from the Cretaceous Rio Paraná Formation in the Paraná Basin, Brazil. The type and only species is V. paranaensis, which would have lived in the giant prehistoric Botucatu Desert.

== Discovery and naming ==
Location map

After the discovery of numerous skeletons of the pterosaurs Caiuajara and Keresdrakon at the Cemitério dos Pterossauros site near Cruzeiro do Oeste, the remains of small theropods were uncovered between 2011 and 2015. One of these was named and described in 2019 as Vespersaurus. The holotype, MPCO.V 0065d, was recovered from the Late Cretaceous period, found on dark red sandstones in the Rio Paraná Formation in the Paraná Basin, Brazil. Footprints belonging to Vespersaurus or a similar one-toed theropod were discovered near Cruzeiro do Oeste as early as the 1970s.

The generic name is derived from the Latin "vesper," meaning "evening/west," in reference to the town Cruzeiro do Oeste ("Western Cross") near which the fossils were found, and the Greek "sauros," meaning "lizard." The specific name refers to the Paraná state.

== Description ==
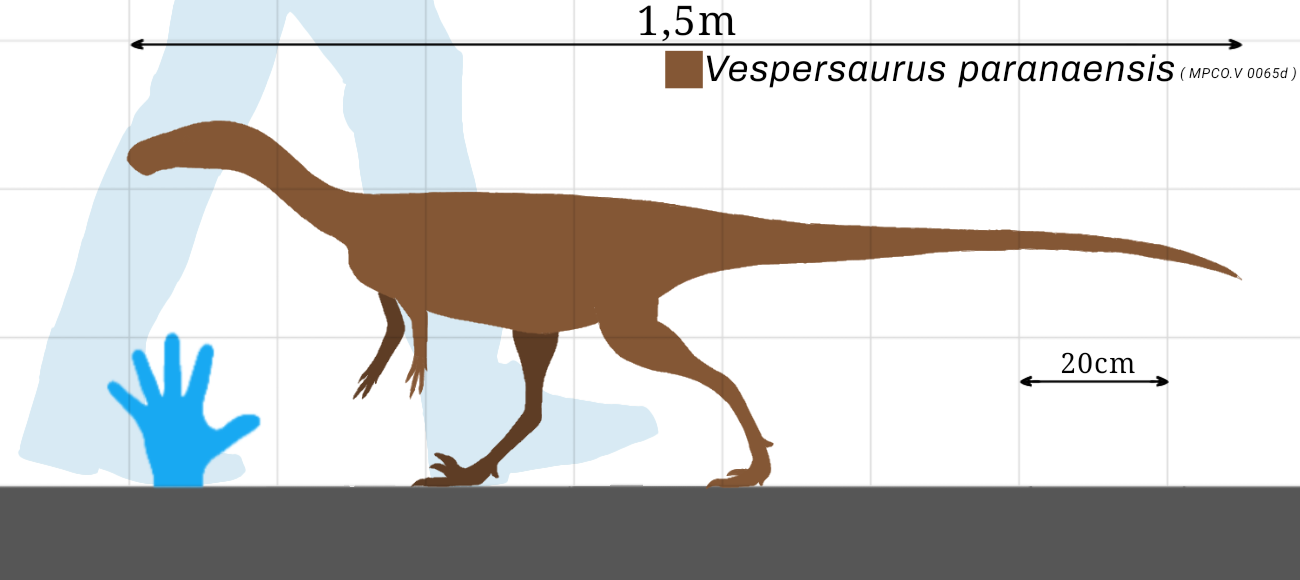
Size comparison

The taxon is notable for its distinct, functionally monodactyl foot anatomy, where the singularly large third digit would have borne most of the weight while walking. Based on the proportions of its holotype remains (MPCO.V 0065d), Vespersaurus was a small theropod with an estimated body length of 1–1.5 metres (3.3–4.9 ft). This makes it comparable in size to Noasaurus leali and Masiakasaurus knopfleri. The estimated body mass of Vespersaurus is 11.28 kilograms (24.9 lb), nearly that of the ornithischians Jeholosaurus shangyuanensis and Gasparinisaura cincosaltensis.

== Ichnology ==
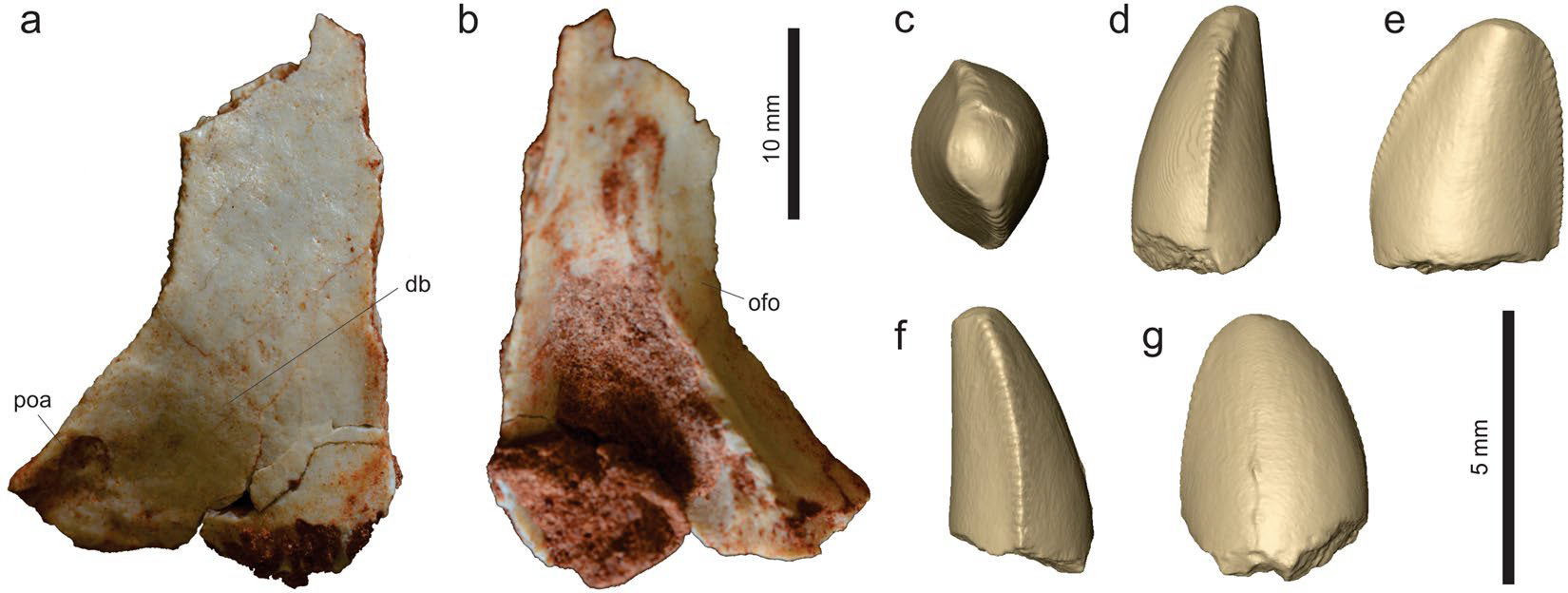
Frontal bone and tooth

Footprints pertaining to a functionally monodactyl dinosaur found near Cianorte were attributed to Vespersaurus or to a close relative. Those footprints were found in association with the ichnospecies Brasilichnium elusivum. It had been suggested that Vespersaurus footprints and/or Brasilichnium elusivum could have originated myths regarding footsteps of a saint near Cianorte. In 2023, Leonardi et al. described these footprints as belonging to a new ichnogenus and ichnospecies, which they named Farlowichnus rapidus. However, Navarro et al. (2025) questioned the noasaurid interpretation for the trackmaker of Farlowichnus due to the difference in pedal and ungual anatomy compared to those of Vespersaurus.

== Palaeobiology ==
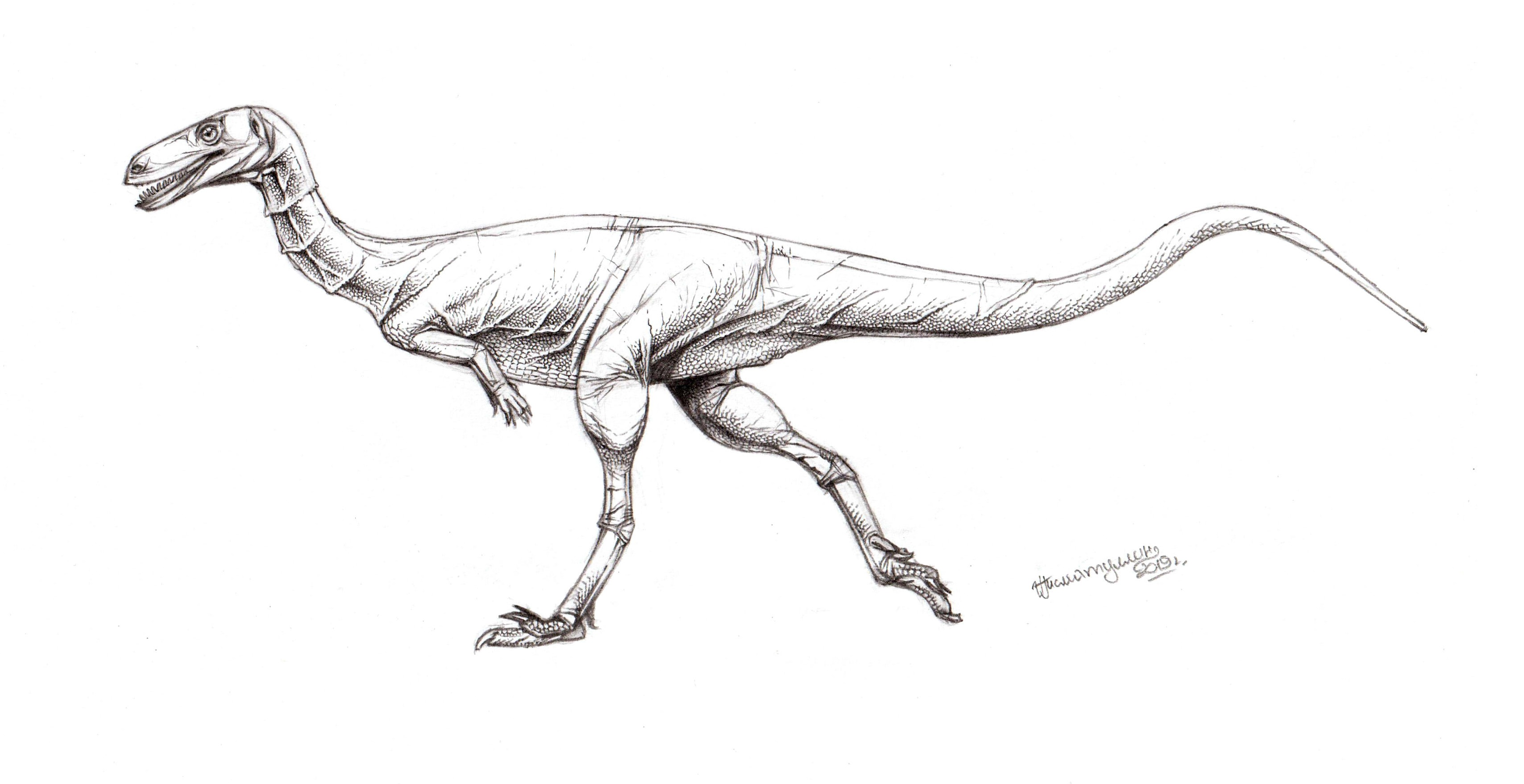
Life restoration

In 2023, Barbosa and colleagues tested Vespersaurus' tooth and two pedal unguals using a Finite Element Analysis. They found that the teeth were not well suited to handle struggling prey items, nor well-equipped to handle hard food items, having an ideal bite angle of 45 degrees. The stresses on the unguals, in contrast, were nearly identical throughout the three different scenarios they tested, indicating that the feet were not specialised for any particular task. Based on this, the team concluded that Vespersaurus did not fill a top predator niche in the Brazilian Caiua desert where it lived, but instead filled a more generalist niche, focussing on small prey items or having an opportunistic feeding strategy.

== See also ==
- Timeline of ceratosaur research
- Farlowichnus
