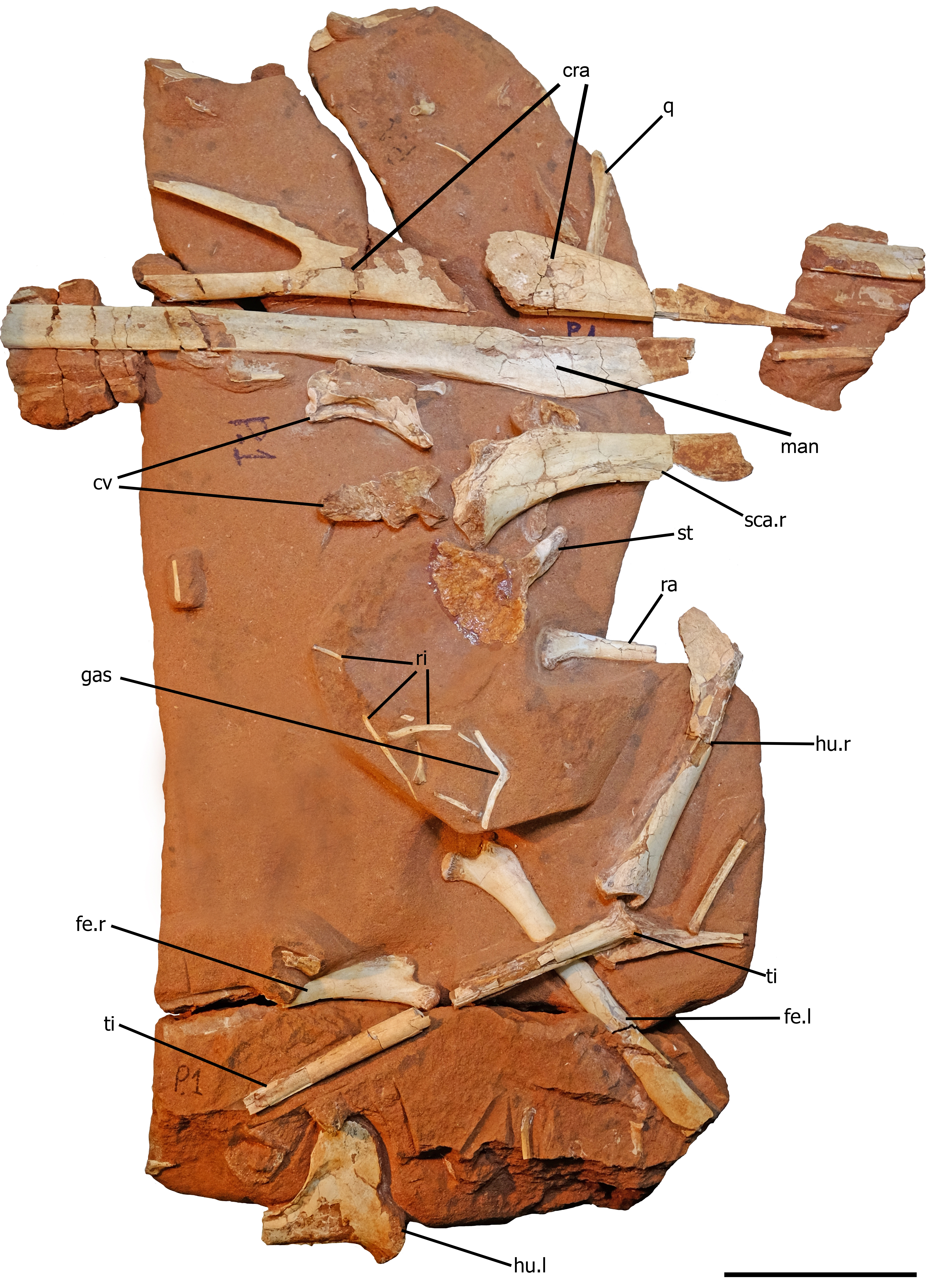
- Holotype specimen.

Scientific classification
- Kingdom: Animalia
- Phylum: Chordata
- Class: Reptilia
- Order: †Pterosauria
- Suborder: †Pterodactyloidea
- Clade: †Azhdarchoidea
- Genus: †Keresdrakon; Kellner et al. 2019

Type species
- †Keresdrakon vilsoni Kellner et al. 2019

= Keresdrakon =

Keresdrakon Temporal range: Barremian-Albian 125–100.5 Ma

Genus of azhdarchoid pterosaur from the Cretaceous period

Keresdrakon is an extinct genus of azhdarchoid pterosaur from the Goio-Erê Formation of Brazil, which dates back to the Early Cretaceous period (Aptian-Albian stages), 125 to 100.5 million years ago. Keresdrakon contains a single species, Keresdrakon vilsoni.

== Discovery ==
In 1971, Alexandre Dobruski and his son João Gustavo Dobruski, discovered a fossil site near Cruzeiro do Oeste in Paraná. Only in 2011, paleontologists Paulo César Manzig and Luiz C. Weinschütz visited the location. A bone bed proved to be present with hundreds of specimens of a pterosaur that in 2014 was named Caiuajara. Among them were some bones belonging to a second pterosaur species. These remains, both of Caiuajara and the new taxon, were prepared by volunteer Vilson Greinert.

In 2019, the type species Keresdrakon vilsoni was named and described by Alexander Wilhelm Armin Kellner, Luiz Carlos Weinschütz, Borja Holgado, Renan Alfredo Machado Bantim and Juliana Manso Sayão. The generic name combines the Keres, evil spirits from Greek mythology, with the Greek drakon, "dragon". The specific name honors Greinert. As the name appeared in an electronic publication, Life Science Identifiers were needed for its validity.

The holotype, CP.V 2069, was found in bonebed C, a sandstone layer. The strata in which the fossils have been discovered were initially thought to belong to the Rio Paraná Formation but later were assigned to the Goio-Erê Formation. The age of this formation is disputed; it could be as old as the Aptian but also as young as the Campanian. The holotype consists of a partial skeleton with skull. It contains the snout, a quadrate bone, the lower jaws, two neck vertebrae, four back vertebrae, the breastbone, belly ribs, the right shoulderblade, two humeri, a radius, two thighbones, a shinebone, the left ilium, the right pubic bone and the left ischium. The skeleton is not articulated. The bones have largely been three-dimensionally preserved, with little compression, and represent a subadult individual. Additional material from the same bonebed was assigned to the taxon as paratypes and referred material.

== Phylogeny ==
The phylogenetic analysis in the description recovered Keresdrakon as a tapejaromorph azhdarchoid, as the sister taxon to the rest of the clade.

- Azhdarchoidea
  - - Azhdarchidae
    - Chaoyangopteridae
  - Tapejaromorpha
    - Keresdrakon vilsoni
    - Tapejaridae
      - Thalassodrominae
        - Thalassodromeus sethi
        - Tupuxuara leonardii
      - Tapejarinae
        - Caupedactylus ybaka
        - - Aymberedactylus cearensis
          - - - Eopteranodon lii
              - "Huaxiapterus" benxiensis
              - "Huaxiapterus" corollatus
              - Sinopterus dongi
            - Tapejarini
              - Europejara olcadesorum
              - Caiuajara dobruskii
              - Tapejara wellnhoferi
              - Tupandactylus imperator

A 2022 study by Rubi Pêgas and colleagues recovered Keresdrakon as the sister taxon to Alanqa in a basal position among azhdarchoids.

- Tapejaroidea
  - Dsungaripteridae
  - Azhdarchoidea
    - Tapejaridae
    - Azhdarchomorpha
      - Alanqidae
        - Alanqa
        - Keresdrakon
      - - Chaoyangopteridae
        - - Radiodactylus
          - Azhdarchidae

== Ecology ==
The fossils of Keresdrakon were found in direct association with the tapejarid Caiuajara and the noasaurid theropod Vespersaurus, confirming that these species were sympatric. Among pterosaurs, this is the first direct evidence of sympatry, i.e. direct association instead of being found in the same stratigraphic unit. Of the three taxa in the bone beds, Caiuajara is the most common, and Keresdrakon is the least common. The lizard Gueragama and the noasaurid Berthasaura were also likely part of this paleocommunity. Sedimentological data indicates that the environment of the Goio-Erê Formation was a desert, and the azhdarchid-like rostrum of Keresdrakon implies it may have been an opportunistic predator in this environment.

== Gallery ==
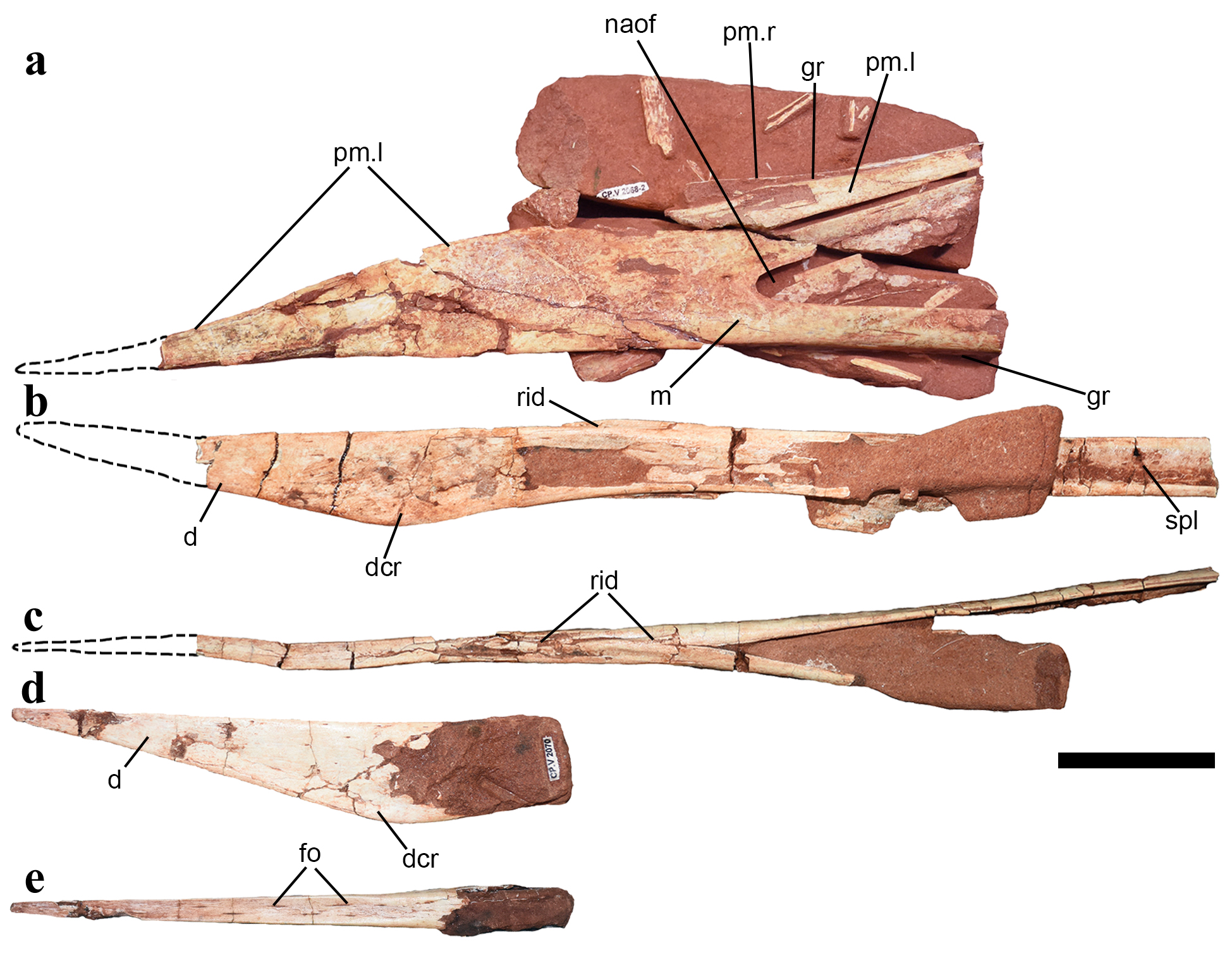
Skull fragments

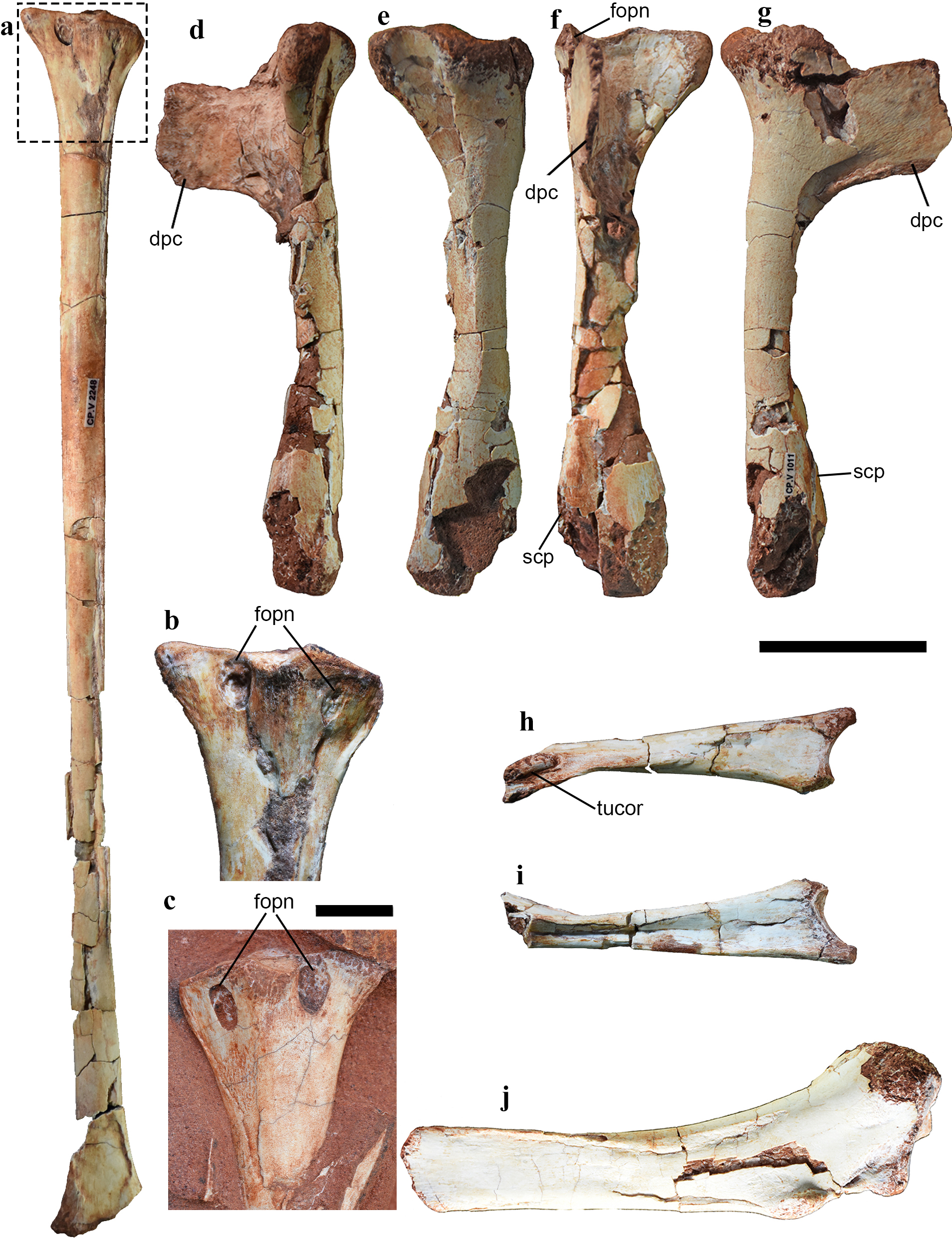
Forelimb fossils

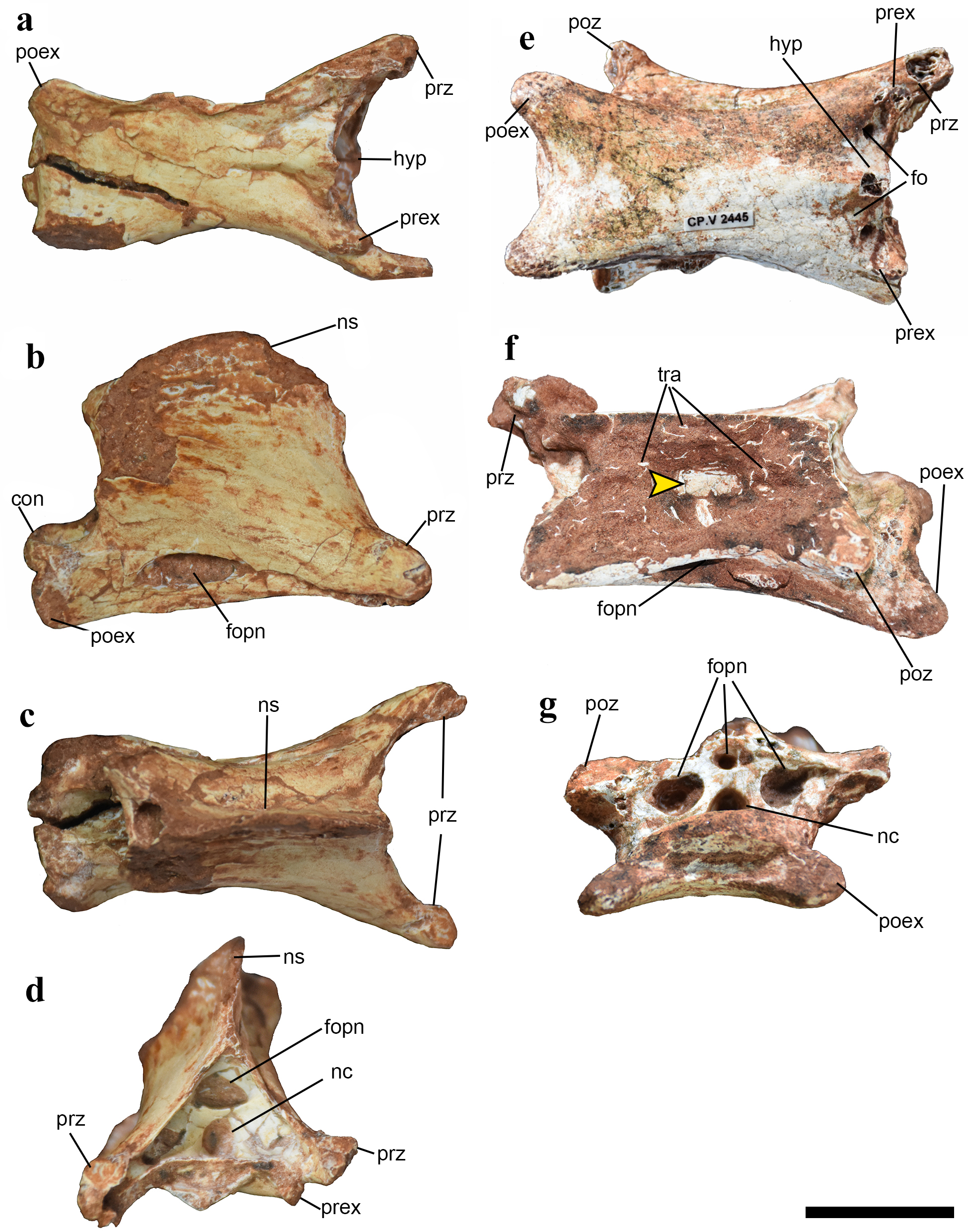
Cervical vertebrae

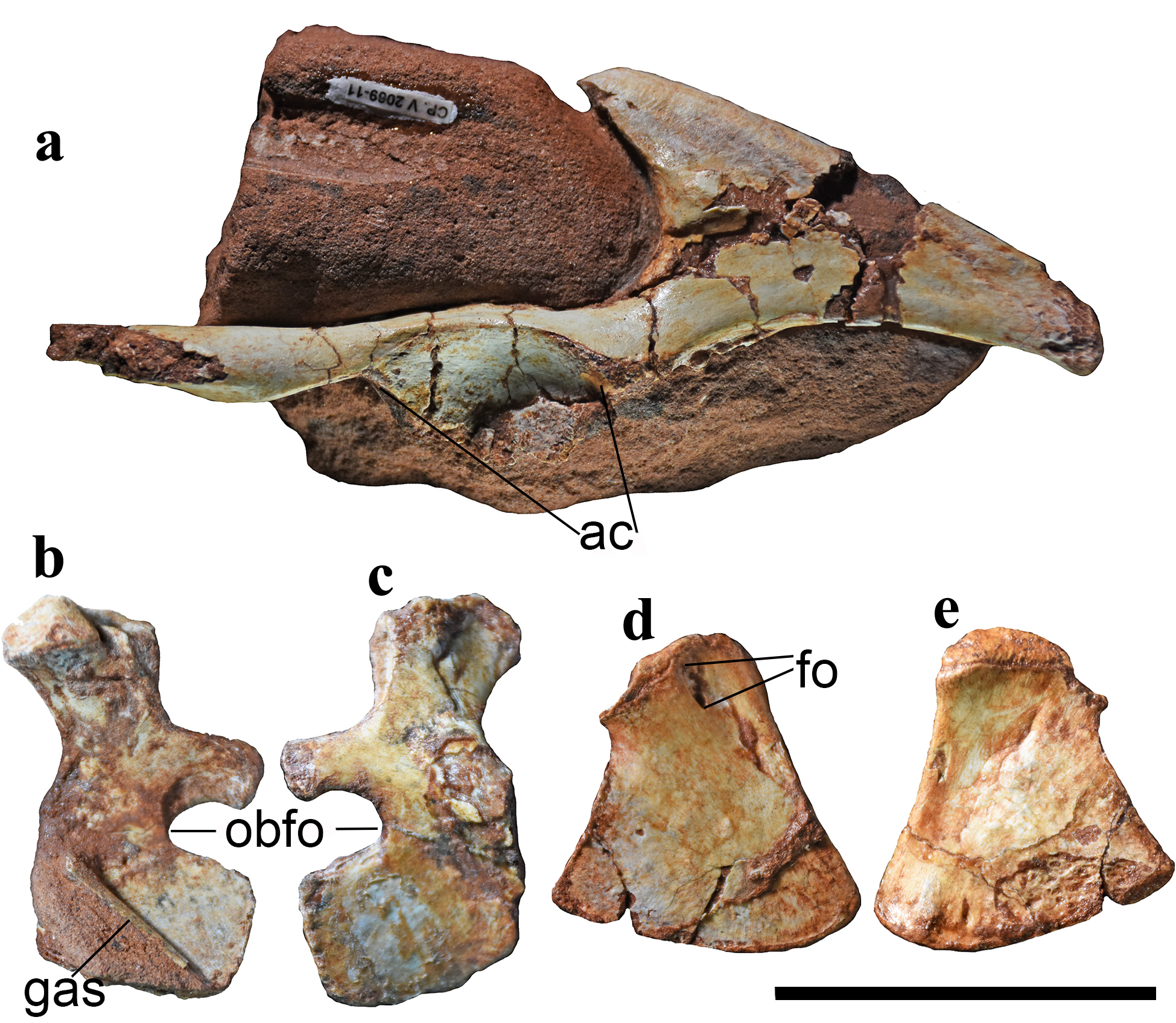
Hip fragments

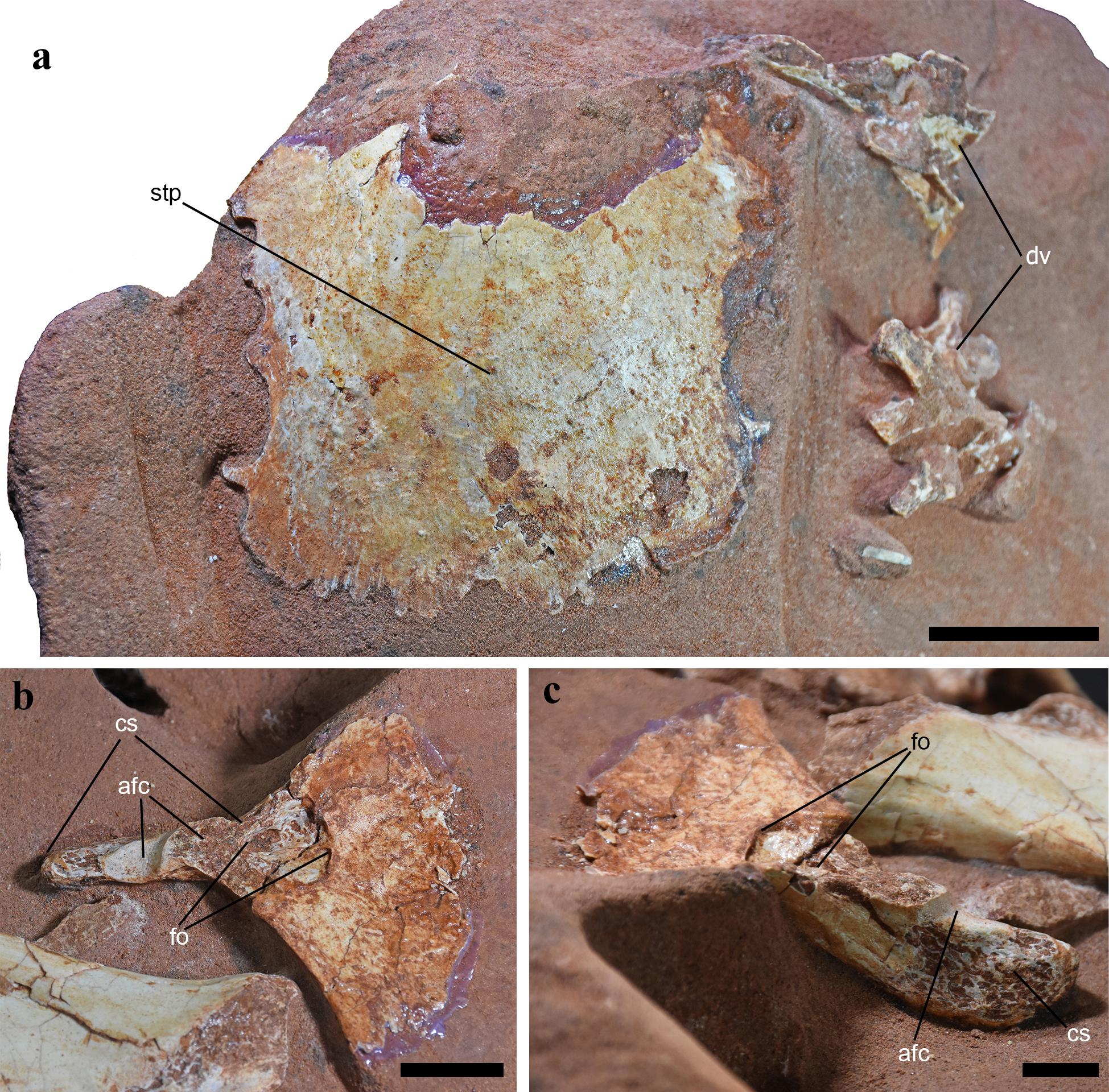
Sternum

== See also ==
- List of pterosaur genera
- Timeline of pterosaur research
- Pterosaur size
