= Farlowichnus =

Farlowichnus Temporal range: Early Cretaceous (Berriasian–Hauterivian)

Trace fossil classification
- Ichnogenus: Farlowichnus; Leonardi et al., 2023

Type ichnospecies
- †Farlowichnus rapidus Leonardi et al., 2023

Dinosaur footprint

Farlowichnus is an ichnogenus of small theropod dinosaur footprint. It includes a single species, F. rapidus, known from prints found in the Early Cretaceous Botucatu Formation of Brazil. Farlowichnus is known from several fossil trackways that indicate that it was likely a cursorial animal that was well-adapted to desert environments.

== Discovery and naming ==
The Farlowichnus fossil material was discovered in sediments of the Botucatu Formation (São Bento Quarry) near Araraquara in São Paulo, Brazil. The holotype specimen, LPP-IC-0200, consists of a slab with four footprints forming a trackway. Two paratypes that preserve similar footprints were also assigned, consisting of LPP-IC-0231 and MCT-R-1954.

In 2023, Farlowichnus rapidus was described by Giuseppe Leonardi, Marcelo A. Fernandes, Ismar S. Carvalho, Julia B. Schutzer, and Rafael C. da Silva as a new ichnogenus and ichnospecies of theropod footprints based on these fossil remains. The generic name, "Farlowichnus", combines a reference to James O. Farlow, a paleontologist who has studied ichnofossils, with the Greek "ίχνος" ("ichnos"), meaning "track". The specific name, "rapidus", references the hypothesized cursorial behavior and agile morphology of the taxon.

== Description ==
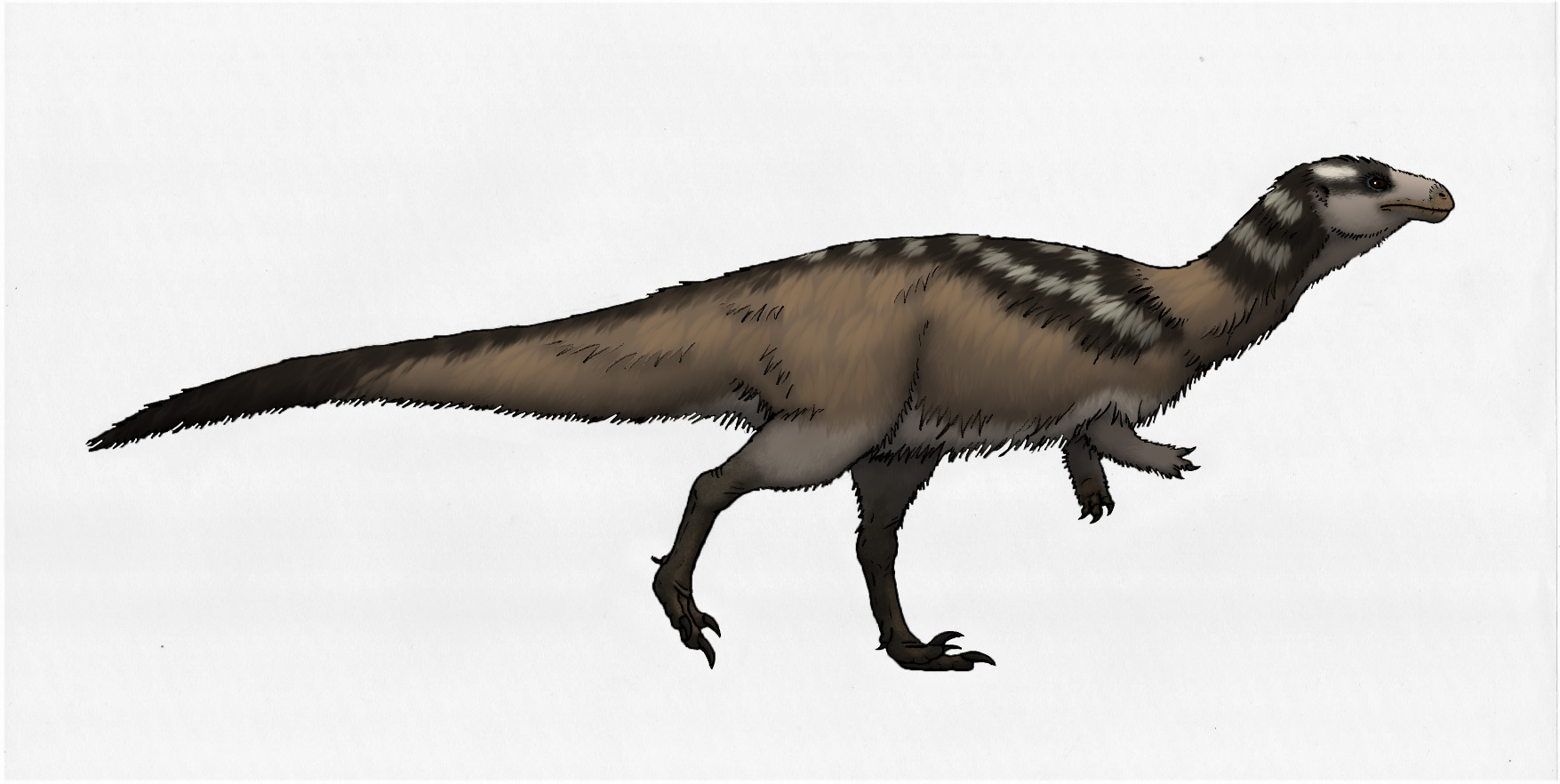
Life restoration of Vespersaurus, a possible relative of the Farlowichnus trackmaker

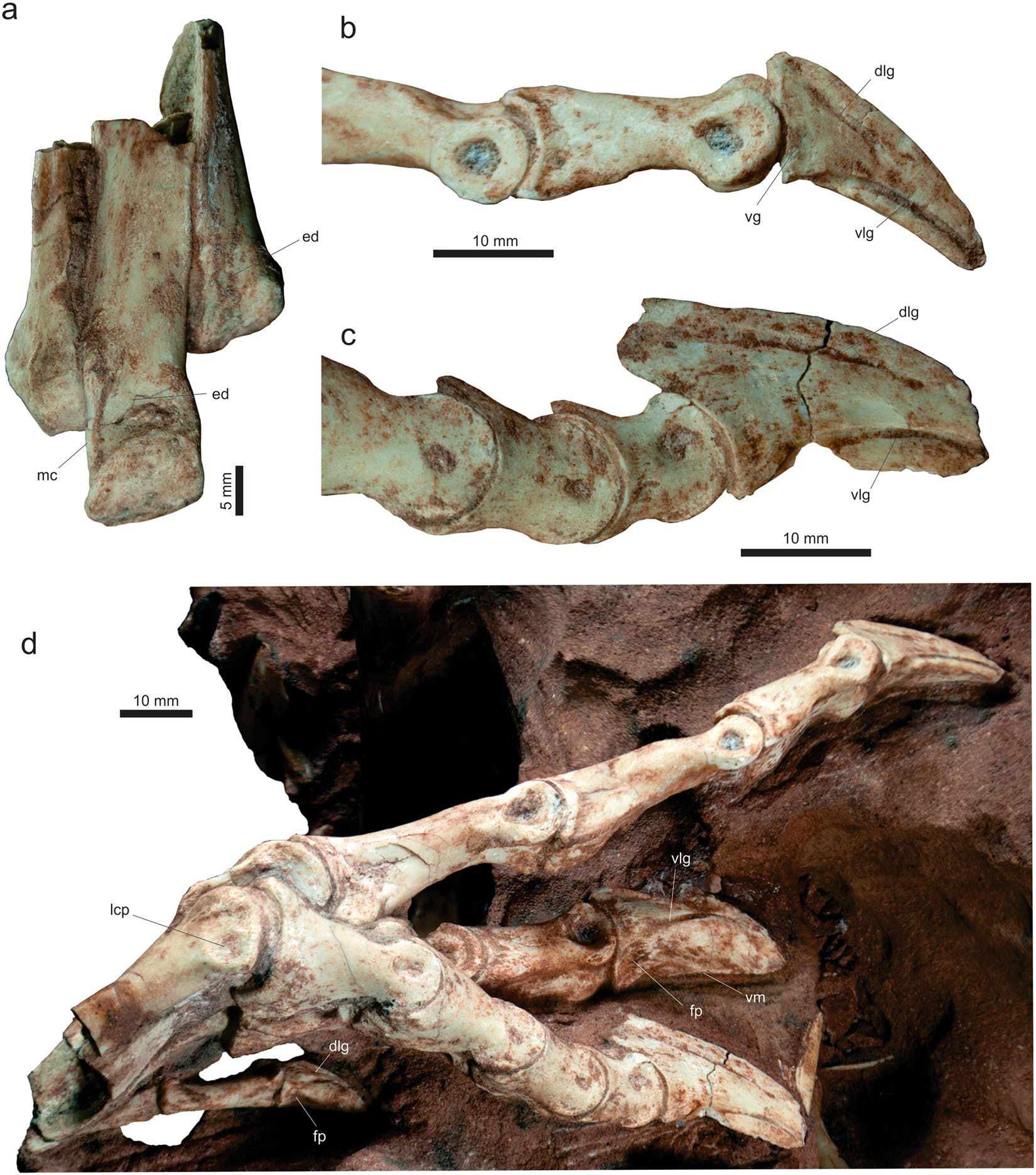
Holotype fossil of Vespersaurus, consisting of the bones of the right foot

Leonardi et al. (2023) described the general morphology of the Farlowichnus footprints as "waterdrop"-shaped. The impressions of the third digit of Farlowichnus are significantly longer than the second and fourth digits, which are proportionately much shorter. This morphology, as well as the observed long strides and high step angle, are associated with a cursorial behavior. Although the footprints are structurally tridactyl, or the imprints of three toes are visible, Farlowichnus was likely functionally monodactylous. The foot shape also indicates adaptations for running in soft, dry sand.

The dinosaur trackmaker of the Farlowichnus footprints may have reached lengths of up to 3–3.5 metres (9.8–11.5 ft), as indicated by the larger size of one of the paratype specimens. The holotype trackmaker was smaller, at about 1.5 metres (4.9 ft) long, weighing around 12–15 kilograms (26–33 lb).

== Classification ==
While the type of theropod that produced the Farlowichnus is unknown, Leonardi et al. (2023) speculate that it may have been a relative of noasaurids. It may have had a body morphology comparable to the similarly aged Vespersaurus from Brazil's Rio Paraná Formation. The fossil material of Vespersaurus suggests that it was also monodactylous, a feature observed in the Farlowichnus trackways. However, Navarro et al. (2025) questioned the noasaurid interpretation for the trackmaker of Farlowichnus due to the difference in pedal and ungual anatomy compared to those of Vespersaurus.

== Paleoenvironment ==
Farlowichnus was found in layers of the Botucatu Formation, which dates to the Berriasian–Hauterivian ages of the Early Cretaceous. Fossil remains of several indeterminate animals, including theropod and large ornithopod dinosaurs, mammals, lacertilian reptiles, and invertebrates, have also been described from the formation. The mammalian ichnotaxon Brasilichnium has also been identified from the formation.

== See also ==
- List of dinosaur ichnogenera
- Vespersaurus
