= Botucatu Formation =

Geologic formation in Brazil and Uruguay

- Stratigraphic range: Aptian
- Type: Geological formation
- Unit of: São Bento Group
- Underlies: Serra Geral Formation
- Overlies: Rio do Rasto Formation

Lithology
- Primary: Sandstone

Location
- Coordinates: 29.7°S 52.4°W
- Approximate paleocoordinates: 30.6°S 19.5°W
- Region: Rio Grande do Sul
- Country: Brazil; Uruguay
- Extent: Paraná & Pelotas Basins

Type section
- Named for: Botucatu
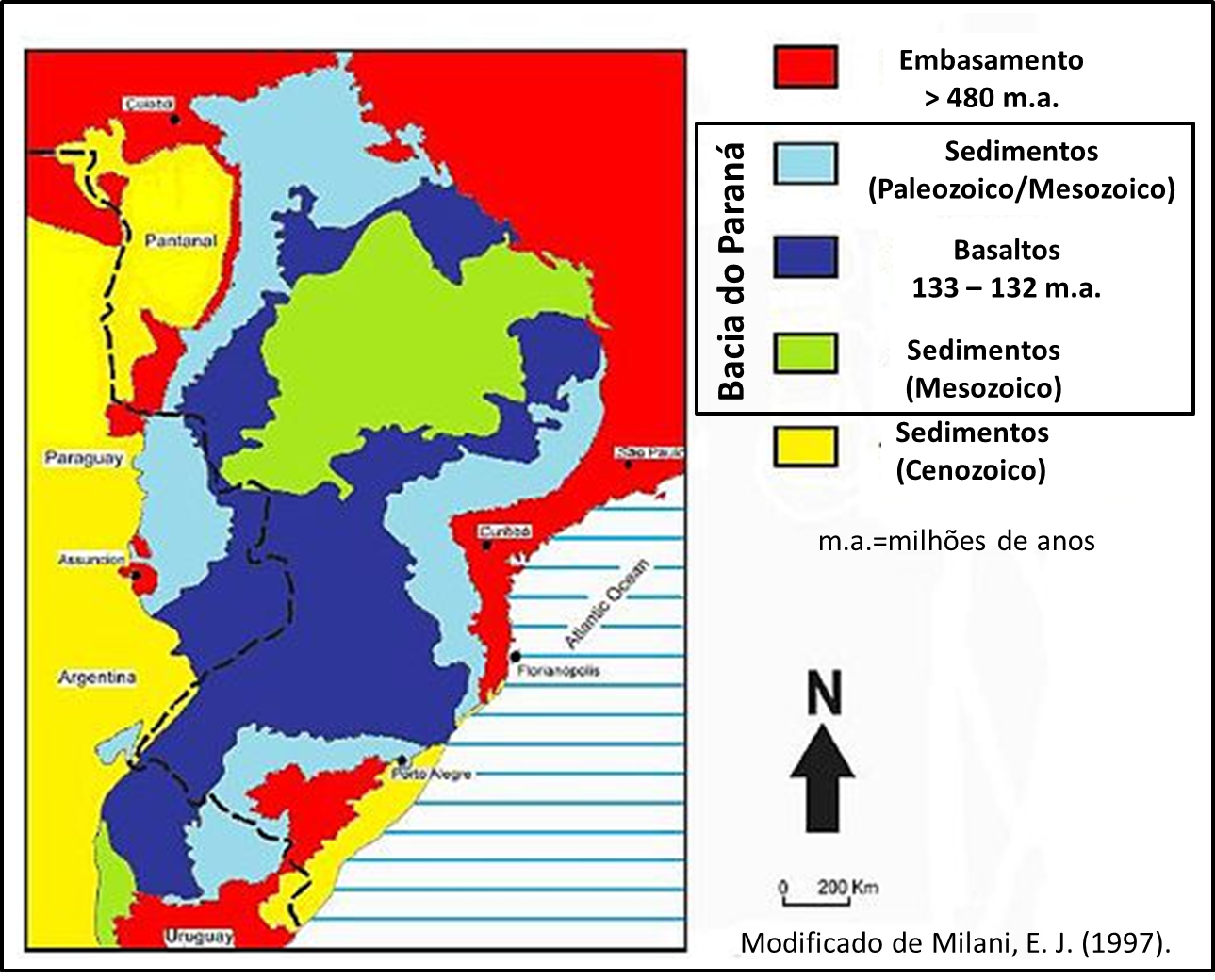
- Geologic map of the Paraná Basin with the Paleozoic and Mesozoic units in light blue

The Botucatu Formation is an Aptian geologic formation of the Paraná and Pelotas Basins in southern Brazil and northern Uruguay. The formation is composed of quartzitic sandstones, deposited in an eolian environment. Fossil theropod tracks have been reported from the formation.

== Description ==
The sandstone is fine-textured and well sorted, containing no pebbles; its colour is occasionally white, yellowish, and reddish, but more commonly it is pinkish. Nearly always it is silicified and therefore compact and hard. The formation was deposited in an arid desert environment, characterized by sabkhas and wadis.

== Fossil content ==
Among the following fossils were reported from the Botucatu Formation:

- Coelurosauria indet.
- Lacertilia indet.
- Mammalia indet.
- Ornithopoda indet.
- Theropoda indet.
- ?Tritylodontoidea indet.

Ichnofossils

- Brasilichnium elusivum
- Farlowichnus rapidus
- Lacertoidea indet.
- Pteraichnus isp.

== See also ==
- List of dinosaur-bearing rock formations
  - List of stratigraphic units with theropod tracks
- List of fossiliferous stratigraphic units in Uruguay
- Itapecuru Formation, contemporaneous fossiliferous formation of the São Luis and Parnaíba Basins
- Bahia Group, contemporaneous fossiliferous formation of the Recôncavo Basin
- Quiricó Formation, contemporaneous fossiliferous formation of the São Francisco Basin
- La Cruz Formation, contemporaneous fossiliferous formation of the Marayes-El Carrizal Basin, Argentina
- Rayoso Formation, contemporaneous fossiliferous formation of the Neuquén Basin, Argentina
- Cerro Barcino Formation, contemporaneous fossiliferous formation of the Cañadón Asfalto Basin, Argentina
- Río Belgrano Formation, contemporaneous fossiliferous formation of the Austral Basin, Argentina
