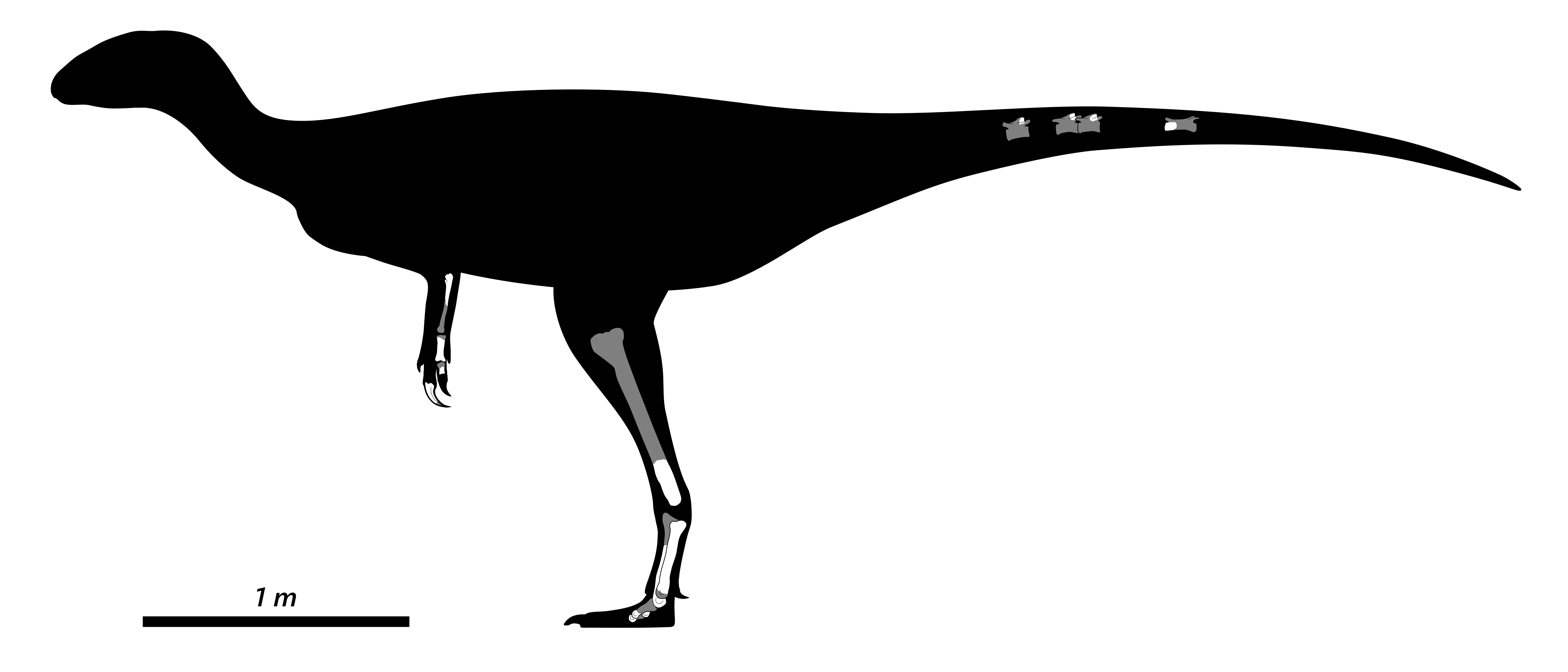
- Skeletal diagram showing known remains

Scientific classification
- Kingdom: Animalia
- Phylum: Chordata
- Class: Reptilia
- Clade: Dinosauria
- Clade: Saurischia
- Clade: Theropoda
- Clade: Averostra
- Genus: †Austrocheirus; Ezcurra et al., 2010
- Species: †A. isasii

Binomial name
- †Austrocheirus isasii Ezcurra et al., 2010

= Austrocheirus =

Austrocheirus Temporal range: Late Cretaceous, 76–70 Ma

Genus of reptiles (fossil)

Austrocheirus is an extinct genus of theropod dinosaur that lived during the Late Cretaceous period. It was named and described by Martin Ezcurra, Federico Agnolin and Fernando Novas in 2010. It contains the type species Austrocheirus isasii. The generic name means "southern hand". The specific epithet honours discoverer and preparator Marcelo Pablo Isasi.

The fossils were found on 17 March 2002 in the Pari Aike Formation, dating from the Campanian to Maastrichtian. These fossils consist of a partial manus (hand), a tibia, axial bones, and a foot bone.

Austrocheirus was a medium-sized theropod measuring 5.5–6.5 metres (18–21 ft) long.

== Classification ==
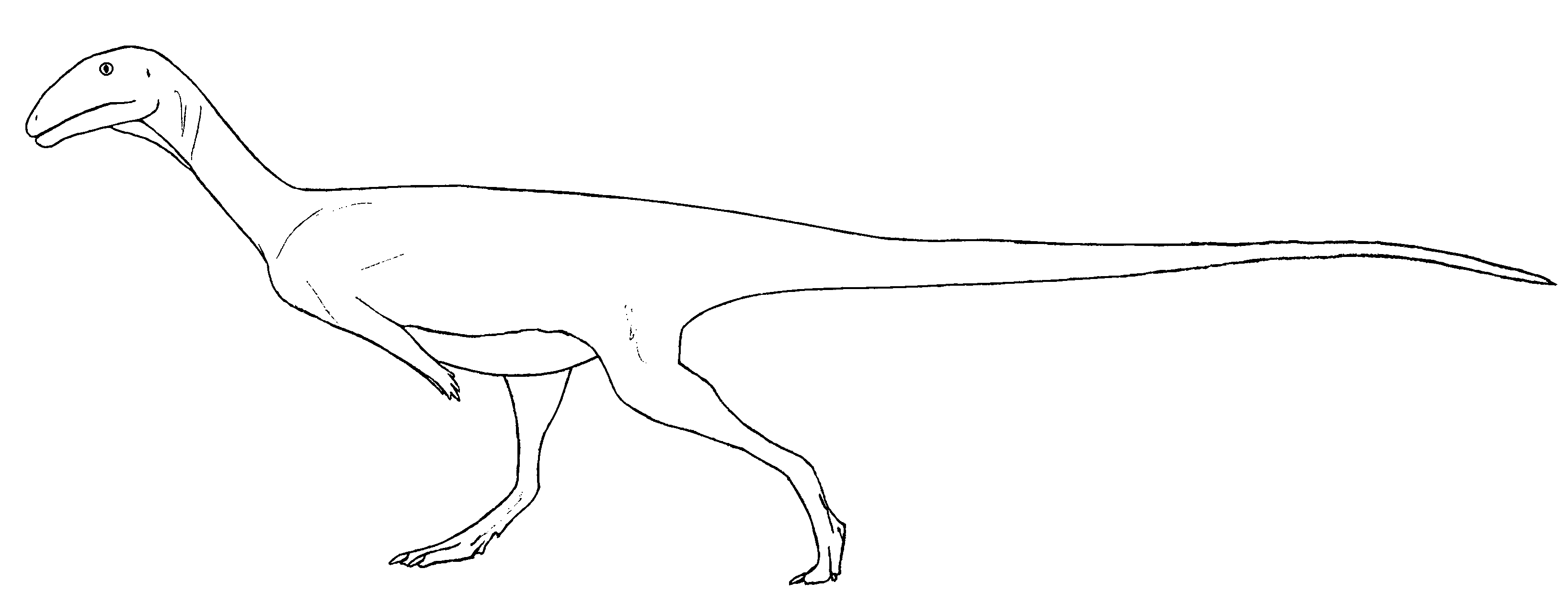
Speculative life restoration as an abelisauroid

A cladistic analysis indicated Austrocheirus had a basal position in the Abelisauroidea, but was more derived than Ceratosaurus and Berberosaurus. This would make it the first known mid-sized abelisauroid which did not possess the reduced forelimbs seen in other members of that clade.

The referral of Austrocheirus to Abelisauroidea was challenged by Oliver Rauhut (2012), who claimed that the putative abelisauroid synapomorphies used to justify this referral are actually also present in the skeletons of non-abelisauroid theropods. Thus, according to Rauhut, Austrocheirus can be only classified as a theropod dinosaur of uncertain phylogenetic placement. A partial ulna, manual claw and metatarsal that belongs to the holotype of Austrocheirus further supports Rauhut's argument, with the important morphological differences preventing its classification to a particular clade of theropods; for this reason, the authors suggested that it is best to classify this genus under incertae sedis Averostra, before more materials are discovered.

In their 2024 redescription of the abelisauroid Noasaurus, Hendrickx et al. noted the disputed affinities of Austrocheirus. Still, they recovered it in a clade also including Berthasaura and Afromimus in their phylogenetic analysis, which they named Berthasauridae. They found berthasaurids to nest outside of the Noasauridae, as the sister taxon to abelisauroids. Their results are displayed in the cladogram below:

- Ceratosauria
  - Kryptops (postcranium)
  - - Elaphrosaurinae
    - Neoceratosauria
      - Ceratosauridae
      - - Berberosaurus
        - - Eoabelisaurus
          - - Ligabueino
            - - Berthasauridae
                - Berthasaura
                - Afromimus
                - Austrocheirus
              - Abelisauroidea
                - Noasauridae
                - Abelisauridae

== See also ==
- Timeline of ceratosaur research
