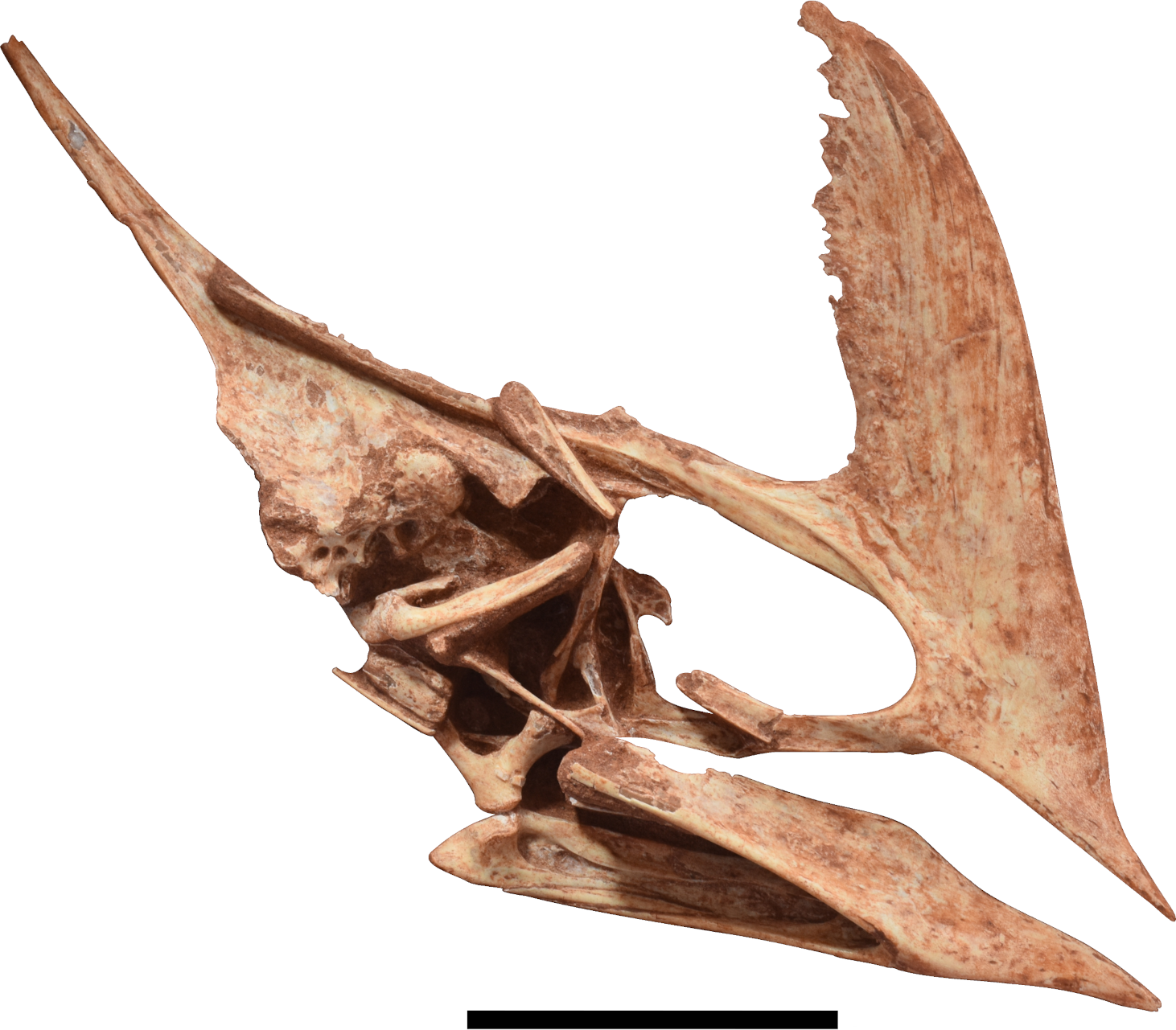
- Holotype skull

Scientific classification
- Kingdom: Animalia
- Phylum: Chordata
- Class: Reptilia
- Order: †Pterosauria
- Suborder: †Pterodactyloidea
- Clade: †Azhdarchoidea
- Family: †Tapejaridae
- Subfamily: †Tapejarinae
- Tribe: †Tapejarini
- Subtribe: †Caiuajarina
- Genus: †Torukjara; Pêgas, 2024
- Species: †T. bandeirae

Binomial name
- †Torukjara bandeirae Pêgas, 2024

= Torukjara =

Torukjara Temporal range: Early Cretaceous, ~Barremian–Albian?

Genus of tapejarid pterosaurs

Torukjara is an extinct genus of tapejarin pterodactyloid pterosaurs from the Early Cretaceous "Pterosaur Graveyard" (Caiuá Group) of Brazil. The genus contains a single species, T. bandeirae, known from several specimens. The Torukjara fossil material was originally assigned to Caiuajara, but several anatomical differences indicate that both similar species coexisted in the ecosystem.

== Discovery and naming ==
The Torukjara fossil material was discovered in the Pterosaur Graveyard locality which likely belongs to the Rio Paraná Formation (Caiuá Group) of Cruzeiro do Oeste, Paraná State, Brazil. The holotype specimen (CP.V 8175), discovered in 2014, consists of a partial skeleton including a well-preserved skull. This specimen was first described in 2022 as belonging to the coeval Caiuajara.

In 2024, Pêgas described Torukjara bandeirae as a new genus and species of tapejarid pterosaurs based on these fossil remains. The generic name, Torukjara, combines a reference to the fictional toruk creature of the Avatar media franchise with the Tupi word "jara", meaning "lord", a suffix often used for tapejarid genera. The specific name, bandeirae, honours Kamila Bandeira, a Brazilian palaeontologist who first studied the possibility that multiple species could be present in the fossil material.

== Classification ==
In their phylogenetic analysis, Pêgas (2024) recovered Torukjara as a tapejarine pterosaur in the family Tapejaridae, as the sister taxon to Caiuajara. The clade containing Torukjara and Caiurajara was named as the new subtribe Caiuajarina. These results are displayed in the cladogram below:

- Tapejaromorpha
  - Thalassodromidae
  - Tapejariformes
    - Caupedactylia
    - Tapejaridae
      - Sinopterinae
      - Tapejarinae
        - Europejara
        - Tapejarini
          - Tupandactylus spp.
          - - Tapejara
            - Caiuajarina
              - Caiuajara
              - Torukjara
