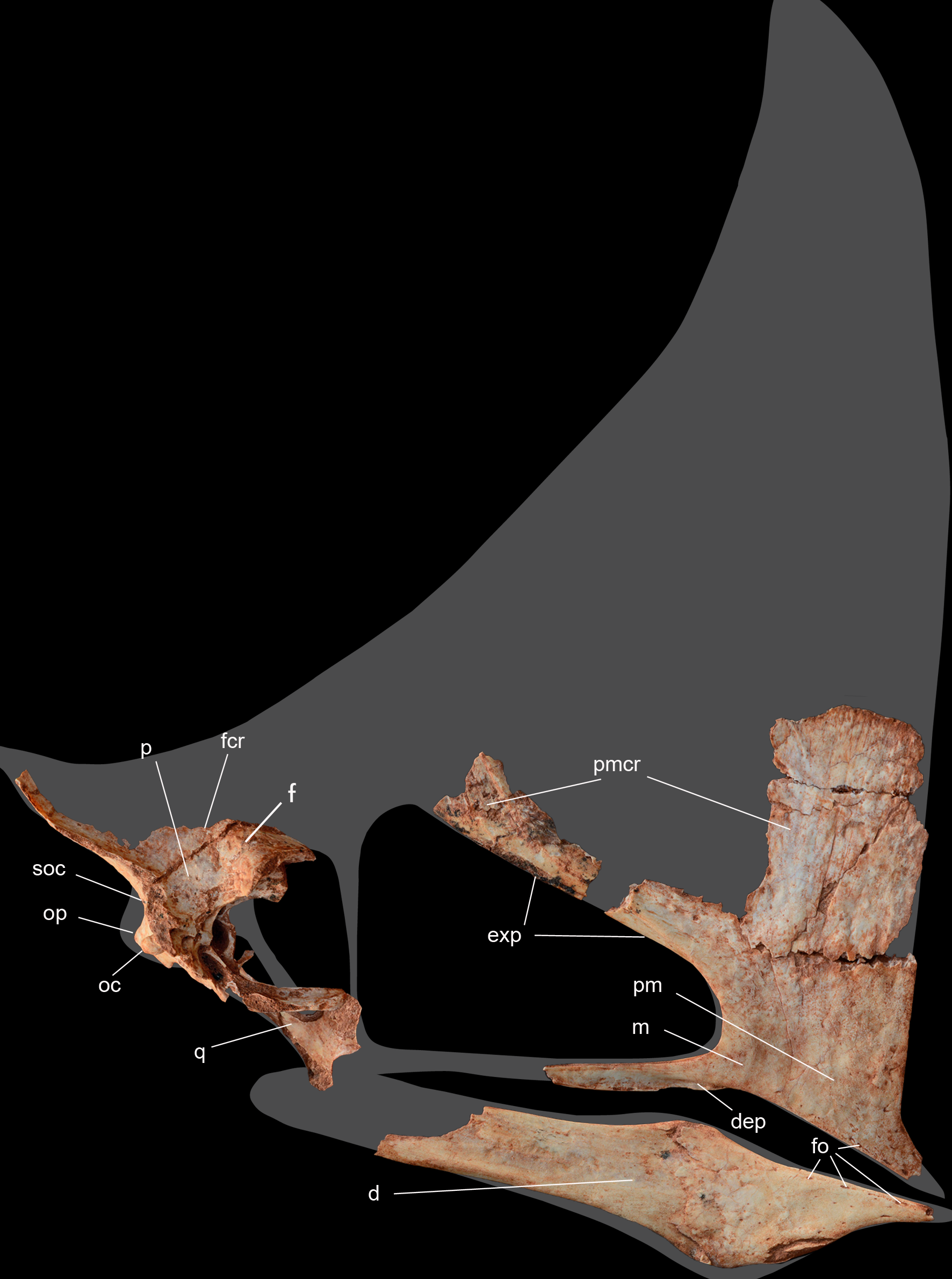
- Holotype skull

Scientific classification
- Kingdom: Animalia
- Phylum: Chordata
- Class: Reptilia
- Order: †Pterosauria
- Suborder: †Pterodactyloidea
- Clade: †Azhdarchoidea
- Family: †Tapejaridae
- Tribe: †Tapejarini
- Subtribe: †Caiuajarina
- Genus: †Caiuajara; Manzig et al., 2014

Type species
- †Caiuajara dobruskii Manzig et al. 2014

= Caiuajara =

Caiuajara Temporal range: Early Cretaceous ~Aptian–Albian

Genus of tapejarid pterosaur

Caiuajara is an extinct genus of tapejarid pterosaur from the Early Cretaceous period (Aptian to Albian stages) of Brazil. It is known from a single type species, Caiuajara dobruskii.

== Discovery and naming ==
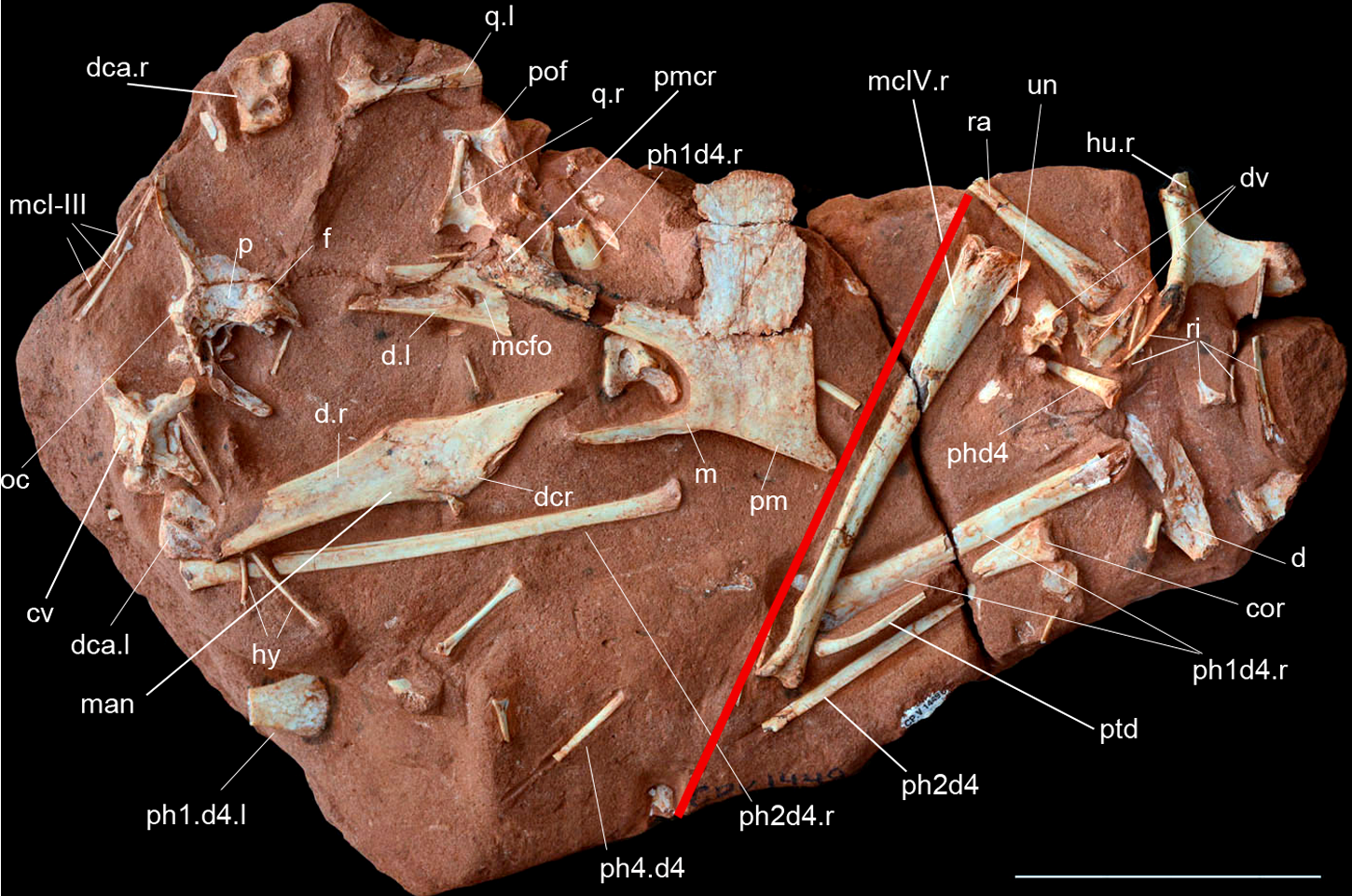
Holotype and paratype specimens

In 1971, the labourers Alexandre Dobruski and his son João Gustavo Dobruski found pterosaur fossils in a field near Cruzeiro do Oeste in the south of Brazil, in the state of Paraná. The finds were in 2011 brought to the attention of paleontologists Paulo C. Manzig and Luiz C. Weinschütz.

In 2014, the type species Caiuajara dobruskii was named and described by Paulo Manzig, Alexander Kellner, Luiz Weinschütz, Carlos Fragoso, Cristina Vega, Gilson Guimarães, Luiz Godoy, Antonio Liccardo, João Ricetti and Camila de Moura. The generic name refers to the geological Caiuá Group and the related genus Tapejara. The specific name honors the discoverers.

The holotype, CP.V 1449, was found in a sandstone layer of the Goio-Erê Formation, of Early Cretaceous age, in the Paraná Basin. It consists of a partial skeleton including the skull, lower jaws, neck vertebrae and wing elements. Many hundreds of bones have been discovered, concentrated in several bone beds, and representing at least forty-seven individuals but probably many more. In the total assembly, all elements of the skeleton are present. The bones have been three-dimensionally preserved, not compressed, but are only rarely articulated. The individuals found are often juveniles; adult animals are much rarer, only represented by two skulls and three humeri. Good specimens have been assigned as paratypes, the more fragmentary ones have been referred.

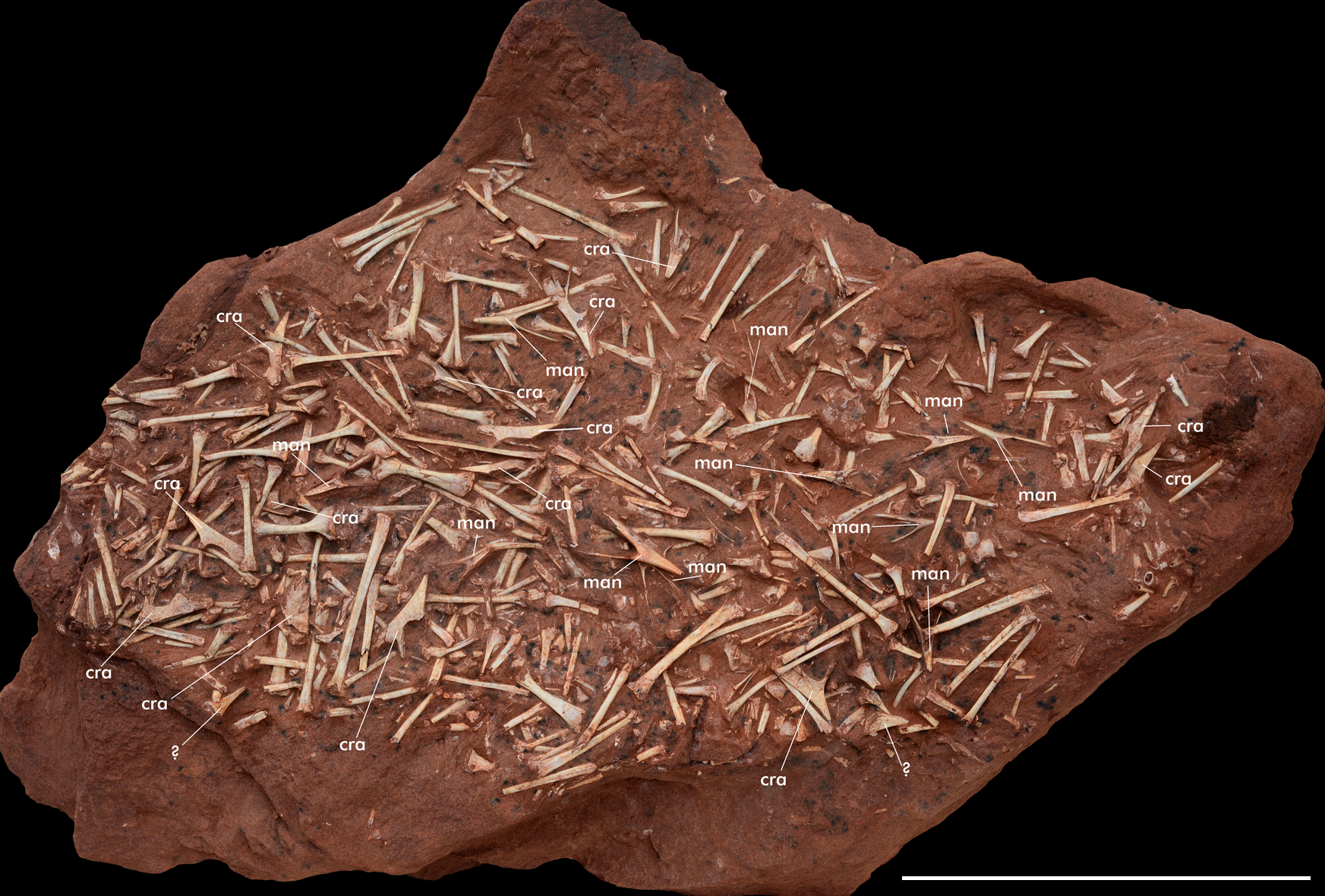
Hundreds of bones, including 14 partial skulls

The paratypes are: CP.V 865: a snout, rear of the mandibula, right jugal, vertebrae, ribs and metatarsals; CP.V 867: a snout and limb bones; CP.V 868: a snout, wing elements and other postcrania; CP.V 869: a vertebral column, right arm, coracoid, breastbone, wing phalanges, belly ribs, pelvic elements and a right thighbone; CP.V 870: a shoulder girdle with the humeri; CP.V 871: a right shoulder girdle with right arm elements; CP.V 872: s partial skeleton including the skull, lower jaws, right arm, neck vertebrae and additional limb elements; CP.V 873: a snout and finger phalanges; CP.V 999: a partial skull; CP.V 1001: a slab with a partial skull, lower jaws and postcrania of at least three individuals; CP.V 1003: a partial skull and symphysis; CP.V 1004: a snout; CP.V 1005: a partial crested skull with the complete mandibula; CP.V 1006: a partial crested skull lacking the snout combined with postcrania; CP.V 1023: a snout and postcrania; CP.V 1024: a skull and postcrania of at least three juveniles; CP.V 1025: a thighbone; CP.V 1026: a thighbone; CP.V 1450: a slab containing at least fourteen juveniles; CP.V 2003: a skull with lower jaws and articulated wing elements; UEPG/DEGEO/MP-4151: a slab with two skulls and postcrania; and UEPG/DEGEO/MP-4152: a snout with postcrania.

Most specimens are part of the collection of the Centro Paleontológico of the Universidade do Contestado. The holotype of the coeval and closely related Torukjara was originally described as a specimen of Caiuajara.

== Description ==
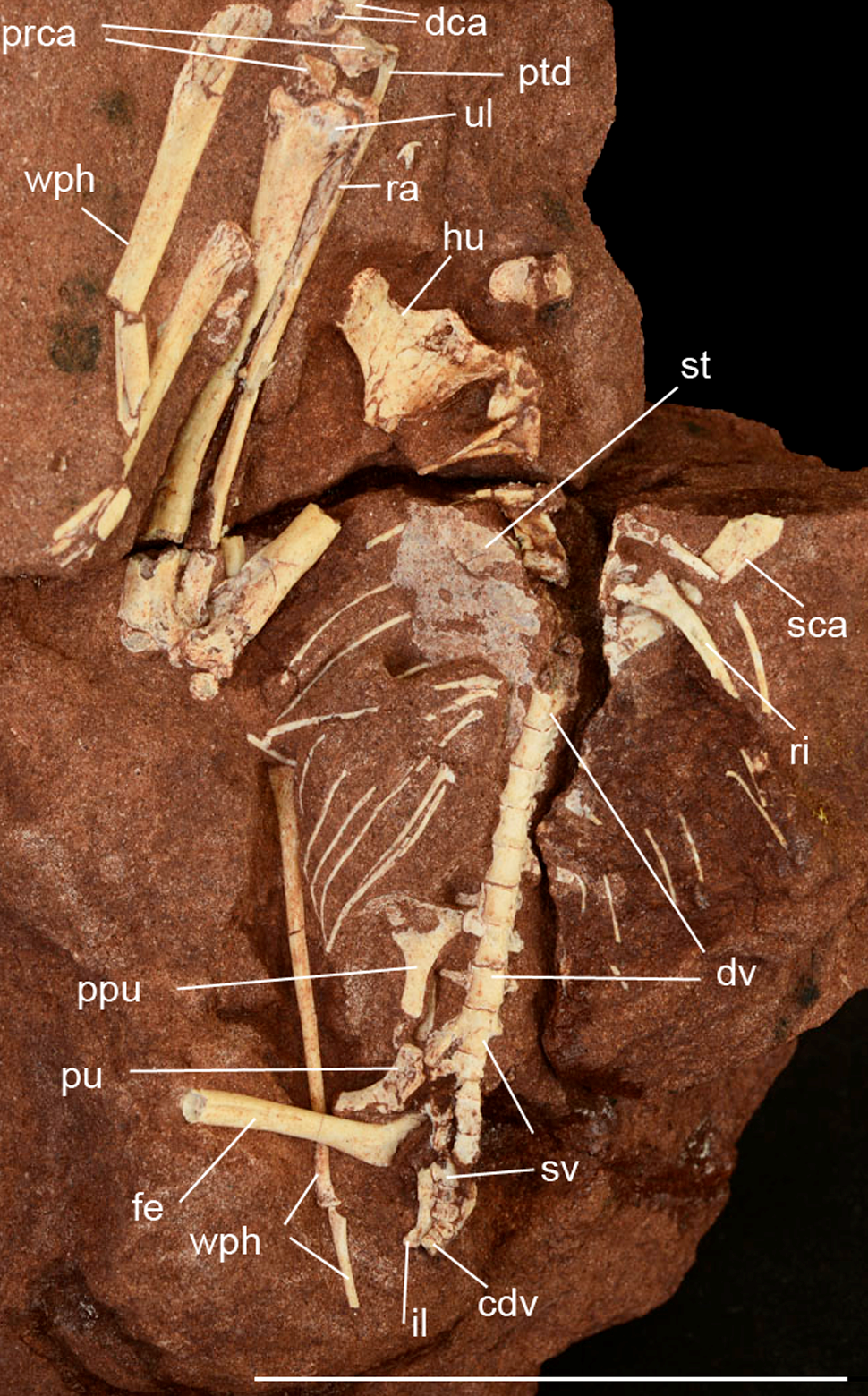
Partial articulated skeleton

The largest individuals of Caiuajara had an estimated wingspan of 2.35 meters (7.7 ft). The species had a large toothless head with, in adult individuals, an enormous shark fin-shaped crest on the snout.

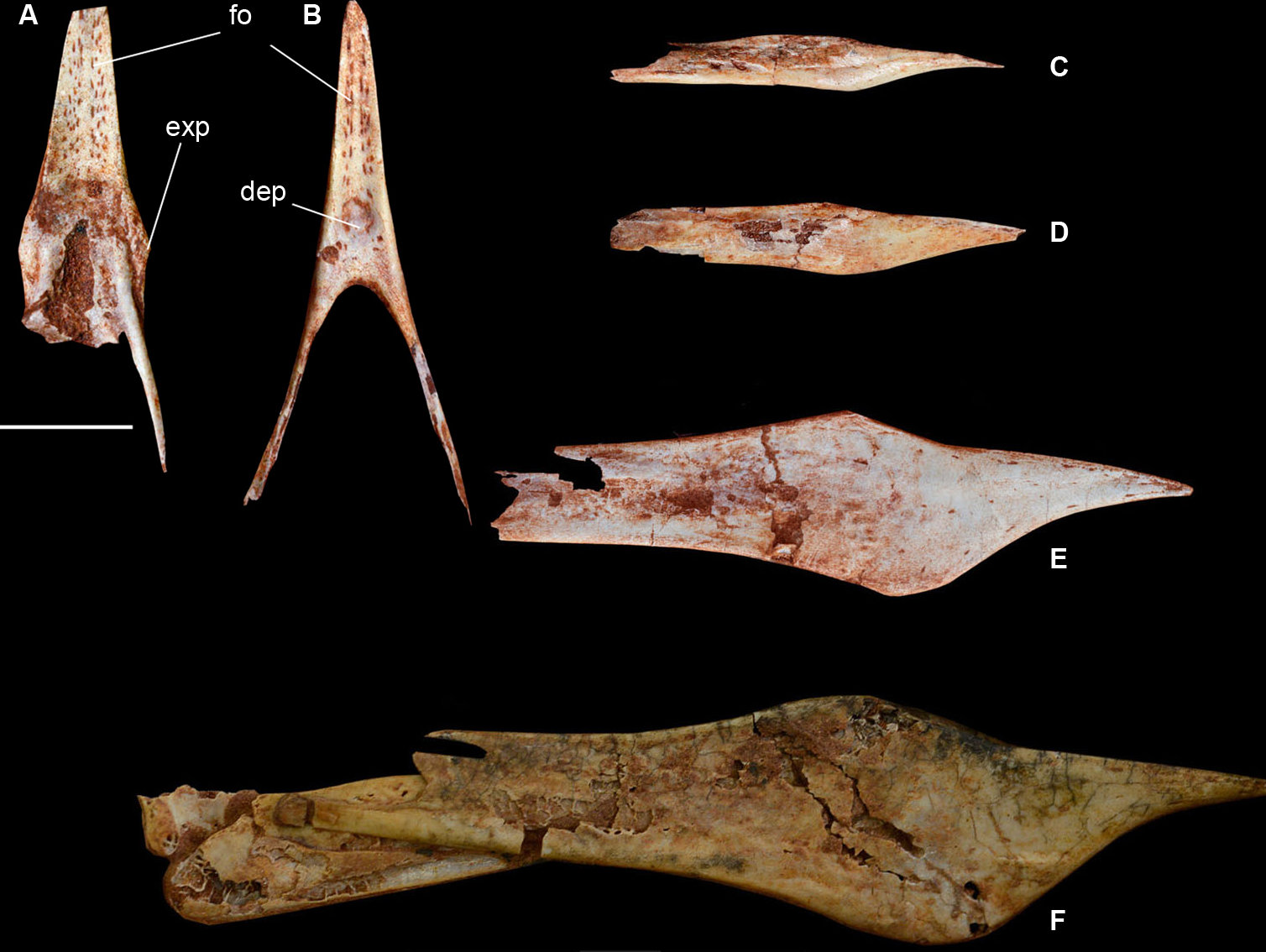
Mandibles

The describing authors established several distinguishing unique traits, autapomorphies. The tip of the snout is strongly oriented to below, at 142 to 149°, relative to the edge of the upper jaw. The rear ascending branches of the premaxillae on their midline form an elongated bony rim projecting to below into the nasoantorbital fenestra, the large skull opening in the side of the snout. In the concave upper rear of the symphysis, the fronts of the lower jaws grown together, a rounded depression is present. The front outer edge of the quadrate shows a longitudinal groove. Below the front part of the nasoantorbital fenestra, a depression is present in the upper jaw edge.

Additionally, Caiuajara shows a unique combination of traits that are themselves not unique. The lower edge of the eye socket is rounded. At a maximal occlusion, the gap between the upper and lower jaw is wider than with other tapejarines. The pteroid on its bottom surface shows a conspicuous depression lacking a pneumatic opening.

== Phylogeny ==
Caiuajara was assigned to the Tapejaridae, more precisely the Tapejarinae. It shares several traits with the tapejarids, such as a crest running from the front snout to the back of the head; an elongated nasoantorbital fenestra occupying over 40% of total skull length; and a large boss on the front edge of the coracoid. A typical tapejarine trait is the down-turned snout tip. A cladistic analysis showed that Caiuajara is a possible sister species of Tupandactylus. In 2014, Caiuajara was the geologically youngest known tapejarid (aside from the possible tapejarid Bakonydraco galaczi) and also the most southern one known. This expansion of their known range was seen as an indication that tapejarids had a global distribution. Moreover, Caiuajara is the first pterosaur found in the south of Brazil. A phylogenetic analysis conducted in 2019 by Kellner (one of the describers of Caiuajara) and colleagues recovered Caiuajara within the tribe Tapejarini, sister taxon to sister taxon to three other genera: Europejara, Tapejara, and Tupandactylus.

- Azhdarchoidea
  - - Azhdarchidae
    - Chaoyangopteridae
  - Tapejaromorpha
    - Keresdrakon vilsoni
    - Tapejaridae
      - Thalassodrominae
        - Thalassodromeus sethi
        - Tupuxuara leonardii
      - Tapejarinae
        - Caupedactylus ybaka
        - - Aymberedactylus cearensis
          - - - Eopteranodon lii
              - "Huaxiapterus" benxiensis
              - "Huaxiapterus" corollatus
              - Sinopterus dongi
            - Tapejarini
              - Europejara olcadesorum
              - Caiuajara dobruskii
              - Tapejara wellnhoferi
              - Tupandactylus imperator

== Paleobiology ==
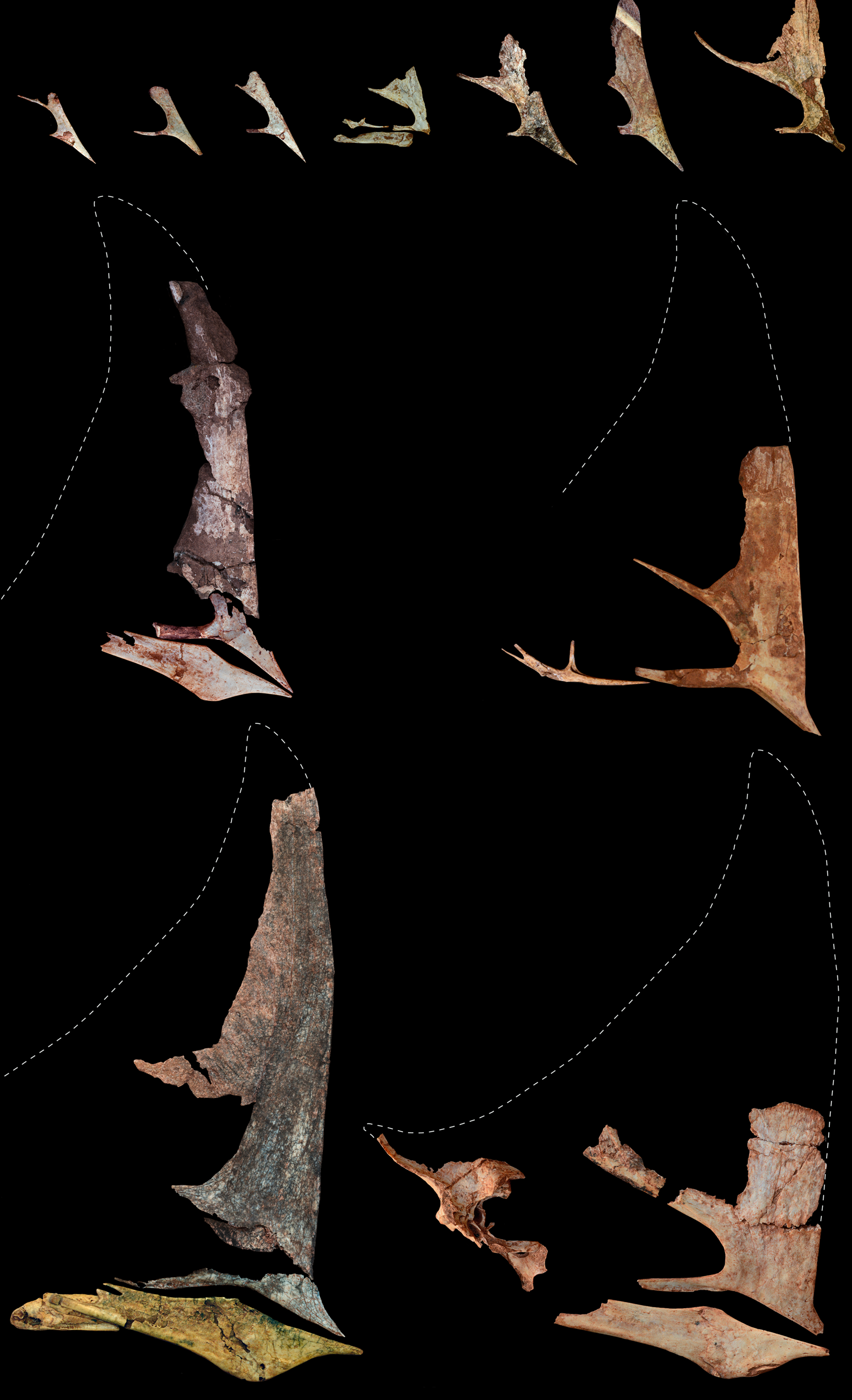
Skulls of different growth stages

The habitat of Caiuajara was a desert with dunes. The layers in which the fossils were found had been deposited in a lake in the desert; probably the bones had been exposed at the surface around the lake for a time and were then by storms blown into it, eventually sinking to the bottom. Possibly the same storms caused many individuals to die together; this could also have been the result of droughts. A succession of layers shows that the lake was likely inhabited by the pterosaurs for a great length of time, although it is also possible they visited the lake during regular migrations. Fossil plants — tapejarids are often assumed to have been herbivores — have not been found, so there are no direct indications about the food source. Likewise, remains of invertebrates have not been discovered.

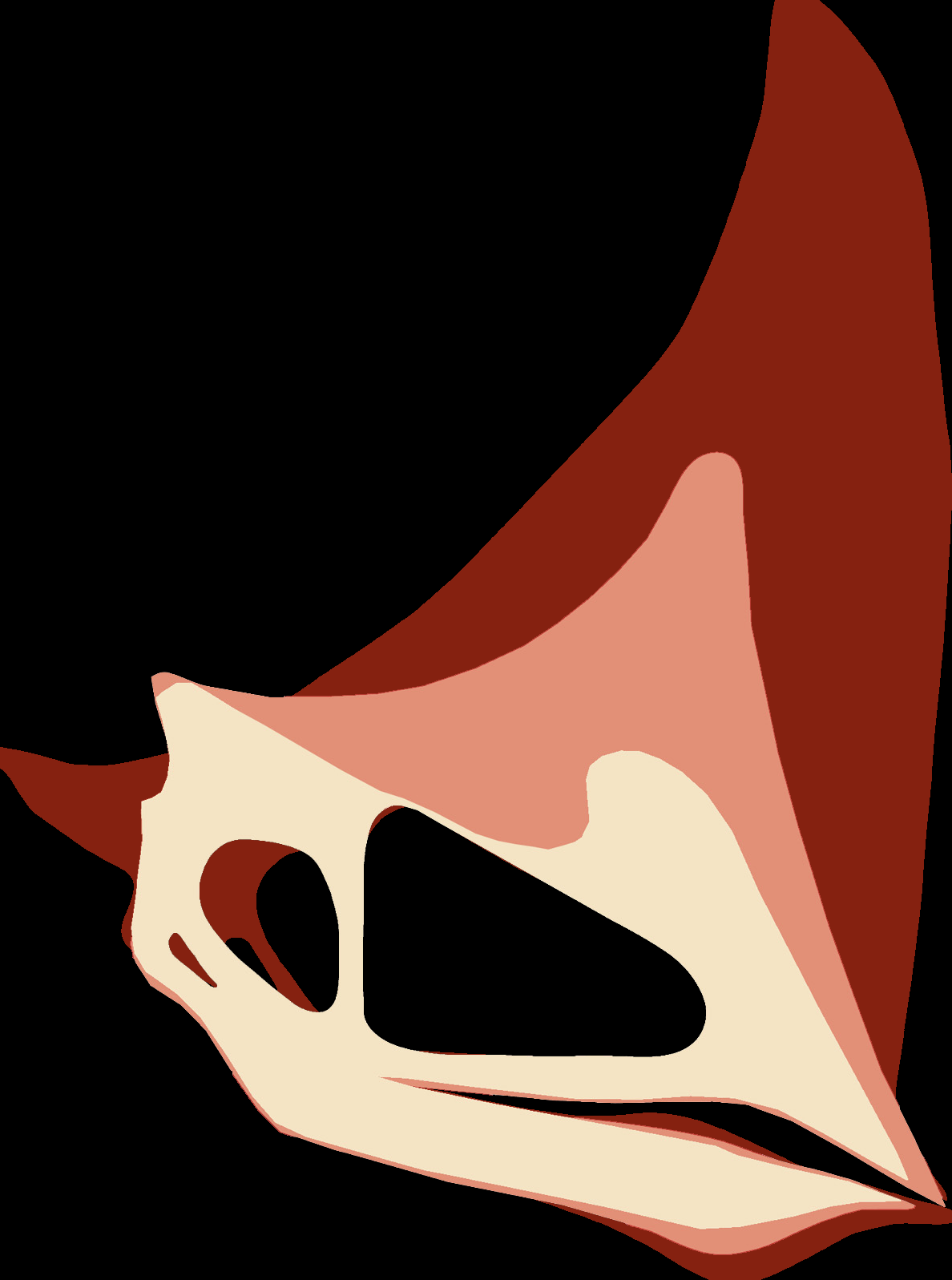
Reconstruction of skull shapes from juveniles (bright color) to adults (darker color)

The large concentrations of fossils, which are rare among pterosaurs and only equaled by those found of the Argentine form Pterodaustro, were interpreted as evidence of a gregarious lifestyle, with Caiuajara living in colonies. The majority of Caiuajara specimens are juveniles, and it is possible that this reflects creching behavior, where young individuals formed large groups separately from most of the adult individuals. The accumulation of juvenile and subadult Caiuajara individuals may represent a nursery near an inland lake.

The age of Caiuajara exemplars can be determined, not just from size but also by the degree of ossification, especially of the breastbone, the long bones and the wrist, and the fusion of the shoulder blade and coracoid into a scapulocoracoid. This allowed the determination of a growth series from young juveniles to skeletally mature adults. It showed that juvenile individuals, the smallest specimens of which have a wingspan of about 65 centimeters (26 in), generally had the same proportions as adults. Especially important is that their humeri are not proportionally smaller and their humeral deltopectoral crests, the attachments of the main flight muscles, are not less developed, attaining a size of 38 to 40% of the humeral shaft length. This suggests that they were precocial, taking wing almost as soon as they hatched; parental care must have been limited. This might have been typical of all derived pterosaurs. The snout crest however, strongly changed during growth. It became much taller and also much more steeply inclined, from about 115° to 90°. Although the snout as a whole also became more massive, the snout tip inclination relative to the jaw edge remained the same. At the back of the skull an additional projection developed. Furthermore, the dentary crest on the lower jaw strongly increased in size. No specimens have been found lacking the snout crest, indicating that Caiuajara was in this respect not sexually dimorphic and casting doubt on the hypothesis that pterosaurs normally were. Analysis of histological sections of Caiuajara bones demonstrate that it had a rapid growth rate, with higher rates of bone deposition than in Rhamphorhynchus and Pterodaustro. Notably, Caiuajara retains a high metabolism through its life, whereas Rhamphorhynchus and Pterodaustro developed lower metabolisms with age.

== See also ==
- List of pterosaur genera
- Timeline of pterosaur research
