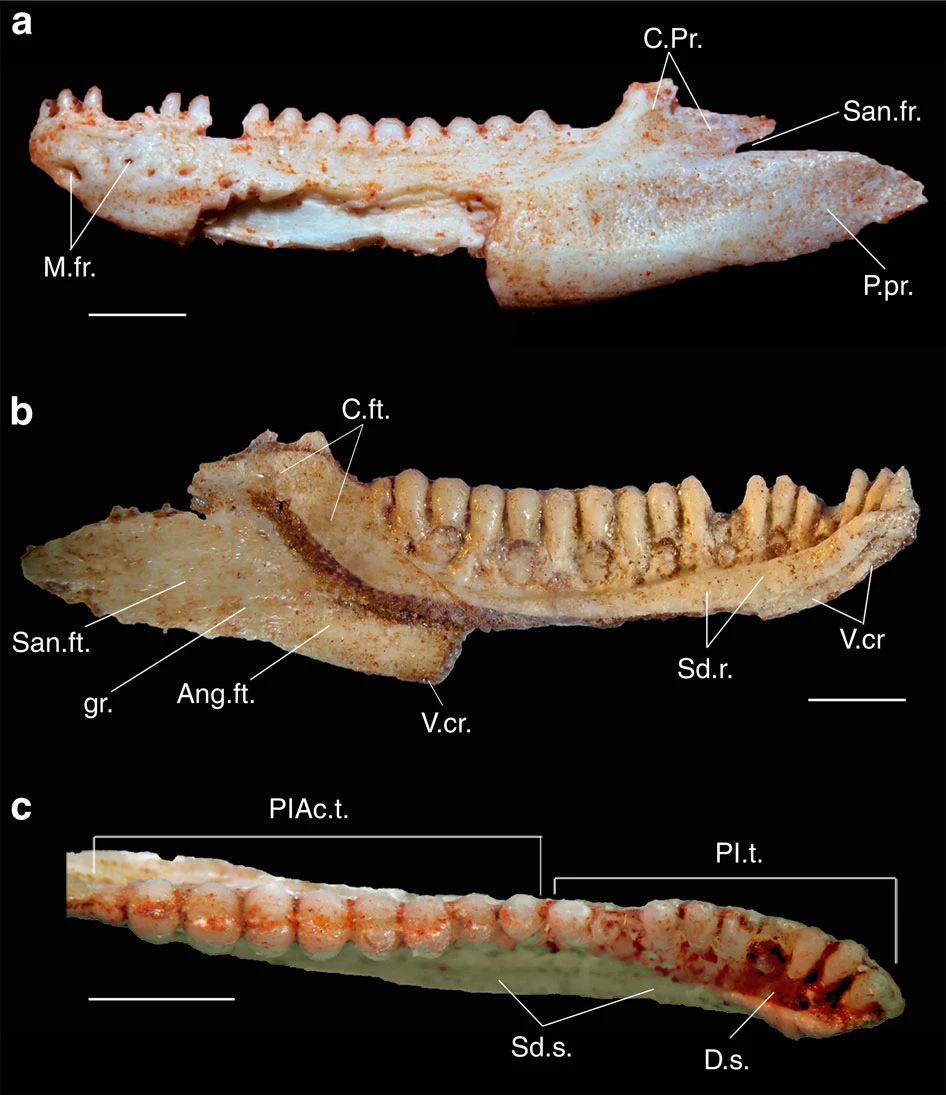
- Holotype

Scientific classification
- Kingdom: Animalia
- Phylum: Chordata
- Order: Squamata
- Suborder: Iguania
- Infraorder: Acrodonta
- Genus: †Gueragama; Simões et al., 2015

Type species
- †Gueragama sulamericana Simões et al., 2015

= Gueragama =

Gueragama Temporal range: Aptian-Albian or Turonian-Campanian 125–100.5 Ma

Extinct genus of lizards

Gueragama is an extinct genus of iguanian lizard from the Cretaceous of Brazil. It belongs to a group of iguanians called Acrodonta, whose living members include chameleons and agamids and are currently restricted to the Old World. Gueragama is the only acrodont known from South America, providing evidence that the group once ranged across much of Gondwana and only became restricted to the Old World after the supercontinent broke apart. The type species, Gueragama sulamericana, was named in 2015 on the basis of an isolated lower jaw from Goio-Erê Formation in the Bauru Basin, which was deposited in a desert environment. Although description shows age of Formation at Turonian to Campanian, later study proposes age around Aptian to Albian instead. Unlike modern acrodontans, whose teeth implant on the margins of the jaws, Gueragama has teeth that implant along the inner surface of the lower jaw, a feature common in most non-acrodontan lizards and characteristic of the second major group of iguanians, Pleurodonta. The non-acrodont dentition of Gueragama is evidence of its basal position within Acrodonta, and is shared with the taxon of Late Cretaceous acrodontan relatives, the family Priscagamidae. In 2022, it is considered that is unlikely to be acrodontan, more likely to be scincoids or teiids instead.
