= Brasilichnium =

Trace fossil classification
- Domain: Eukaryota
- Kingdom: Animalia
- Phylum: Chordata
- Clade: Synapsida
- Ichnofamily: †Chelichnopodidae
- Ichnogenus: †Brasilichnium; Leonardi 1981

Type ichnospecies
- †Brasilichium elusivum (Leonardi, 1983)

Ichnospecies
- †Brasilichnium elusivum Leonardi, 1983

Brasilichnium is the name of fossilised mammaliamorph footprints dating from the Jurassic and Cretaceous. They have been identified from Brazil and western North America.

Brasilichnium is the name of the footprints, identified by their shape, and not of the genus or genera that made them, which is as yet unknown but was likely a mammaliamorph with a semi-erect leg posture. Mammaliamorphs were ancestors of modern mammals.

== See also ==
- List of dinosaur ichnogenera
