= Cruzeiro do Oeste =

Coordinates: 23°46′S 53°04′W

- Municipality
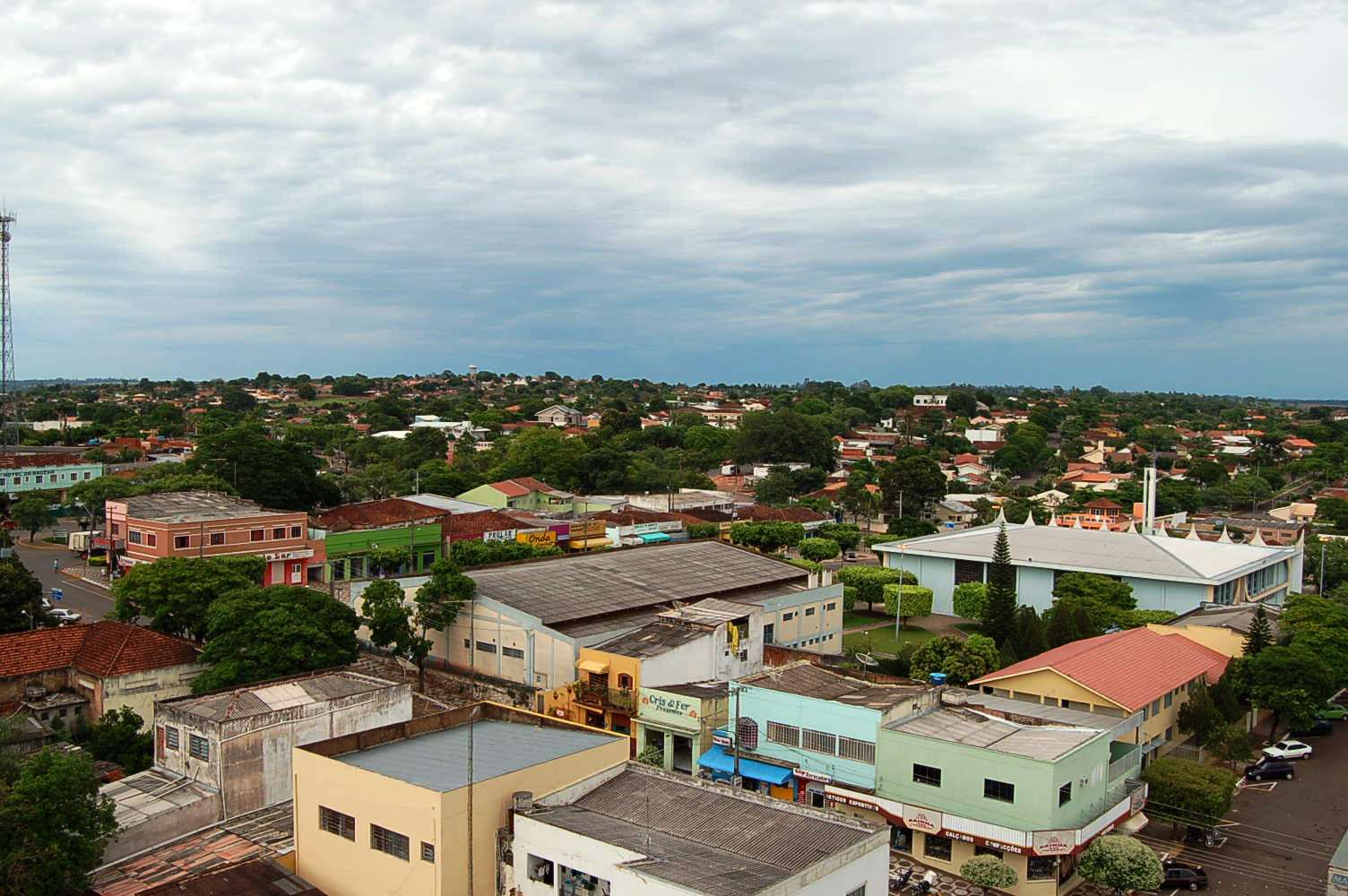
- View of Cruzeiro do Oeste

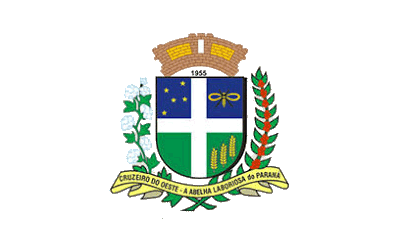
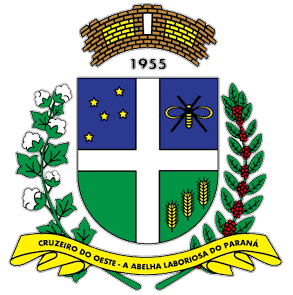
- Flag Coat of arms
- Interactive map of Cruzeiro do Oeste
- Country: Brazil
- Region: Southern
- State: Paraná
- Mesoregion: Noroeste Paranaense

Population (2020)
  - Total: 20,947
- Time zone: UTC−3 (BRT)

Cruzeiro do Oeste is a municipality in the state of Paraná in the Southern Region of Brazil.

== See also ==
- List of municipalities in Paraná
