= Fossil history of flowering plants =

The fossil history of flowering plants records the development of flowers and other distinctive structures of the angiosperms, now the dominant group of plants on land. The history is controversial as flowering plants appear in great diversity in the Cretaceous, with scanty and debatable records before that, creating a puzzle for evolutionary biologists that Charles Darwin named an "abominable mystery". Nonetheless, in April 2024, scientists reported an overview of the origin and development of flowering plants over the years based on extensive genetic studies.

== Paleozoic ==
Fossilised spores suggest that land plants (embryophytes) have existed for at least 475 million years. Early land plants reproduced sexually with flagellated, swimming sperm, like the green algae from which they evolved. An adaptation to terrestrial life was the development of upright sporangia for dispersal by spores to new habitats. This feature is lacking in the descendants of their nearest algal relatives, the Charophycean green algae. A later terrestrial adaptation took place with retention of the delicate, avascular sexual stage, the gametophyte, within the tissues of the vascular sporophyte. This occurred by spore germination within sporangia rather than spore release, as in non-seed plants. A current example of how this might have happened can be seen in the precocious spore germination in Selaginella, the spike-moss. The result for the ancestors of angiosperms and gymnosperms was enclosing the female gamete in a case, the seed. The first seed-bearing plants were gymnosperms, like the ginkgo, and conifers (such as pines and firs). These did not produce flowers. The pollen grains (male gametophytes) of Ginkgo and cycads produce a pair of flagellated, mobile sperm cells that "swim" down the developing pollen tube to the female and her eggs.

Angiosperms appear suddenly and in great diversity in the fossil record in the Early Cretaceous. This poses such a problem for the theory of gradual evolution that Charles Darwin called it an "abominable mystery". Several groups of extinct gymnosperms, in particular seed ferns, have been proposed as the ancestors of flowering plants, but there is no continuous fossil evidence showing how flowers evolved.

Several claims of pre-Cretaceous angiosperm fossils have been made, such as the upper Triassic Sanmiguelia lewisi, but none of these are widely accepted by paleobotanists. Oleanane, a secondary metabolite produced by many flowering plants, has been found in Permian deposits of that age together with fossils of gigantopterids. Gigantopterids are a group of extinct seed plants that share many morphological traits with flowering plants. Molecular evidence suggests that the ancestors of angiosperms diverged from the gymnosperms during the late Devonian, about 365 million years ago.

== Triassic and Jurassic ==
Based on fossil evidence, some have proposed that the ancestors of the angiosperms diverged from an unknown group of gymnosperms in the Triassic period (245–202 million years ago). Fossil angiosperm-like pollen from the Middle Triassic (247.2–242.0 Ma) suggests an older date for their origin, which is further supported by genetic evidence of the ancestors of angiosperms diverging during the Devonian. A close relationship between angiosperms and gnetophytes, proposed on the basis of morphological evidence, has more recently been disputed on the basis of molecular evidence that suggest gnetophytes are instead more closely related to conifers and other gymnosperms.

The evolution of seed plants and later angiosperms appears to be the result of two distinct rounds of whole genome duplication events. These occurred at 319 million years ago and 192 million years ago. Another possible whole genome duplication event at 160 million years ago perhaps created the ancestral line that led to all modern flowering plants. That event was studied by sequencing the genome of an ancient flowering plant, Amborella trichopoda.

Many paleobotanists consider the Caytoniales, a group of "seed ferns" that first appeared during the Triassic and went extinct in the Cretaceous, to be amongst the best candidates for a close relative of angiosperms. The fossil plant species Nanjinganthus dendrostyla from Early Jurassic China seems to share many exclusively angiosperm features, such as flower-like structures and a thickened receptacle with ovules, and thus might represent a crown-group or a stem-group angiosperm. Other researchers contend that the structures are misinterpreted decomposed conifer cones.

== Cretaceous ==
Whereas the earth had previously been dominated by ferns and conifers, angiosperms quickly spread during the Cretaceous. They now comprise about 90% of all plant species including most food crops. It has been proposed that the swift rise of angiosperms to dominance was facilitated by a reduction in their genome size. During the early Cretaceous period, only angiosperms underwent rapid genome downsizing, while genome sizes of ferns and gymnosperms remained unchanged. Smaller genomes—and smaller nuclei—allow for faster rates of cell division and smaller cells. Thus, species with smaller genomes can pack more, smaller cells—in particular veins and stomata—into a given leaf volume. Genome downsizing therefore facilitated higher rates of leaf gas exchange (transpiration and photosynthesis) and faster rates of growth. This would have countered some of the negative physiological effects of genome duplications, facilitated increased uptake of carbon dioxide despite concurrent declines in atmospheric CO_{2} concentrations, and allowed the flowering plants to outcompete other land plants.

The oldest known fossils definitively attributable to angiosperms are reticulated monosulcate pollen from the late Valanginian (Early or Lower Cretaceous - 140 to 133 million years ago) of Italy and Palestine, likely representing basal angiosperms.

The earliest known macrofossil confidently identified as an angiosperm, Archaefructus liaoningensis, is dated to about 125 million years BP (the Cretaceous period), whereas pollen considered to be of angiosperm origin takes the fossil record back to about 130 million years BP, with Montsechia representing the earliest flower at that time.

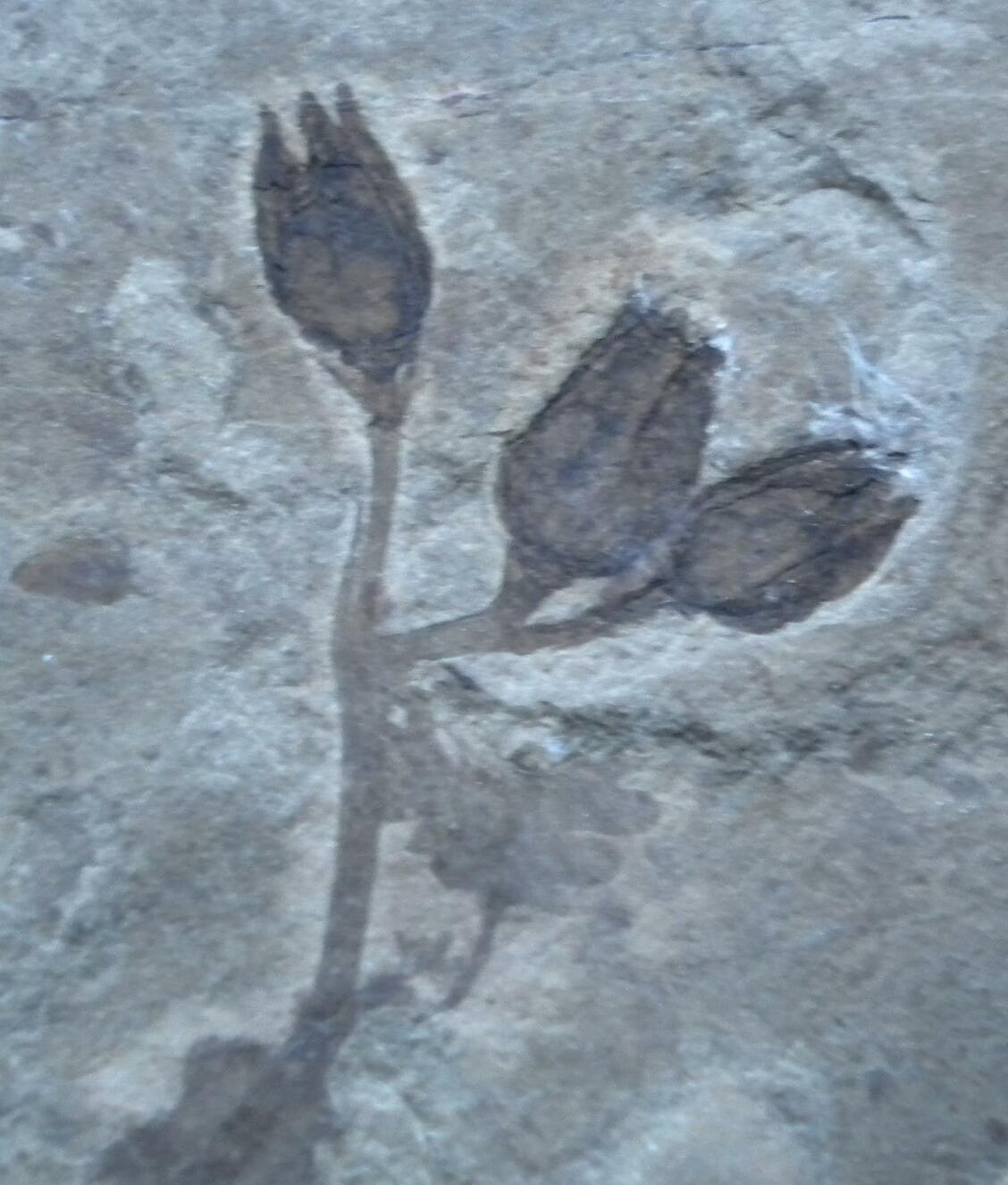
Adaptive radiation in the Cretaceous created many flowering plants, such as Sagaria in the Ranunculaceae.

In 2013 flowers encased in amber were found and dated 100 million years before present. The amber had frozen the act of sexual reproduction in the process of taking place. Microscopic images showed tubes growing out of pollen and penetrating the flower's stigma. The pollen was sticky, suggesting it was carried by insects. In August 2017, scientists presented a detailed description and 3D model image of what the first flower possibly looked like, and suggested that it may have lived about 140 million years ago. A Bayesian analysis of 52 angiosperm taxa suggested that the crown group of angiosperms evolved between 178 million years ago and 198 million years ago.

DNA analysis showed that Amborella trichopoda, on the Pacific island of New Caledonia, belongs to a sister group of the other flowering plants, while morphological studies suggest that it has features that may have been characteristic of the earliest flowering plants. The orders Amborellales, Nymphaeales, and Austrobaileyales diverged as separate lineages from the remaining angiosperm clade at a very early stage in flowering plant evolution.

The great angiosperm radiation, when a great diversity of angiosperms appears in the fossil record, occurred in the mid-Cretaceous, approximately 100 million years ago. However, a study in 2007 estimated that the divergence of the five most recent of the eight main groups, namely the genus Ceratophyllum, the family Chloranthaceae, the eudicots, the magnoliids, and the monocots, occurred around 140 million years ago.

Island genetics offers a possible explanation for the sudden, fully developed appearance of flowering plants. It is believed to be a common source of speciation in general, especially when this is associated with radical adaptations that seem to have required transitional forms. Flowering plants may have evolved on an island or island chain, where the plants bearing them were able to develop a specialised relationship with a specific animal such as a wasp. Such a relationship, with a hypothetical wasp carrying pollen from one plant to another much as modern fig wasps do, could cause the requisite specialisation in both the plant and its partners. The wasp example is not incidental; bees, which evolved specifically due to mutualistic plant relationships, are descended from wasps. The paleontologist Robert T. Bakker has proposed that flowering plants might have evolved due to interactions with dinosaurs. He argued that herbivorous dinosaurs provided a selective grazing pressure on plants.

By the late Cretaceous, angiosperms appear to have dominated environments formerly occupied by ferns and cycadophytes. Large canopy-forming trees replaced conifers as the dominant trees close to the end of the Cretaceous, 66 million years ago or even later, at the beginning of the Paleogene. The radiation of herbaceous angiosperms occurred much later. Yet, many fossil plants recognizable as belonging to modern families (including beech, oak, maple, and magnolia) had already appeared by the late Cretaceous. Evidence of derived pollination relationships such as with Beetles has been recorded as early as the late-Albian. Flowering plants appeared in Australia about 126 million years ago. This also pushed the age of ancient Australian vertebrates, in what was then a south polar continent, to 126–110 million years old.
