= Cretaceous Thermal Maximum =

Period of climatic warming that reached its peak approximately 90 million years ago

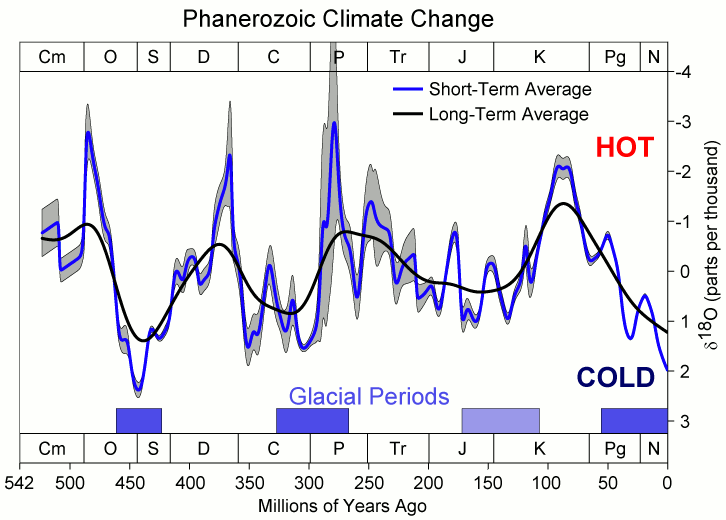
A graph depicting data from the Phanerozoic Geological era, showing oxygen isotopes from present to 500 Ma. The isotope levels show an correlating increase in global temperatures due to glaciation and glacial retreat.

The Cretaceous Thermal Maximum (CTM), also known as Cretaceous Thermal Optimum, was a period of climatic warming that reached its peak approximately 90 million years ago (90 Ma) during the Turonian age of the Late Cretaceous epoch. The CTM is notable for its dramatic increase in global temperatures characterized by high carbon dioxide levels.

== Characteristics ==
During the Cretaceous Thermal Maximum (CTM), atmospheric carbon dioxide levels rose to over 1,000 parts per million (ppm) compared to the pre-industrial average of 280 ppm. Rising carbon dioxide resulted in a significant increase in the greenhouse effect, leading to elevated global temperatures. In the seas, crystalline or "glassy" foraminifera predominated, a key indicator of higher temperatures. The CTM began during the Cenomanian/Turonian transition and was associated with a major disruption in global climate as well as global anoxia during Oceanic Anoxic Event 2 (OAE-2). The CTM was one of the most extreme disruptions of the carbon cycle in the past 100 million years. It represented one of the most prominent peaks in the global temperature record of the Phanerozoic eon.

== Geological causes ==
From 330 to 170 Ma, Pangaea covered the Earth's surface, forming one super continent and one gargantuan ocean. During the breakup of Pangaea from 170 to 150 Ma, the nascent Atlantic Ocean began to form the "Atlantic Gateway". Geological records from both the Deep Sea Drilling Project (DSDP) and the Ocean Drilling Program (ODP) support the enhancement of the CTM by the rifting of the Atlantic Ocean. Rising atmospheric carbon dioxide is thought to have been enhanced by the changing geography of the oceans. While rising carbon dioxide levels caused increased global warming, the climate models of the Cretaceous period do not show such elevated global temperatures due to the Earth's carbon dioxide variations. Geologic records show evidence of dissociation of methane clathrates, which causes a rise in carbon dioxide, as the oxygen gas in the atmosphere will oxidize the released methane.

== Progression with time ==
Measurements of the ratio of stable oxygen isotopes in samples of calcite from foraminifera from sediment cores show gradual warming starting in the Albian period and leading to the interval of peak warmth in the Turonian followed by a gradual cooling of surface temperatures to the end of the Maastrichtian age. During the Turonian, several pronounced but relatively short-lived cooler intervals punctuate the otherwise remarkably stable interval of extreme warmth.

== Impact ==
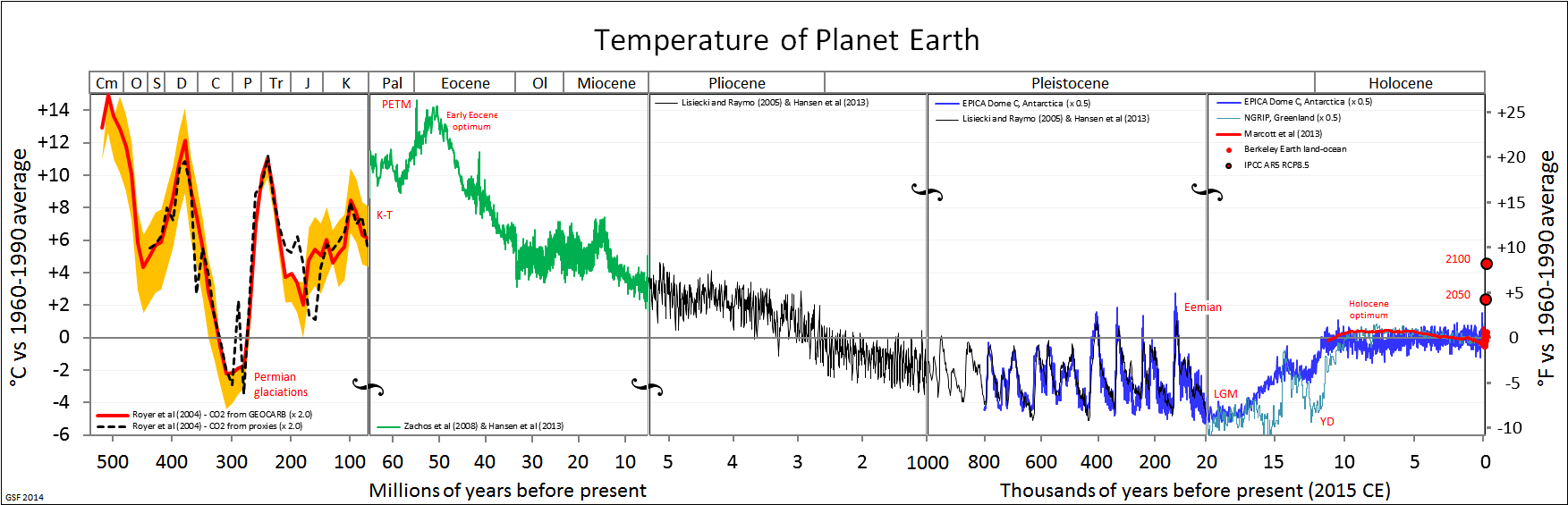
Depiction of average planetary temperature of Earth over the past 500 million years. Note that the scale of 500-100 Ma is halved to fit on the graph, with the Cretaceous Thermal Maximum occurring at the peak just before 100 Ma.

Late Cenomanian sea surface temperatures (SSTs) in the equatorial Atlantic Ocean were substantially warmer than today (~27-29 °C). Turonian equatorial SSTs are conservatively estimated based on δ18O and high pCO_{2} estimates to have been ~32 °C, but may have been as high as 36 °C. TEX_{86}^{L} values suggest minimum and maximum low-latitude SSTs of 33-34 ± 2.5 °C and 37-38 ± 2.5 °C, respectively. Rapid tropical sea surface temperature changes occurred during the CTM. High global temperatures contributed to diversification of terrestrial species during the Cretaceous Terrestrial Revolution and also led to warm stratified oceans during the Oceanic Anoxic Event 2 (OAE-2).

== See also ==
- Cretaceous
- Global warming
- Greenhouse gas
- Paleocene–Eocene Thermal Maximum
- Little Ice Age
- Medieval Warm Period
- Polar forests of the Cretaceous
