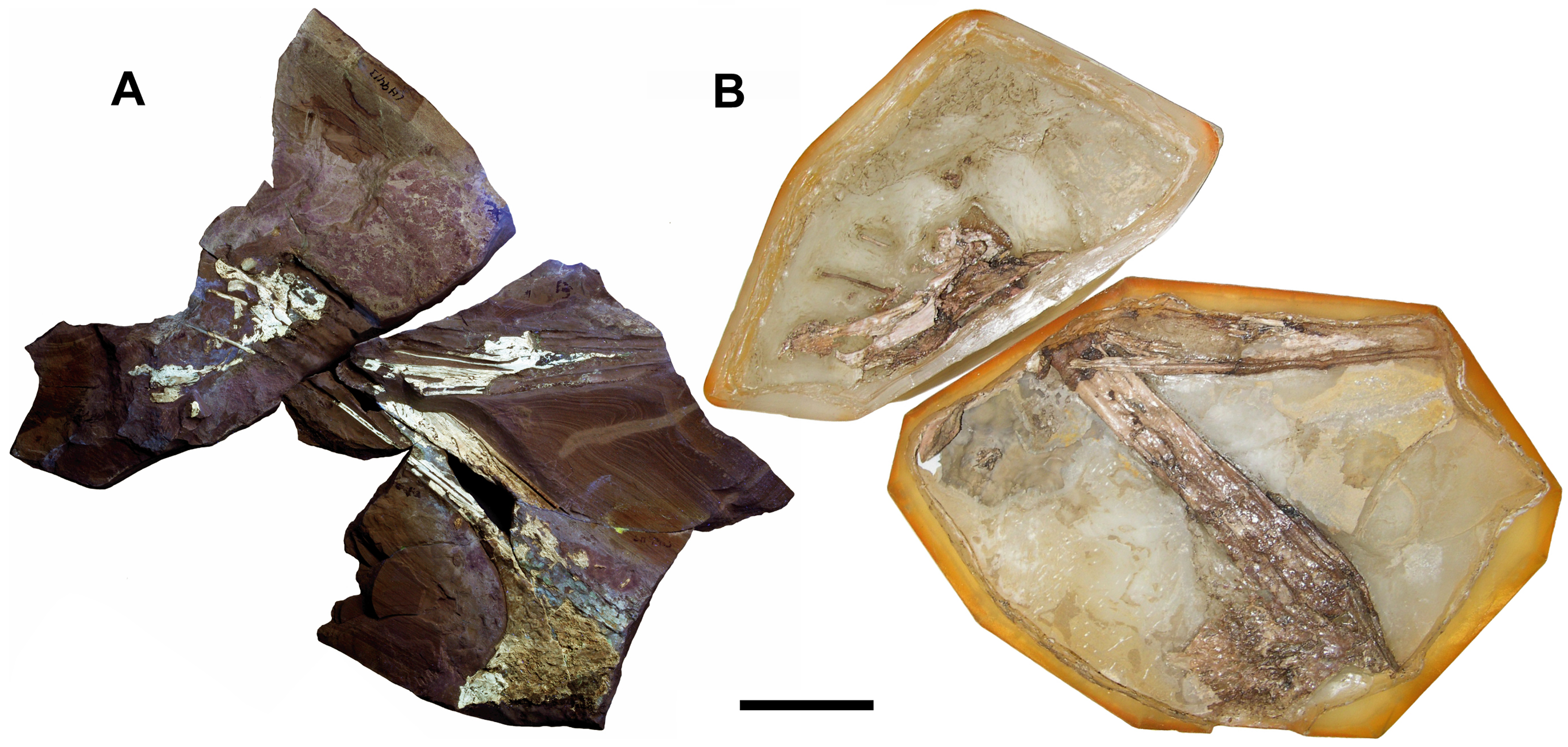
- Slab and counterslab of the holotype skull; A shows the main slab under ultraviolet light, B shows the acid-prepared counterslab.

Scientific classification
- Kingdom: Animalia
- Phylum: Chordata
- Class: Reptilia
- Order: †Pterosauria
- Suborder: †Pterodactyloidea
- Clade: †Azhdarchoidea
- Family: †Tapejaridae
- Subfamily: †Tapejarinae
- Tribe: †Tapejarini
- Genus: †Europejara; Vullo et al., 2012
- Species: †E. olcadesorum

Binomial name
- †Europejara olcadesorum Vullo et al., 2012

= Europejara =

Europejara Temporal range: late Barremian

Genus of tapejarid pterosaur

Europejara is a genus of tapejarid pterosaur, a flying reptile that lived in what is now Spain during the Barremian age of the Early Cretaceous epoch, 125 to 121 million years ago. The only known specimen was found at the Las Hoyas site of Cuenca, a location noted for its exceptional Konservat-Lagerstätte preservation. In 2012, the new genus and species Europejara olcadesorum was named based on it. The generic name refers to Europe, where it was found, and to the related genus Tapejara from Brazil, while the specific name refers to the Olcades, an ancient people that lived in the region. The holotype specimen consists of an incomplete, crushed skull; the bones of the postorbital region are displaced while the mandible is almost complete.

The first tapejarid known from Europe, Europejara was also the oldest known member of that group and the oldest known toothless pterosaur at the time of its naming. A relatively small pterosaur, Europejara is estimated to have had a wingspan of around 2–4 m (6.6–13.1 ft). As a tapejarid, it had a short skull with downturned jaws and would have had two crests on the upper part of its skull connected by a keratinous structure. The genus is mainly distinguished from other tapejarids in that the dentary crest, which projected down from the front of the lower jaws, was recurved backwards, and was more developed from top to bottom than from front to back. A combination of other skull features is also used to distinguish it.

Researchers have found Europejara to be related to Brazilian tapejarids and, given its age, have used this relationship as evidence for the group's origin on the northern palaeocontinent of Laurasia. The function of tapejarid dentary crests is uncertain, but a role in aerodynamics, thermoregulation, or social behavior has been suggested. Due to the shape of their skulls and jaws, they have been considered frugivorous (fruit-eaters) and/or granivorous (seed-eaters), and the age of Europejara led its describers to suggest that tapejarids had a role in seed dispersal when angiosperms (flowering plants) first appeared. Europejara is known from the La Huérguina Formation, which represents a subtropical wetland environment.

== Discovery and naming ==
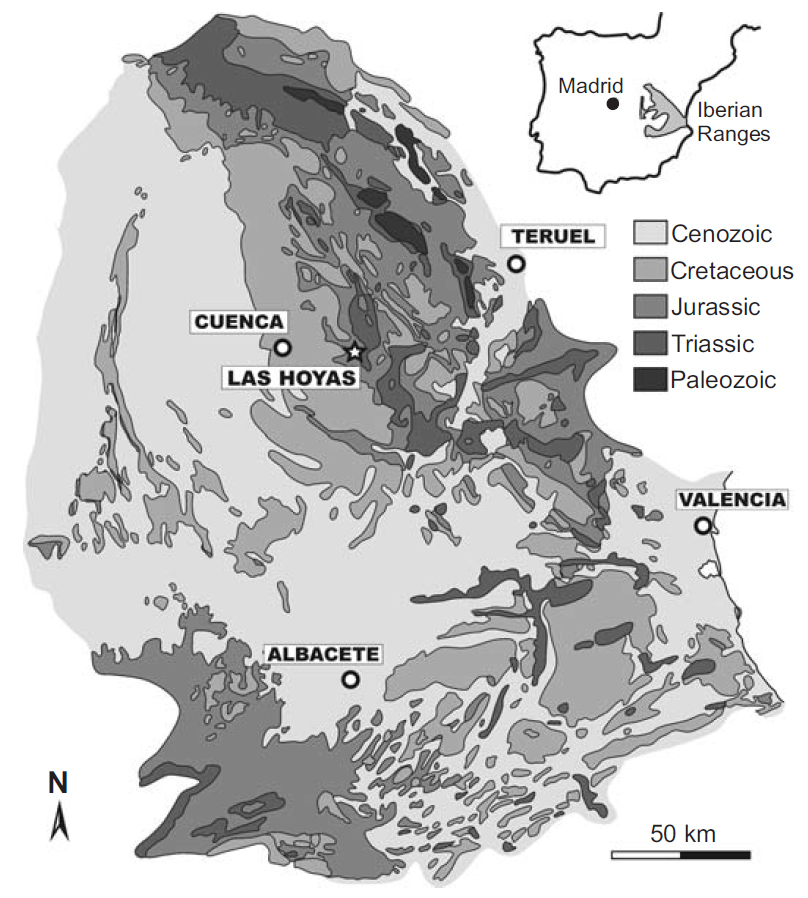
Geological map of eastern Spain showing the Las Hoyas site (star), and Mesozoic strata of the Iberian Ranges

The Castilla–La Mancha region of eastern Spain contains many rich fossil localities spanning from the Precambrian to the Pleistocene; the Las Hoyas site in Cuenca in the southwestern Iberian Ranges has been particularly noted for its Konservat-Lagerstätte preservation (with exceptionally well-preserved fossils). The locality belongs to the La Huérguina Formation and dates to the late Barremian of the Early Cretaceous. The site was discovered in 1985, and as of 2023, nearly 30 excavation campaigns have yielded over 20,000 fossils; these are housed at the Science Museum of Castilla–La Mancha in Cuenca. The preservation and extent of the site's fossil flora and fauna have given it worldwide scientific renown, and it was declared a Site of Cultural Interest by the regional government in 2016.

In 2012, the palaeontologist Romain Vullo and colleagues reported an incomplete skull of a pterosaur (an extinct order of flying reptiles) from Las Hoyas, new to science. This pterosaur is the first member of the family Tapejaridae known from Europe, adding to the poorly known pterosaur fauna of the locality. Previously, tapejarids were only certainly known from Brazil and China, where pterosaur fossils of similar age are more abundant and more complete than in Europe. At the time, the specimen was also the oldest known tapejarid and the oldest known toothless pterosaur. The specimen (designated as MCCM-LH 9413 in the Las Hoyas collection of the Museo de las Ciencias de Castilla–La Mancha) was made the holotype of the new genus and species Europejara olcadesorum. The generic name combines the names of Europe (itself derived from Europa of Greek mythology) where it was found, and the related genus Tapejara, the Brazilian genus that defines the clade Tapejarinae. The name Tapejara itself is composed of the Tupí-Guaraní words tapi or tape, which means 'path', and yara or jara, which means 'lord'. The specific name refers to the Olcades, an ancient Celtiberian people from Hispania that first inhabited the region of Cuenca.

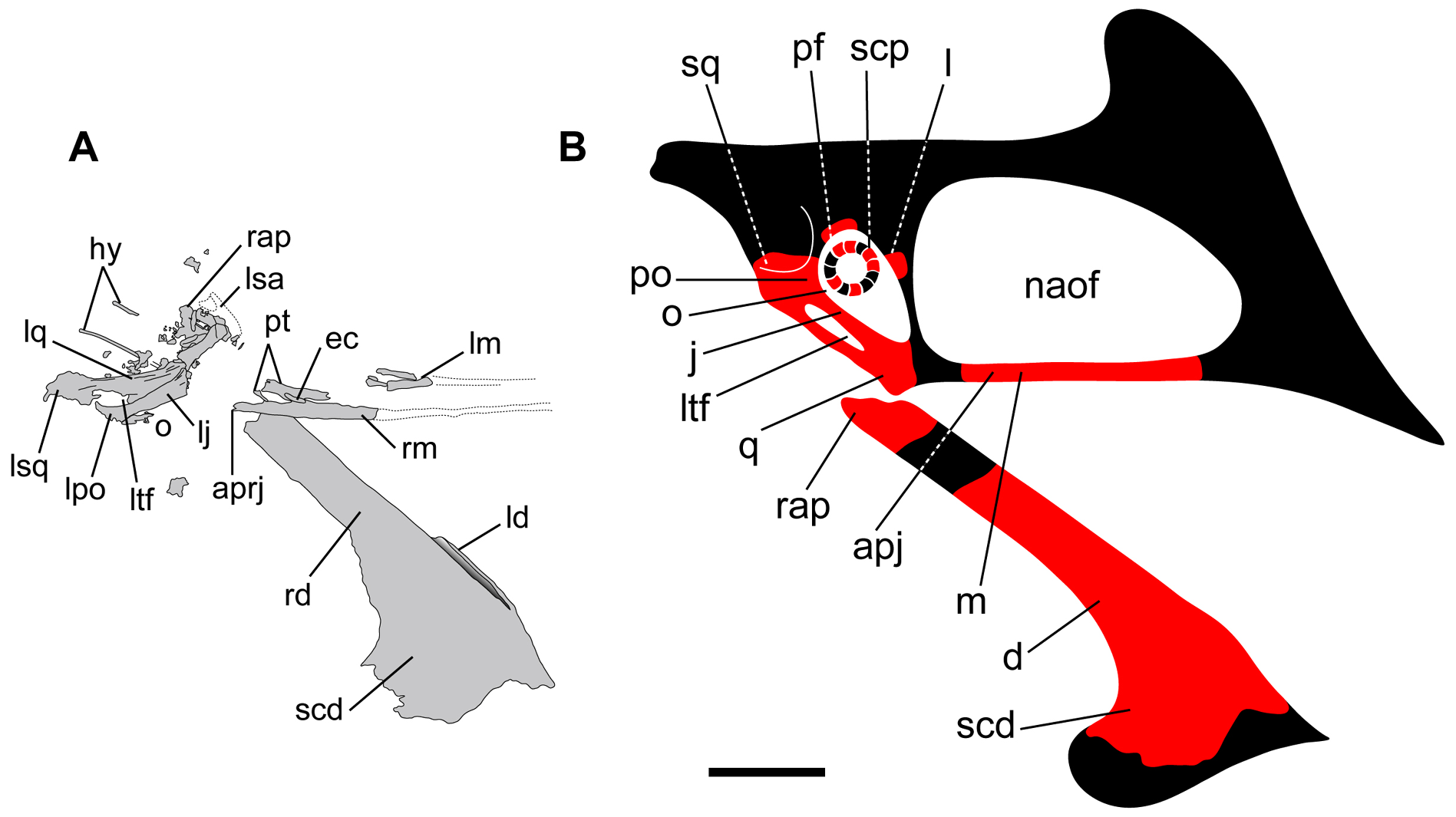
Drawing showing the preserved parts of the holotype skull and reconstruction of the entire skull showing these parts in red; scd is the dentary crest, po is the postorbital bone.

The holotype consists of the hind part of a skull with lower jaws, compressed on a slab and counterslab of limestone. Several scattered plates that formed the scleral ring (a bony ring inside the eye) and two elements of the hyoid (tongue bone) are also present. The skull is crushed and flattened from top to bottom, with bones of the left postorbital region (the area behind the orbit or eye socket) being displaced, but the mandible is almost complete and is preserved in side view. No integument, such as soft tissue and keratinous parts, is preserved. The preparation of the specimen included removing elements from the fossil matrix with acid, and it was photographed under ultraviolet light for its description. The fossil was presented at an outreach event in 2012, which included the best Las Hoyas fossils from the Sciences Museum, where the audience interacted with the researchers, who demonstrated study techniques.

== Description ==
Size compared to a human

Based on the proportions of other tapejarids, the describers of Europejara considered it a relatively small pterosaur in 2012, with an estimated wingspan of around 2 m (6.6 ft). In 2023, some of the same authors gave a wingspan of 3–4 m (9.8–13.1 ft), considering Europejara a mid-sized pterosaur.

Tapejarids are characterised by their short faces and downturned jaw tips. Most mature skulls had two crests on their upper surface—one at the front (on the premaxilla, the frontmost bone of the upper jaw) and one at the back, with keratinous soft-tissue structures occupying the space between the two. The lower jaws of adults had a rounded crest projecting down from the dentary bone at the mandibular symphysis (where the two halves of the mandible connected at the front). Although Europejara is only known from skull bones, relatives show tapejarids had comparatively robust and complex limb girdles, elongated limbs for their body size, but rather short wing fingers and feet, and very short tails. As a pterosaur, Europejara was covered with hair-like pycnofibres and had extensive wing membranes (which were extended by the wing finger).

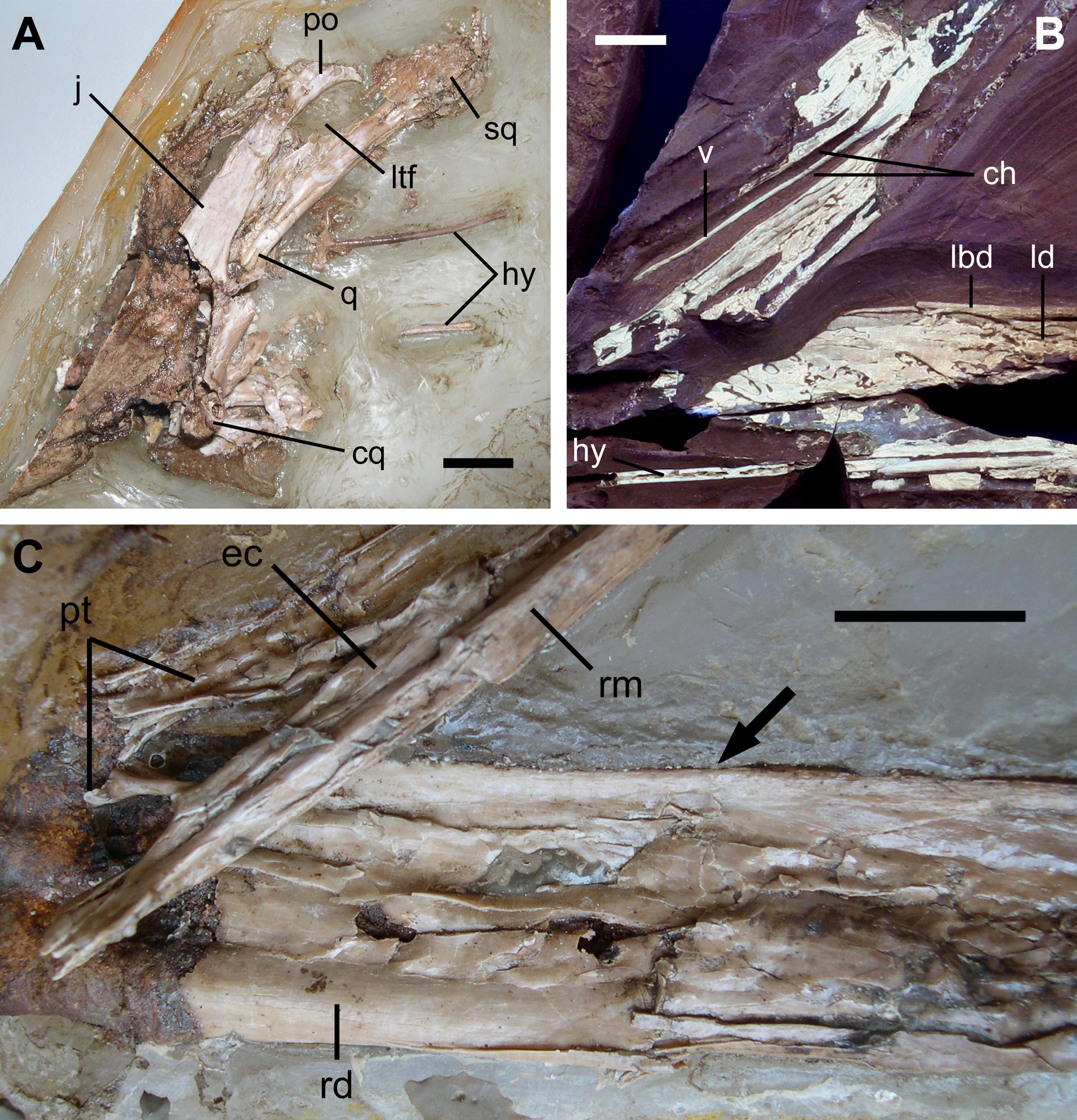
Close-ups of the skull; A is the postorbital region, B the hind area of the palate, and C is a detail of the palate.

Both maxillae (the bones that form most of the upper jaw) of Europejara are preserved, though incompletely, with their upper margins exposed, and form an angle of around 12 degrees. The postorbital bone (the bone behind the orbit) is roughly triangular, with no visible suture (joint) between it and the jugal bone (or cheek bone) underneath. The plates of the scleral ring are trapezoidal in shape and thin. A lacrimal bone (the bone that separates the orbit from the bony nostril) was tentatively identified and is typical for tapejarids, being thin and fenestrated (having openings).

The lower temporal fenestra (the opening behind the orbit) at the back of the skull of Europejara was narrow, as indicated by the position of the quadrate bone (which forms part of the jaw joint). The palate is preserved in top view and has two narrow, elongated choanae (internal nostrils), separated by a thin vomer (part of the middle of the palate). The hyoid apparatus, a structure involved in supporting the tongue and larynx, is preserved in the form of the first pair of ceratobranchial bones. Each is about 135 mm (5.3 in) in length and 2 mm (0.079 in) in diameter, and their hind halves are slightly curved.

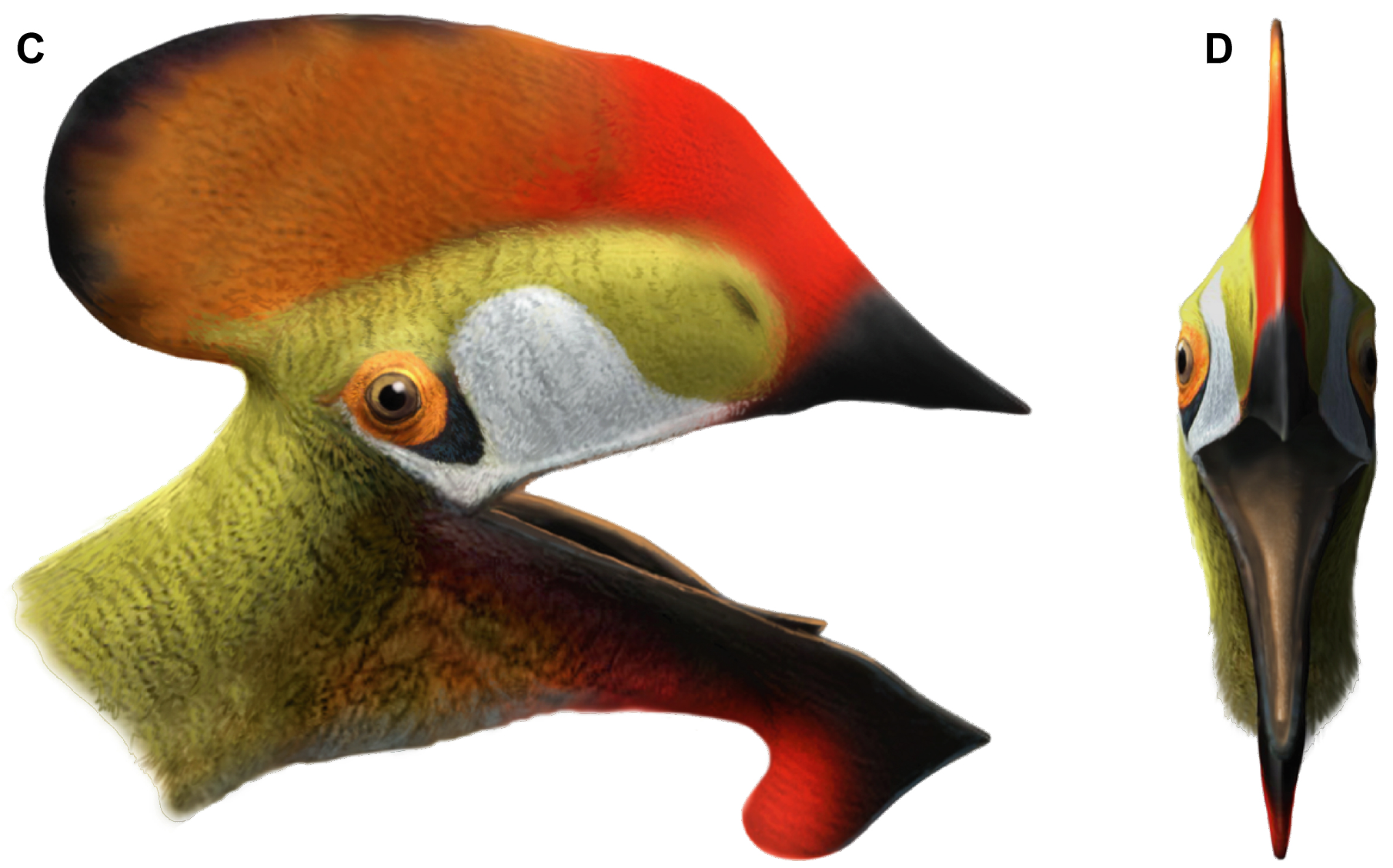
Life restorations showing the head from the side and front

The preserved part of the almost-complete mandible is 230 mm (9.1 in), with an estimated total length of 255 mm (10.0 in), and each mandibular ramus (halves that constituted the mandible) is 22 mm (0.87 in) in height. Most of their length is made up of the dentary bones. Each ramus is robust, and its upper and lower borders are parallel. The outer surface of each ramus is smooth, while the inner surface has shallow, well-marked depressions, and there is a bulge on the upper, inner surface of each dentary, a distinguishing combination for this genus. In side view, the cutting edge of the dentaries is slightly sigmoid curved in the area of the mandibular symphysis. The upper surface of the symphysis is concave in cross-section.

Europejara had a deep, bony crest that projected downward from the dentaries and was distinct from those of its relatives in being recurved backwards and more developed from top to bottom than from front to back. The crest was at least 90 mm (3.5 in) deep, four times deeper than the back of the lower jaw and therefore proportionally deeper than in other tapejarids. The dentary crest of Europejara was larger, better developed and deeper than those of the Chinese tapejarids Sinopterus and Huaxiadraco, while those of the Brazilian Tapejara and Tupandactylus were longer from front to back.

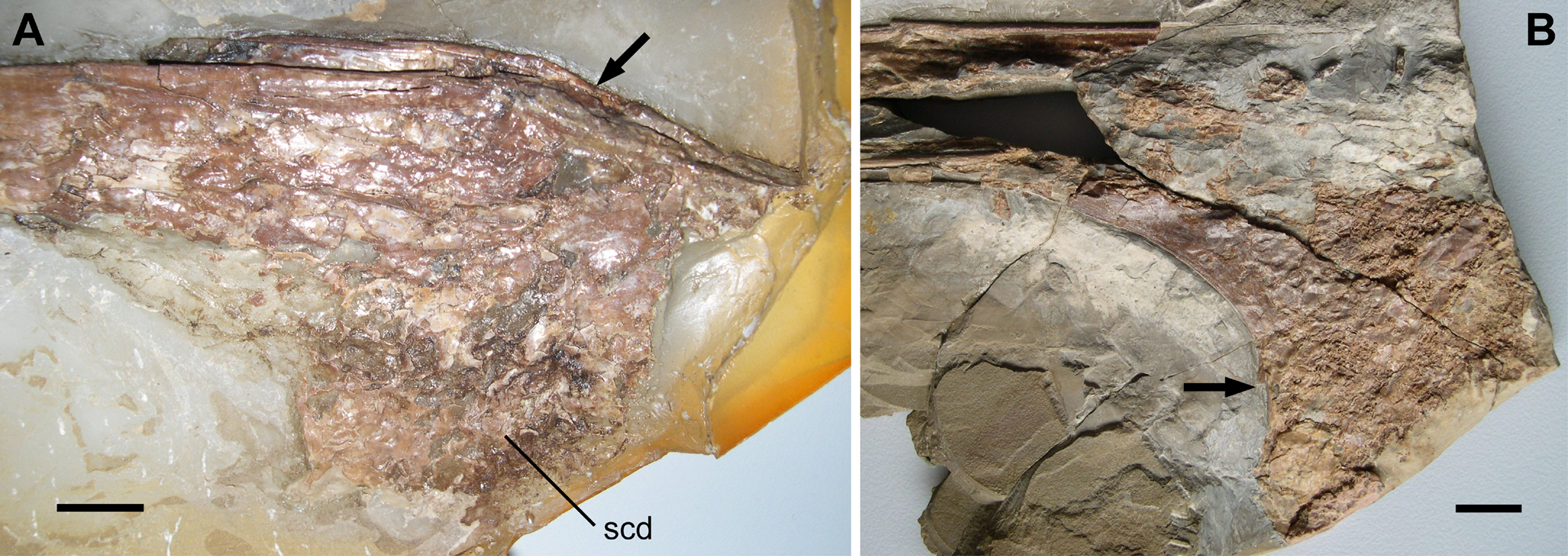
Close-ups of the lower jaws; A is the mandibular symphyseal area of the counterslab, B is the dentary crest of the main slab, whose orientation and shape are distinguishing features of this genus.

Both the premaxillary and dentary crests are low in Sinopterus and Huaxiadraco, while they are well-developed in Tapejara and Tupandactylus, indicating that their dimensions can be roughly correlated in tapejarids. Vullo and colleagues therefore inferred that the deep dentary crest of Europejara suggested that its premaxillary crest was relatively high, and may have been backwards recurved, reflecting the shape of the dentary crest.

== Classification ==
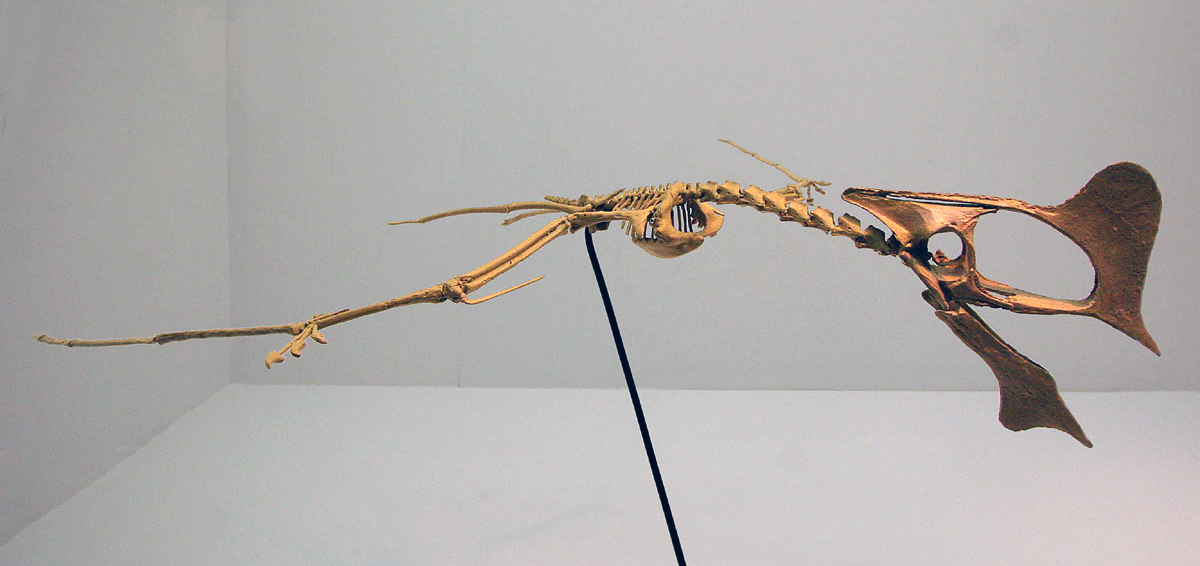
Reconstructed skeleton of the related Tapejara whose name is part of the basis for the name of Europejara

Europejara was classified as a member of the pterosaur family Tapejaridae by Vullo and colleagues in the phylogenetic analysis accompanying their 2012 description. At the time, this group was divided into two subfamilies; the long-faced and large-sized Thalassodrominae, and the short-faced and smaller-sized Tapejarinae, both with well-developed cranial crests. Europejara was assigned to the latter due to the presence of a dentary crest and a step-like upper edge at the symphyseal area of the dentary, a unique feature of tapejarines. The position of Europejara within Tapejarinae was poorly determined due to its incompleteness. The describers stated that the presence of a tapejarid in Spain during the Barremian age shows that the group was distributed earlier and more broadly throughout the palaeocontinents of Gondwana (the southern continent) and Laurasia (the northern continent) than previously known, living from Brazil to China.

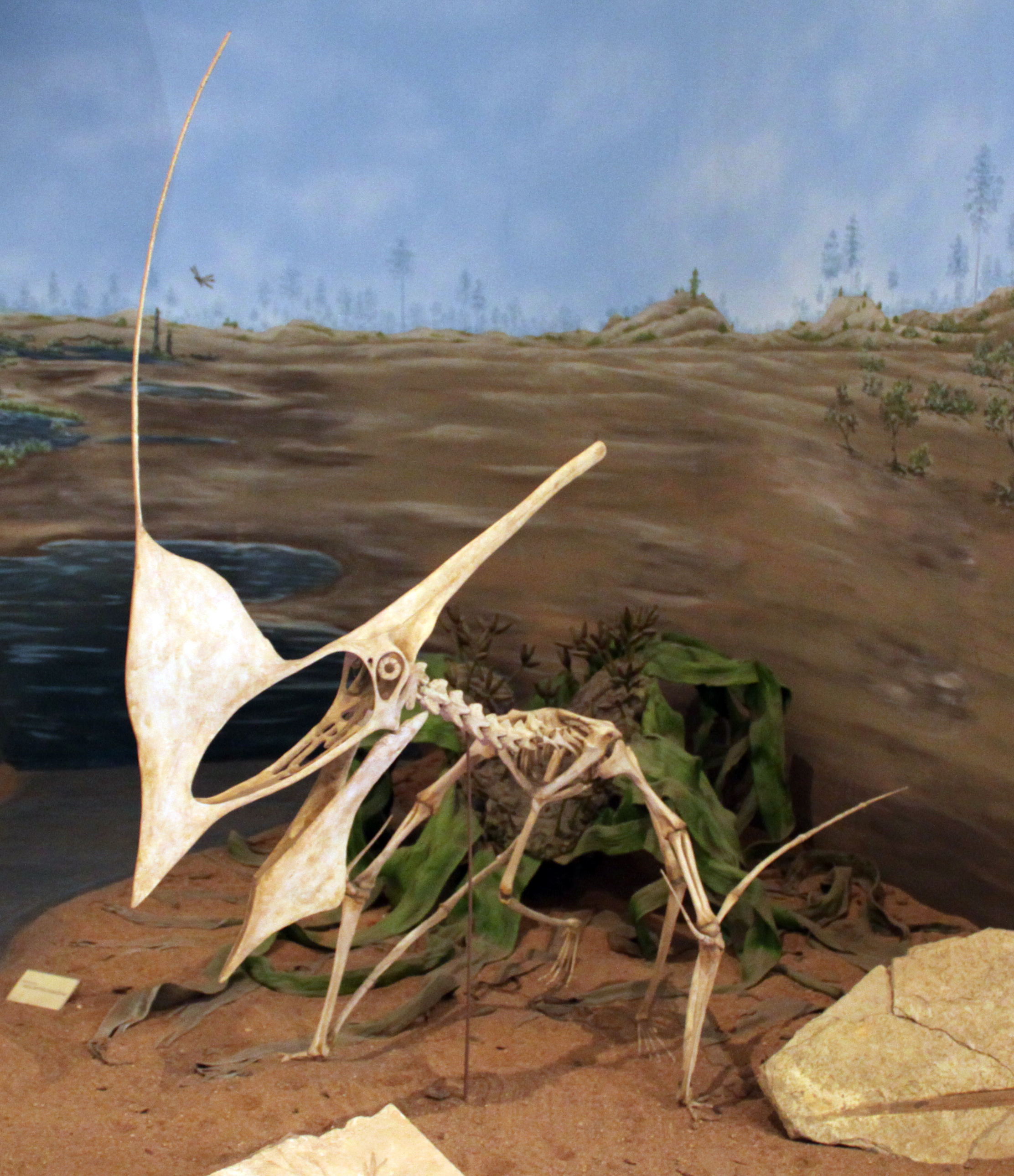
Reconstructed skeleton of the related Tupandactylus

Despite Europejara's phylogenetic position within Tapejarinae being unresolved, the describers suggested that it might be the sister group to a clade consisting of taxa from Brazil and China; this would be the most stratigraphically sound conclusion, as grouping Europejara with Chinese tapejarines would be inconsistent unless older Gondwanan taxa were found. As the oldest tapejarids were from the late Barremian of Spain and China, these authors suggested that the group originated in Eurasia near the beginning of the Early Cretaceous rather than in Gondwana, and could have spread to Brazil during the later Aptian. The occurrence of a tapejarid in the Cenomanian of Morocco suggests that the group diversified in Gondwana during the mid-Cretaceous, but these authors cautioned that knowledge about tapejarid evolution and palaeobiogeography was affected by uneven fossil sampling. They added that the absence of the group in North American, European, and African deposits from the Aptian–Albian could be due to the lack of pterosaur-bearing sites in those regions at that time.

In their 2016 description of the tapejarid Aymberedactylus, the palaeontologist Rubi Vargas Pêgas and colleagues found Europejara to be the sister group of the Brazilian genera Caiuajara, Tapejara, and Tupandactylus. Earlier studies found Chinese tapejarines to be basal (earlier diverging) to the Brazilian taxa, concluding that Laurasia was therefore the group's likely place of origin, with the older age of these and Europejara used as evidence. These researchers noted that, since Chinese tapejarines form a monophyletic (natural) clade rather than a paraphyletic (unnatural) group, this does not support a Laurasian origin over a Gondwanan one, and that their sister group, Thalassodrominae, was restricted to South America. On the other hand, the existence of early tapejarines in Brazil and the exclusive presence of Thalassodrominae there point in favour of an origin for the group in Gondwana. That Chinese tapejarines were monophyletic would support them representing a single dispersal to China; Europejara would represent another dispersal to Europe, since it was related to South American tapejarines, but the authors noted more work was needed to support these interpretations.

The palaeontologist Alexander W. Kellner (one of the describers of Europejara) and colleagues named the tribe Tapejarini for the clade containing Europejara and its Brazilian relatives in their 2019 description of Keresdrakon. The palaeontologist Gabriela M. Cerqueira and colleagues reached similar conclusions as Pêgas and colleagues in their 2020 description of Kariridraco. The cladogram below follows a phylogenetic analysis by Pêgas from her 2025 description of Torukjara, following a scheme where thalassodromids were excluded from Tapejaridae and considered their own family.

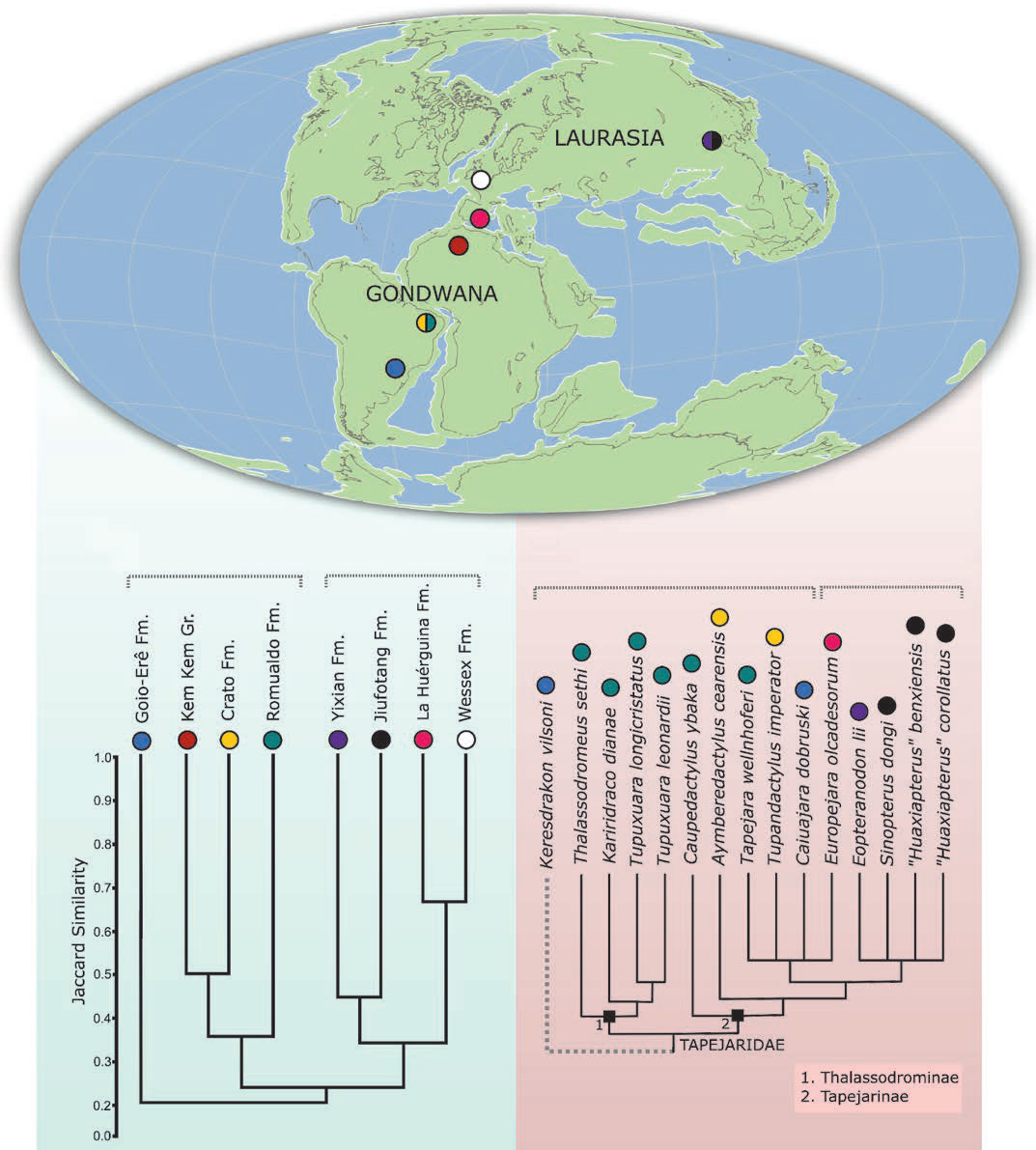
Cretaceous paleomap showing where Europejara (magenta, middle) and its relatives have been found

- Tapejaromorpha
  - Thalassodromidae
  - Tapejariformes
    - Caupedactylia
      - Aymberedactylus cearensis
      - Caupedactylus ybaka
    - Tapejaridae
      - Tapejarinae
        - Europejara olcadesorum
        - - - Tupandactylus imperator
            - Tupandactylus navigans
          - - Tapejara wellnhoferi
            - Caiuajarina
              - Caiuajara dobruskii
              - Torukjara bandeirae
      - Sinopterinae
        - - Huaxiadraco corollatus
          - - Eopteranodon lii
            - Sinopterus dongi
        - - Wightia declivirostris
          - - Afrotapejara zouhri
            - Bakonydraco galaczi

The description of Hintighernia from the Cretaceous Cambridge Greensand of England by Pêgas and colleagues in 2026 further confirmed that Europe was an important region in the evolution of Tapejaridae and a centre of the group's early radiation (potentially from where they spread to Asia and South America).

== Palaeobiology ==
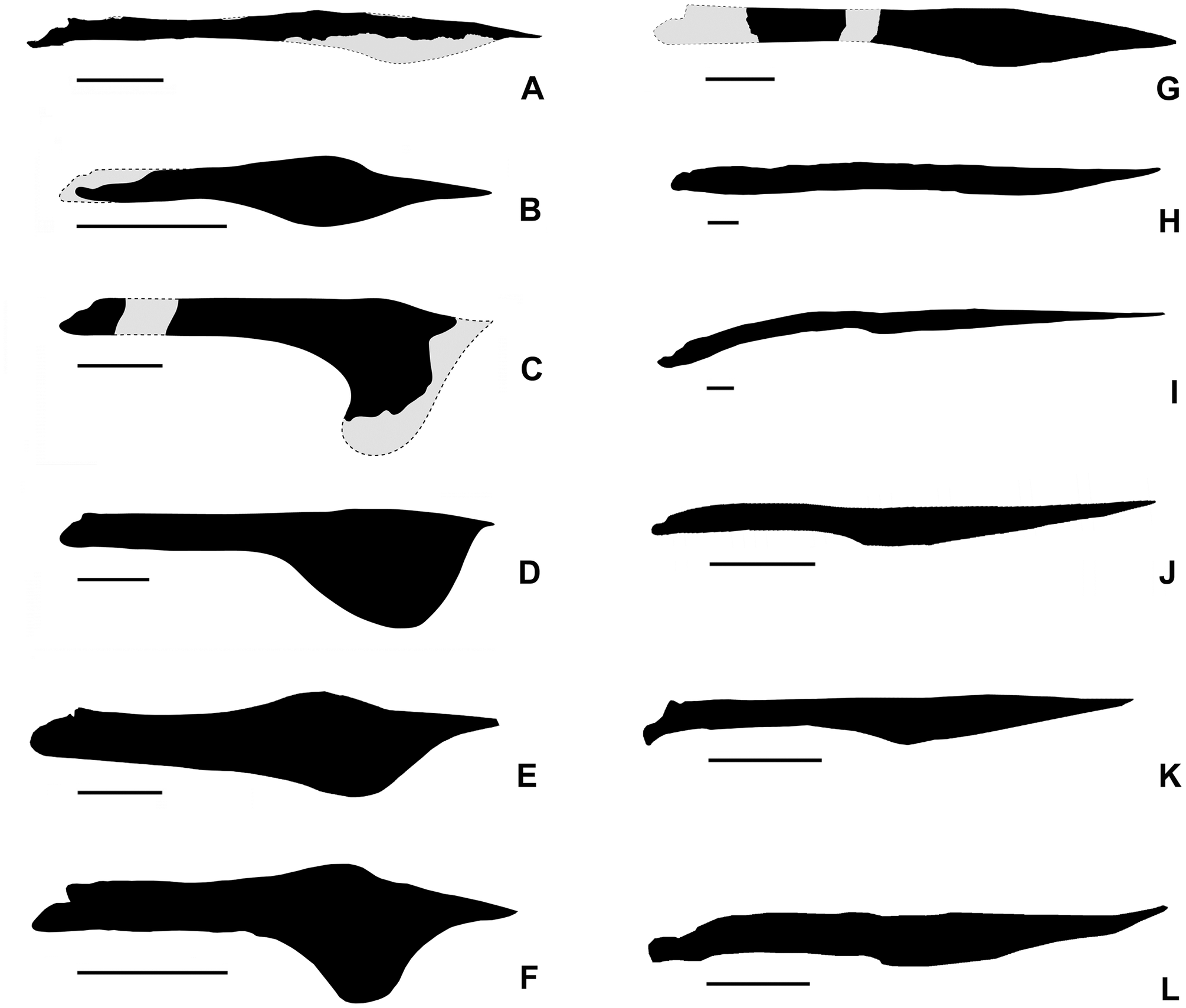
Comparison of azhdarchoid mandibles; A–G are tapejarids, Europejara is C.

Writing in 2012, Vullo and colleagues found the shape of Europejaras dentary crest to be unlike any previously described among pterosaurs. They noted that the purpose of such a deep and recurved crest at the midline of the mandible remains unclear, but there may have been multiple functions, such as use in aerodynamics, thermoregulation, social behavior, or to support a gular pouch (a sac on the neck to store food). Well-developed bony cranial crests are known from various pterosaur groups, but mandibular crests are only known from anhanguerids and tapejarids, as well as some early non-pterodactyloids (long-tailed pterosaurs).

The palaeontologist Mark Witton summarised ideas of tapejarid locomotor abilities in 2013, stating that tapejarids were adaptable, generalist fliers, similar to extant parrots and crows. Their relatively short wings appear consistent with flying in inland areas, and their long limbs and probably well-muscled limb girdles would have made them adept at launching and flapping. It is uncertain what effect their large crests had on their flight abilities, and Witton considered a primary role in display and socialisation most likely; their presence would have impacted their steering and speed in windy conditions. Witton stated that tapejarids would have been well-adapted to moving on the ground owing to their long, powerful limbs and compact, padded feet.

=== Diet ===
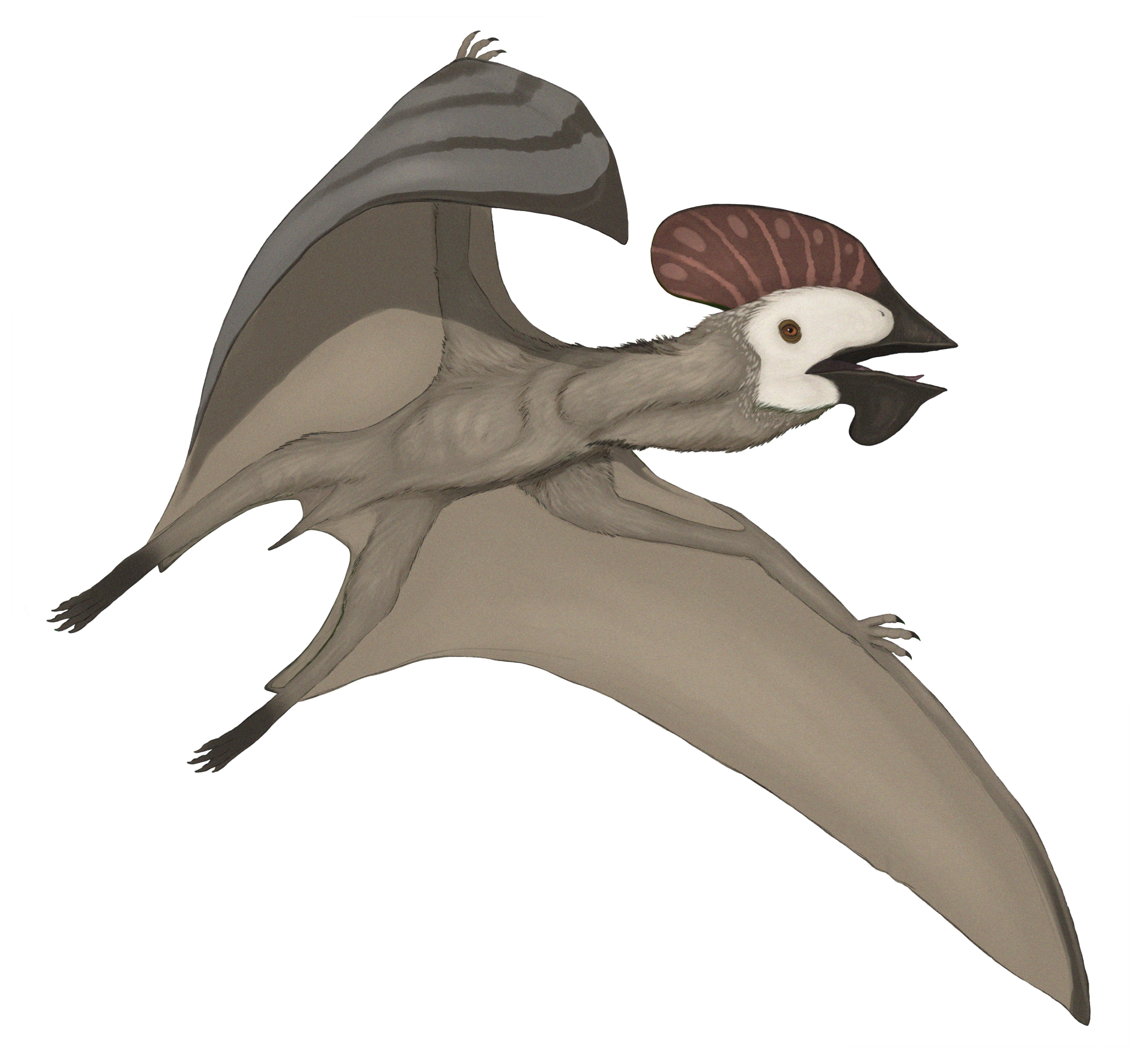
Hypothetical life restoration showing Europejara in flight; it has been suggested that tapejarids were seed dispersers.

Since Europejara showed tapejarids were the oldest-known toothless pterosaurs, Vullo and colleagues suggested this feature was linked to pterosaurs developing new feeding strategies during the Early Cretaceous (145–99 million years ago). Toothlessness probably evolved independently at least three times among pterosaurs. Tapejarids are thought to have been good fliers with excellent vision and have mainly been considered frugivorous (fruit-eaters) and/or granivorous (seed-eaters), based on their short skulls, downturned and unusually shaped jaws, and their lack of teeth. The beak was probably covered by a rhamphotheca (a keratinous covering), and while shaped like the underlying bone as in modern birds, the bills of some tapejarids might have had pointed projections as in omnivorous birds such as toucans. While conceding this comparison lacks fossil evidence, these researchers suggested tapejarids could also have had a herbivorous or omnivorous diet that included seeds, fruits, insects, and small vertebrate animals.

The Cretaceous Terrestrial Revolution was a turnover event in the ecosystems of the Cretaceous in which gymnosperm plants (which do not produce flowers and whose seeds are not encased in an outer covering) were replaced by angiosperms (flowering plants), associated with the diversification of insects, birds and mammals. Vullo and colleagues noted that the role of pterosaurs had not been previously considered in this event, but pointed out that an effective mode of seed dispersal by vertebrates would have aided the rapid, worldwide spread of angiosperms. The Early Cretaceous La Huérguina Formation in Spain and the Yixian and Jiufotang formations in China preserve fossils of organisms that may have lived in subtropical wet, forested and lacustrine (associated with lakes) environments that contained an abundance of early angiosperms, and these authors found this to support the presence of frugivorous and granivorous pterosaurs that would have dispersed seeds with birds and insects.

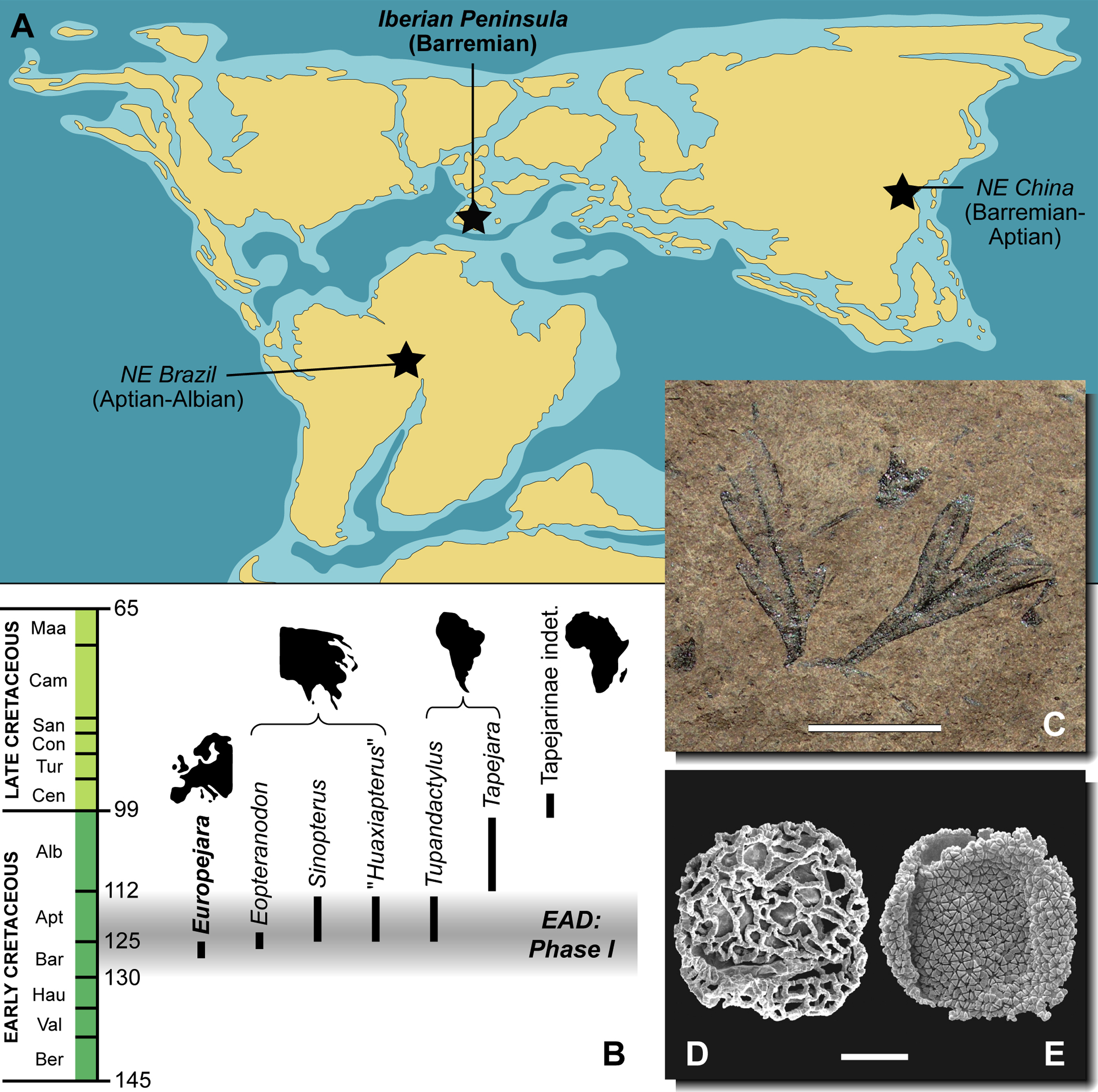
Distribution through time and space of tapejarids and early angiosperm plants. The inset photos show leaves and pollen from the La Huérguina Formation.

Tapejarids were part of these trophic networks (interconnected systems of food chains) during the Cretaceous Terrestrial Revolution, and their distinct features may have been connected to angiosperm dispersal; tapejarids and early angiosperms radiated (species diversified) at the same time and had a similar patchy distribution in time and space. Vullo and colleagues therefore suggested that the Barremian–Aptian distribution of tapejarids partially coincided with the first phase of angiosperm radiation in both the world's hemispheres. Angiosperm diversification during that time is documented by Iberian fossils; the Aptian–Albian Crato and Santana Formations of Brazil also contain early angiosperm assemblages and tapejarids. The describers considered this evidence for congruence between the early radiation of angiosperms and that of tapejarids, and for pterosaurs having been one of the biological vectors dispersing flowers between landmasses. They cautioned that more research was required to establish whether the two groups co-evolved or if tapejarids were incidental vectors, with more fossils and gut-content needed for confirmation.

In 2025, the palaeontologist Shunxing Jiang and colleagues reported stomach contents from a specimen of the tapejarid Sinopterus. These include gastroliths (stones used to aid food processing in the gizzard) and the first evidence of phytoliths in pterosaurs (minerals found in certain plants which persist after their decomposition) and of these objects co-occurring in a pterosaur. Some of the phytoliths were identified as belonging to the angiosperm family Poaceae (grasses), as well as to gymnosperms or ferns, indicating that Sinopterus had a diverse plant diet. In agreement with earlier indirect evidence, these researchers considered the gut contents confirmation of herbivory. They excluded a generalist diet for Sinopterus as no undigested bones, scales, or insect exoskeletons were found. They stated that bite-force estimations of Tapejara had suggested a herbivorous diet of fruits, seeds, and more resistant plant matter, and added that the similarity between the skulls of Tapejara and Sinopterus indicated similar bite forces, supporting a herbivorous diet for both.

== Palaeoenvironment ==
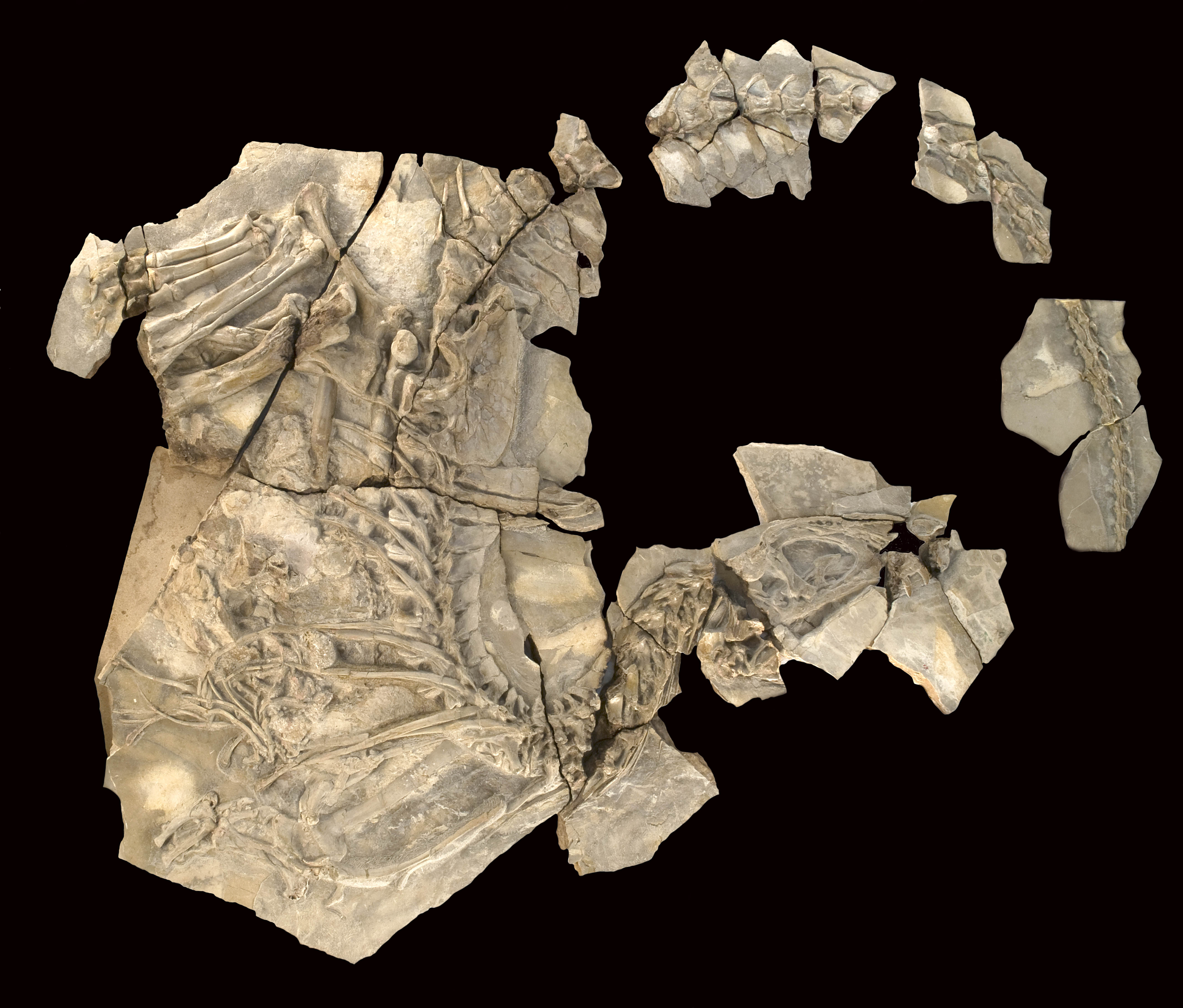
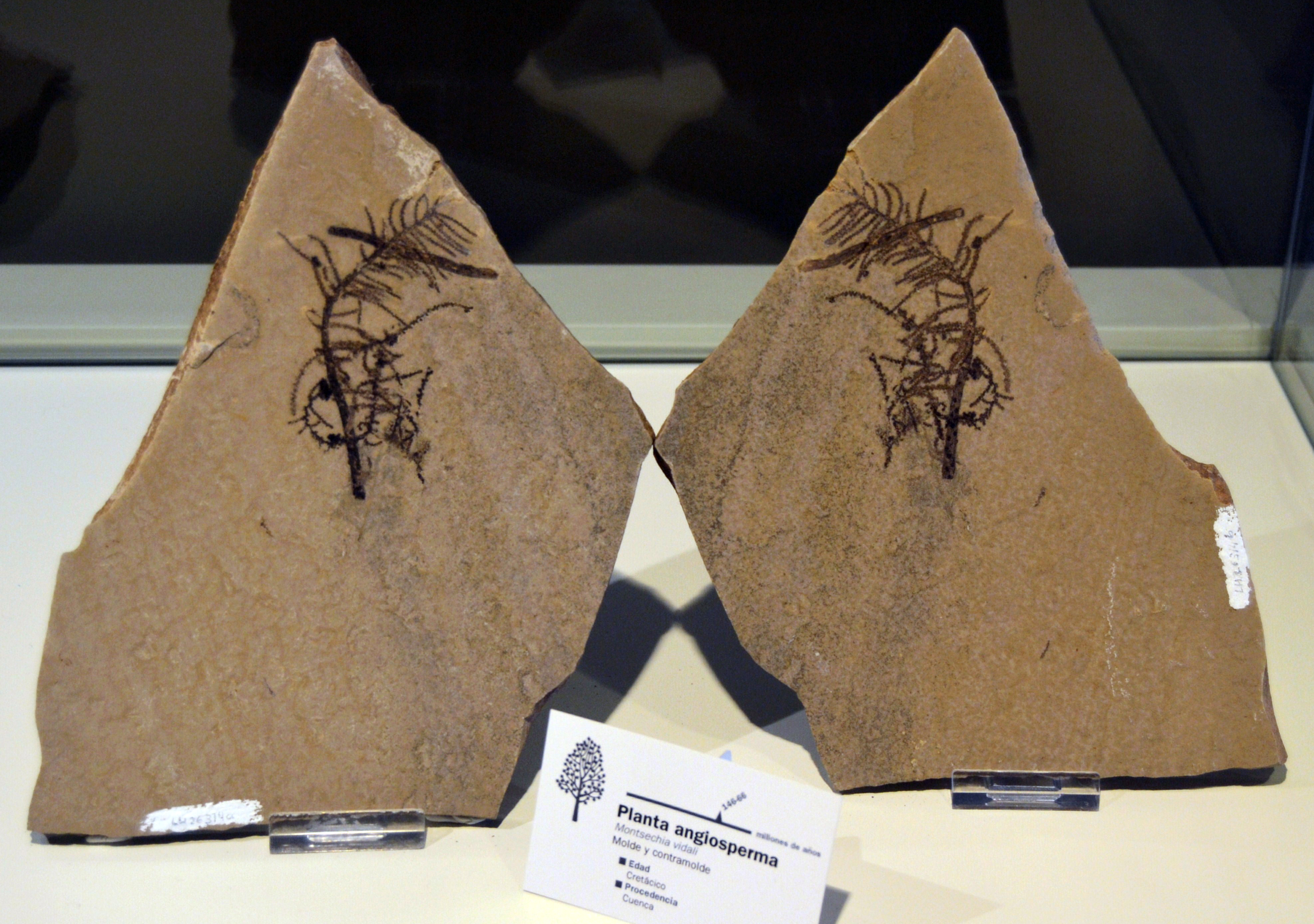
Fossils of the dinosaur Concavenator and the angiosperm Montsechia, also from the Las Hoyas site

The Las Hoyas site in the La Huérguina Formation, from which Europejara was recovered, has been dated to the late Barremian of the Early Cretaceous. This dating is based on assemblages of charophyte algae and ostracod crustaceans, and the fossiliferous deposits are composed of laminated limestone and rarer marlstone. The Late Barremian has been previously dated to about 129.4–126.3 million years ago, but the age of the Barremian boundaries has since been changed to different values. These deposits represent a continental, subtropical wetland environment, between a lacustrine environment and a tree fern-dominated savannah, which overlaid a low-relief karstic terrain. The vertebrate fossils of this Konservat-Lagerstätte are notable for their articulation and preservation of mineralised soft tissue, but less complete, isolated remains are also present. Preservation at the site is so thorough that certain taxa have been preserved with their internal organs intact, and even bacteria have been reported.

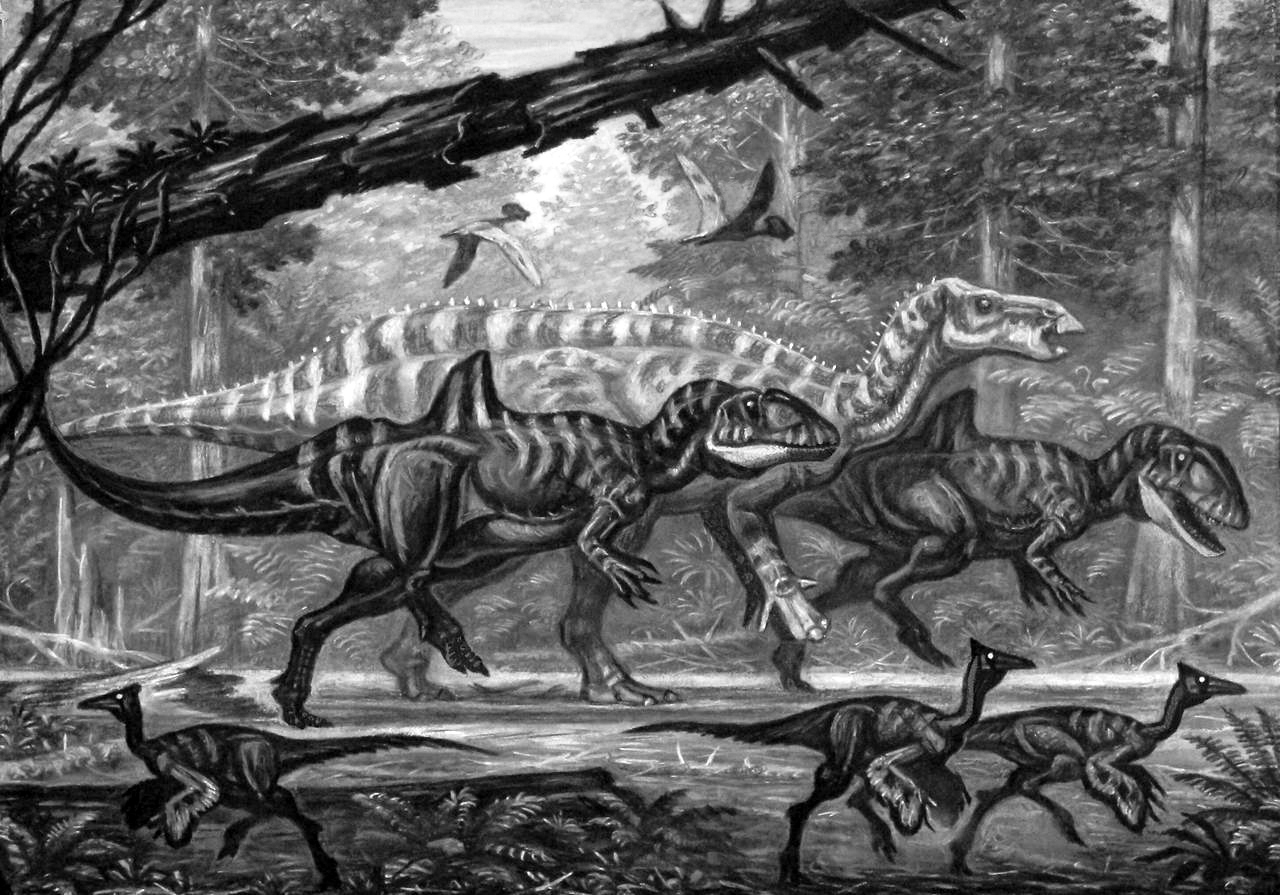
Hypothetical life restoration of animals known from Las Hoyas, including two Europejara in the upper background

The biota (a region with distinct climate and ecosystem) of Las Hoyas is intermediate between Jurassic and other Early Cretaceous biotas, and is thus representative of the early stages of the Cretaceous Terrestrial Revolution. The terrestrial macroflora of Las Hoyas is dominated by conifers of the family Cheirolepidiaceae and ferns of the families Matoniacea and Schizaeaceae, as well as relatively diverse angiosperms. The oldest known aquatic angiosperm macrofossil, Montsechia, comes from this site. While most of the terrestrial plant microfossils from the formation are pteridophytes and gymnosperms, there is a significant amount of angiosperm pollen grains, such as Afropollis and Clavatipollenites, as well as leaves.

The biota of Las Hoyas consists mainly of aquatic organisms, with amphibious forms less abundant, terrestrial forms rare, and large forms (such as dinosaurs) exceptional. Pterosaurs are rare; in addition to Europejara, a few teeth indicate the presence of a large anhanguerid and a small istiodactylid. Non-bird theropod dinosaurs are represented by the carcharodontosaurid Concavenator and the ornithomimosaur Pelecanimimus, as well as several taxa known only from teeth. Birds include Concornis, Eoalulavis, and Iberomesornis. The ornithischian Mantellisaurus has been identified there, as have dinosaur footprints. Crocodyliforms are represented by Cassissuchus and trackways presumably left by goniopholidids. Lepidosaurs include Scandensia, and Jucaraseps. The eutriconodont mammal Spinolestes, a specimen of which preserves internal organs, is from Las Hoyas. An albanerpetontid amphibian, Celtedens, is known. Roughly twenty species of fish, including species previously thought to have lived exclusively in saltwater, constitute the known fish fauna. The invertebrate fauna is represented primarily by insects, especially aquatic beetles.

== See also ==
- List of pterosaur genera
- Timeline of pterosaur research
