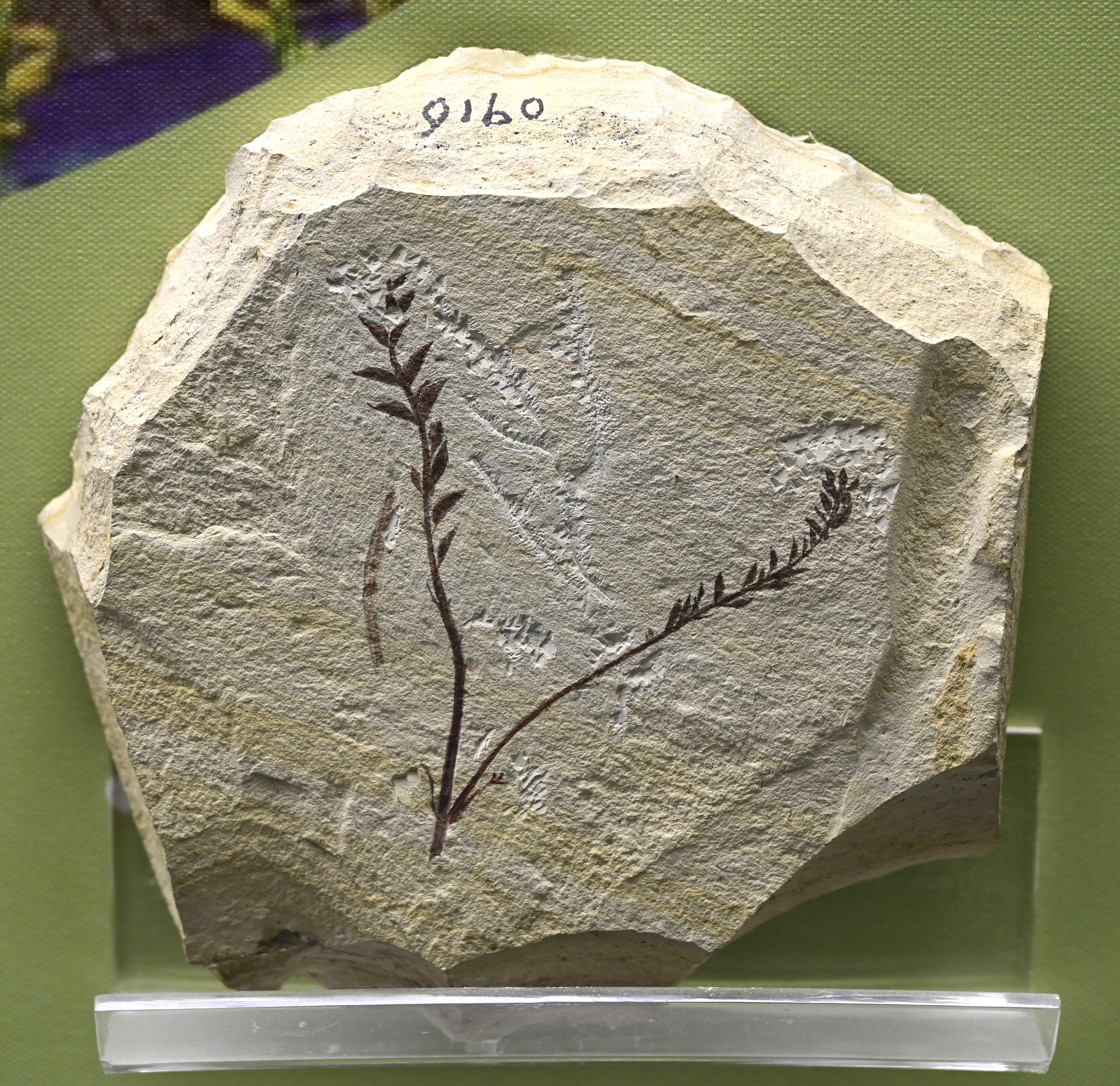
- A. liaoningensis fossil, National Natural History Museum of China

Scientific classification
- Kingdom: Plantae
- Clade: Embryophytes
- Clade: Tracheophytes
- Clade: Angiosperms
- Order: incertae sedis
- Family: †Archaefructaceae; Sun et al
- Genus: †Archaefructus; Sun et al

Species
- †Archaefructus eoflora; †Archaefructus liaoningensis; †Archaefructus sinensis

= Archaefructus =

Archaefructus Temporal range: Early Cretaceous 125 Ma

Extinct genus of herbaceous aquatic seed plants

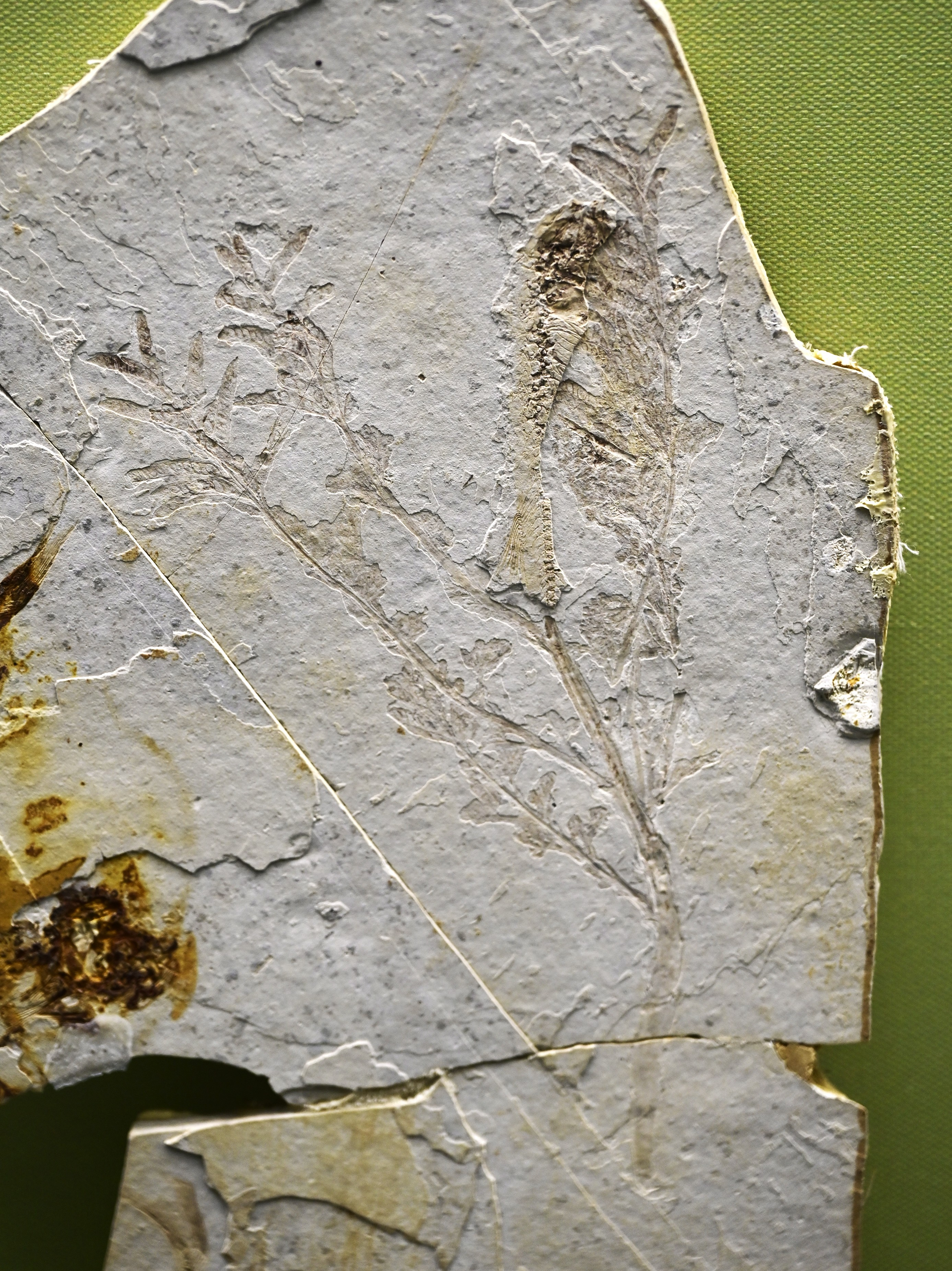
Fossil specimen, National Natural History Museum of China

Archaefructus is an extinct genus of herbaceous aquatic seed plants with three known species. Fossil material assigned to this genus originates from the Yixian Formation in northeastern China, originally dated as late Jurassic but now understood to be approximately 125 million years old, or early Cretaceous in age. Even with its revised age, Archaefructus has been proposed to be one of the earliest known genera of flowering plants.

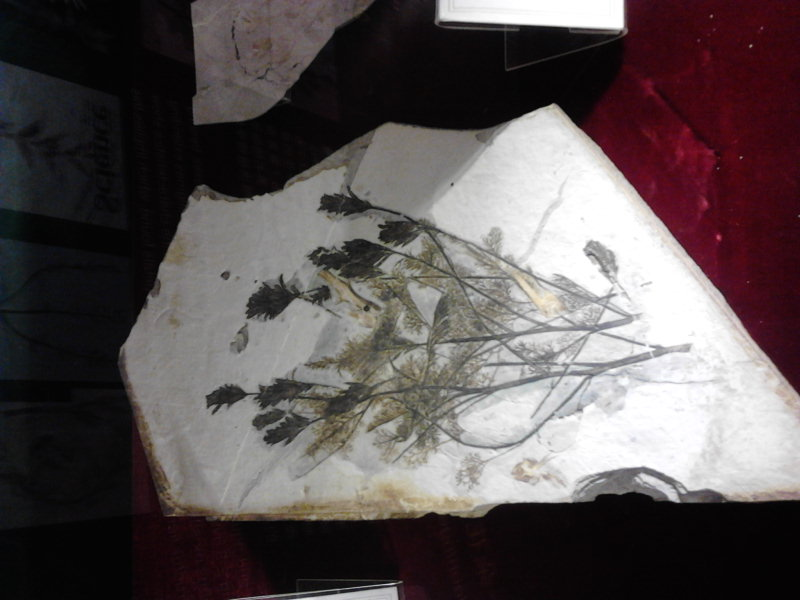

Because of its age, lack of sepals and petals, and the fact that its reproductive organs (carpels and stamens), are produced on an elongate stem rather than condensed into a flower as in modern angiosperms, Archaefructaceae has been proposed as a new basal angiosperm family. An alternative interpretation of the same fossil, however, interprets the elongate stem as an inflorescence rather than a flower, with staminate (male) flowers below and pistillate (female) flower above. The discovery of Archaefructus eoflora supports this interpretation, because a bisexual flower is present in the region between staminate and pistillate organs. If this interpretation is correct, Archaefructus may not be basal within the angiosperms, rather it may be close to the Nymphaeales or the basal eudicots.

== See also ==
- Montsechia vidalii
