= Polar forests of the Cretaceous =

Cretaceous polar forests were temperate forests that grew at polar latitudes towards the end of the Mesozoic Era, known as the Cretaceous Period (145–66 Ma). At this time, global average temperature was about 10 °C (18 °F) higher and carbon dioxide (CO_{2}) levels were around 1000 parts per million (ppm), 2.5 times the current concentration in Earth's atmosphere. High atmospheric carbon dioxide is one of the main causes of a pronounced greenhouse Earth in the Cretaceous, with a low global temperature gradient. This means that high latitudes in both hemispheres were much warmer than they are now, and the Earth lacked ice caps.

High temperatures strengthened Earth's water cycle by moisture evaporation from the ocean surface. Absolute sea levels were much higher than they are today. Continental encroachment of seawater formed widespread shallow seas with some epeiric seas.

== Cretaceous polar forests ==
During the Cretaceous, temperate forests thrived at polar latitudes, as there was a notable difference from current conditions at high latitudes. Summer sunlight and winter darkness lasted for about 5 months each. This variation in light affected the composition and evolution of polar forests. Fossilized flora evidence suggests there were ancient forests up to latitudes of 85° in both Northern and Southern hemispheres. The dominant forms of vegetation at these high latitudes during the previous 100 million years were changing during a time known as the Cretaceous Terrestrial Revolution. During the Cretaceous Terrestrial Revolution, conifers, cycads and ferns were selectively replaced by angiosperms and gymnosperms, becoming the main species at high latitudes. In this Cretaceous greenhouse world, Arctic forests were mostly deciduous, while those that grew on Antarctica had a higher proportion of evergreens.

The first angiosperm blooms made it to Australia 126 million years ago.

=== Forest diversification ===
In the early Cretaceous, about 130 million years ago, there was a major diversification of angiosperms that caused evolutionary change in high latitude forests. This diversification of angiosperms was connected to a coevolutionary diversification of pollen and nectar collecting insects that increased the rate of speciation. By the end of the Cretaceous, species of polar forest regions diversified by about 50-80%. This transition from conifers, cycads and ferns to angiosperms reflects an evolutionary adaptation to the regional polar climate and possibly other factors like sea-floor spreading rates, eustatic sea level and high global temperatures.

=== Ecological productivity ===
Poleward displacement of the temperate zone in the Cretaceous elevated forest primary productivity. At high to mid latitudes, forest productivity was twice as high as at lower latitudes. This is strongly linked to high atmospheric carbon dioxide concentrations. Results from the experiments on deciduous and evergreen tree growth under various carbon dioxide concentrations show differing impacts.

There are four main factors that contribute to net forest productivity: carbon dioxide concentration, root respiration rates, temperature and photosynthesis. Carbon dioxide alone tends to decrease leaf and root respiration by lowering the light compensation point of photosynthesis, which allows a net gain in carbon intake during the day. The reduction of root respiration causes root growth and improves nutrient and water uptake. When photosynthesis is added to the effects of carbon dioxide, depending on regional temperature, forest productivity is drastically increased. The combination of all four factors leads to a net increase in forest productivity. Tree species with long lived evergreen foliage benefit the most in a carbon dioxide rich environment because of their longer growing season and adaptations like canopy development that would allow them to thrive in the temperate polar latitudes of the Cretaceous.

== Fossilized forest ==
Polar Cretaceous forests were mainly made up of deciduous conifers, ferns, angiosperms and gymnosperms. The most abundant and widespread plants were araucarioid and podocarpoid conifers, extending about 80° into each hemisphere and comprising more than 90% of the canopy generating evergreen vegetation. Other conifers, though abundant, were confined by regional climates to mid and low latitudes in each hemisphere. As global climate evolved, the rise of angiosperms put pressure on conifers at higher latitudes by growing taller and ultimately winning the battle for sunlight. Angiosperm species became the dominant tree type by the mid-Cretaceous. By the Late Cretaceous, a temperate climate in both the Northern and Southern hemisphere was ideal for the rapid diversification and distribution of various angiosperms and to a lesser extent, conifers. Forests near the North Pole were mainly mixed evergreen and deciduous trees, but forests near the South Pole were mainly evergreens.

Museum Ledge is a prominent locality for fossilized wood found on the southwest shoulder of Mount Glossopteris.

=== Paleoclimate proxies ===
A paleoclimate indicator, also known as a proxy, can tell us what the global climate may have been like in the past. Studies of tree growth rings, deep sea cores, ice cores and paleosols are common proxies used to evaluate paleoclimates.

=== Paleothermometry ===
A key tool for paleothermometry reconstruction is analysis of isotope-ratio mass spectrometry data on stable isotopes such as those of hydrogen and oxygen. Studies on marine (planktonic/benthic) foraminifera and bulk carbonate isotope ratios in the mid-Cretaceous suggest a continual warming period from ~100 Ma to 66 Ma. At this time, the southern high latitudes were as cool as 16 °C (61 °F) and as warm as 32 °C (90 °F). Temperatures of Cretaceous northern high latitudes were deduced from oxygen isotope analysis of well-preserved brachiopod and molluscan shells. Temperature fluctuations correspond to seasonal variation ranging from 10 to 22 °C (50 to 72 °F).

=== Dendrochronology on Cretaceous wood ===
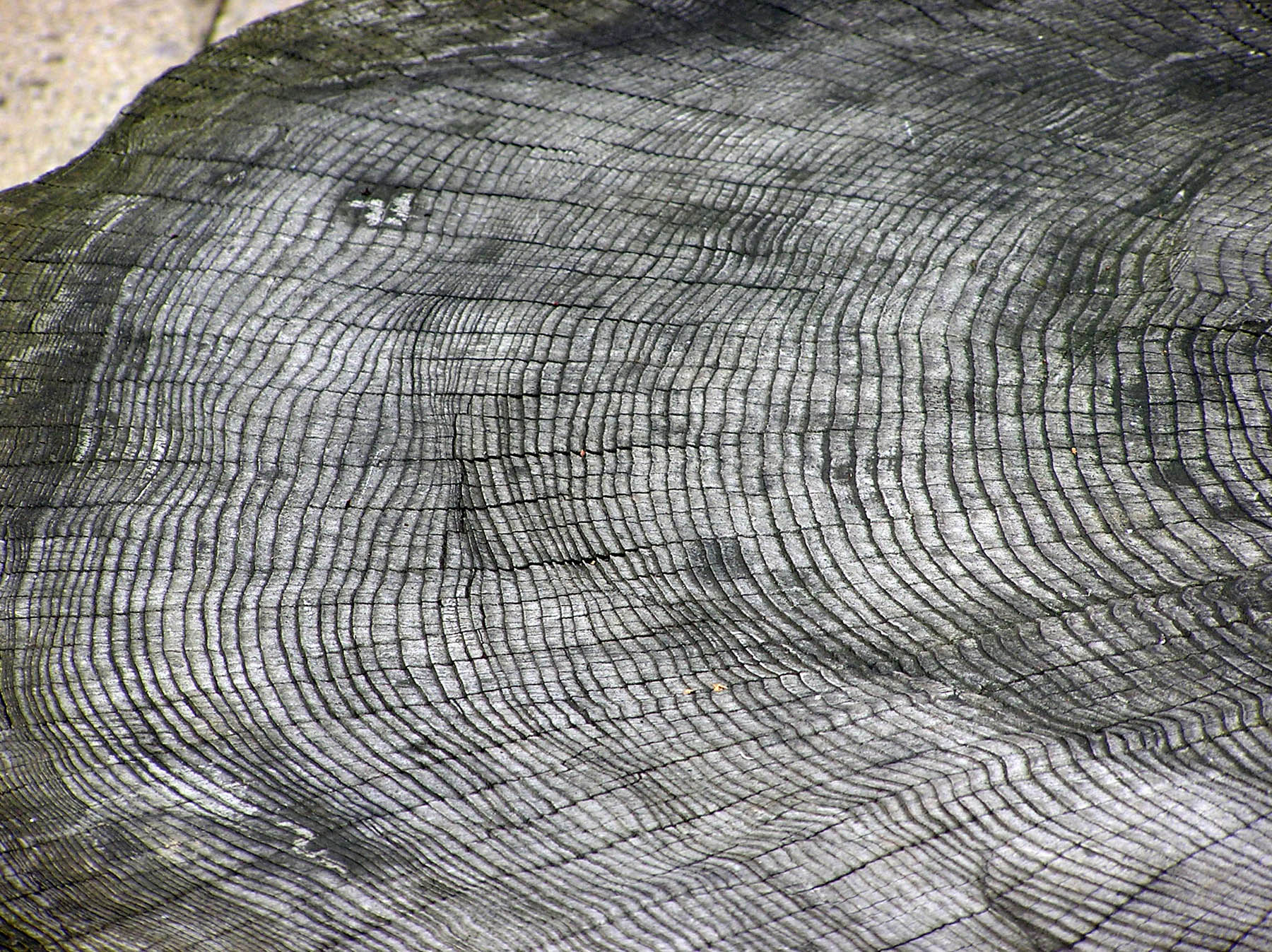
Fossilized tree growth rings

Growth ring measurements from the Cretaceous can show what the climate might have been like in various parts of the Earth. Pattern analysis of tree rings or growth rings from Cretaceous fossil woods are mainly used to make inferences into paleoclimate and forest productivity. A useful method for tree growth ring dating is dendrochronology.

Most studies of fossilized wood assume that processes related to past tree growth rates are identical to those in the present, uniformitarianism. On this basis, forest productivity can be inferred from growth rings in Cretaceous trees. Annual tree growth rates at low latitudes were significantly higher than at present. In polar latitudes, productivity was even more significantly improved relative to today. Dendrochronology of fossilized wood growth rings from high latitudes suggests the presence of greenhouse-like climatic conditions on a global scale during this time period.
