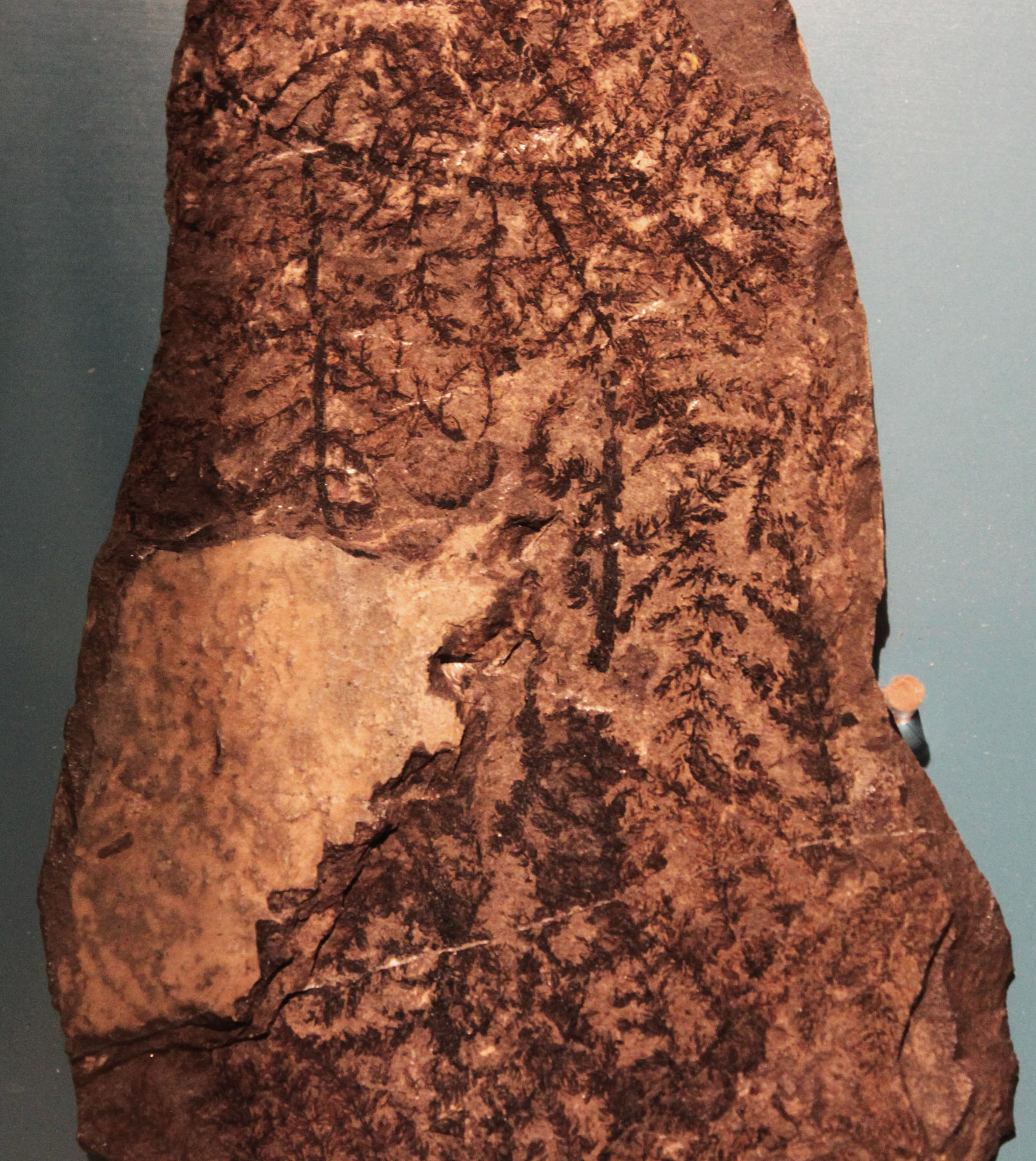

Scientific classification
- Kingdom: Plantae
- Clade: Tracheophytes
- Clade: Angiosperms
- Order: Ceratophyllales
- Family: †Montsechiaceae; B.Gomez et al.
- Genus: †Montsechia; C.Teixeira
- Species: †M. vidalii

Binomial name
- †Montsechia vidalii (Zeiler) C.Teixeira

= Montsechia =

Montsechia Temporal range: Barremian

Extinct genus of aquatic plants

Montsechia is an extinct genus of aquatic plants containing the species Montsechia vidalii, described from Spain. M. vidalii lived about 130 million years ago, during the Barremian age, and appears to be the earliest known flowering plant macrofossil. It has affinities with the modern genus Ceratophyllum. It has been placed in the ceratophyllalean family Montsechiaceae.

== See also ==
- Archaefructus
