= Cretaceous Terrestrial Revolution =

Time of intense flowering plant diversification

The Cretaceous Terrestrial Revolution (abbreviated KTR), also known as the Angiosperm Terrestrial Revolution (ATR) by authors who consider it to have lasted into the Paleogene, describes the intense floral diversification of flowering plants (angiosperms) and the coevolution of pollinating insects (especially anthophilans and lepidopterans), as well as the subsequent faunal radiation of various frugivorous, nectarivorous and insectivorous terrestrial animals then at the lower food web levels such as mammals, avialans (early birds and close relatives), squamate reptiles (lizards and snakes), lissamphibians (especially frogs) and web-spinning spiders, during the Cretaceous period.

After the K-Pg extinction event devastated the Mesozoic terrestrial ecosystems and wiped out nearly all animals weighing more than 25 kg (55 lb), the survivors among these smaller animals that thrived during the KTR recovered first to reoccupy the ecological niches vacated by the extinction of non-avian dinosaurs and pterosaurs, and therefore became the dominant clades of the Cenozoic terrestrial faunas. Flowering plants also quickly became the mainstream florae during the Cenozoic, replacing the previously more prevalent gymnosperms and ferns.

== Duration ==
The KTR is traditionally considered to have started in the Early Cretaceous and continued to the Late Cretaceous, from around 125 Mya to 80 Mya. Alternatively, according to Michael Benton, the ATR is proposed to have lasted from 100 Ma, when the first highly diverse angiosperm leaf floras are known, to 50 Ma, during the Early Eocene Climatic Optimum, by which point most crown lineages of angiosperms had evolved.

== Appearance of angiosperms ==
Molecular clock analyses of angiosperm evolution suggest that crown group angiosperms may have diverged up to 100 million years before the start of the KTR, although this is possibly due to artefacts of the inabilities of molecular clock estimates to account for explosive accelerations in evolution that may have caused the extremely fast diversification of angiosperms shortly after their first appearance in the fossil record.

== Causes ==
The KTR was enabled by the dispersed positions of the continents and the formation of new oceans during the Cretaceous in the aftermath of Pangaea's breakup in the preceding Jurassic period, which enhanced the hydrological cycle and promoted the expansion of temperate climatic zones, fuelling radiations of angiosperms. Among mammals, enhanced tectonic activity generated diversity increases by increasing montane habitats, which promote increased diversity in hot climates.

Another cause of the explosive angiosperm diversification was the evolution of leaf vein densities greater than 2.5–5 mm/mm^{2}, when the leaf interior transport path length of water became shorter than the leaf interior transport path length of CO_{2}. This enabled greater utilisation of CO_{2} and gave an evolutionary advantage to flowering plants over conifers because they could sequester more CO_{2} for the same amount of water. The much greater capacity of angiosperms for assimilating CO_{2} sharply increased global bioproductivity.

The drying of many terrestrial ecosystems during the Middle Cretaceous Hothouse (MKH) benefitted angiosperms, which were able to survive hot and dry environments, and the increased fire activity helped to enhance diversification of angiosperms. Angiosperms enabled more frequent fires than gymnosperms, and they also recovered more quickly from fires than gymnosperms did. This created a feedback loop that advantaged angiosperms over gymnosperms during the Cretaceous.

== Biotic effects ==
Although angiosperm diversity drastically grew over the Cretaceous, this did not necessarily translate to ecological dominance, which they only achieved in the Early Cenozoic. Angiosperms responded to increasing coevolution with frugivores by enlarging the sizes of their fruits, which peaked during the Early Eocene.

Before Lloyd et al.'s 2008 paper described the KTR, it had been widely accepted in paleontology that new families of dinosaurs evolved during the Middle to Late Cretaceous, including the euhadrosaurs, neoceratopsians, ankylosaurids, pachycephalosaurs, carcharodontosaurines, troodontids, dromaeosaurs and ornithomimosaurs. However, the authors of the paper have suggested that the apparent "new diversification" of dinosaurs during this time is due to sampling biases in the fossil record, and better preserved fossils in Cretaceous age sediments than in earlier Triassic or Jurassic sediments. Furthermore, the diversification of different dinosaur clades during the Cretaceous does not correlate with angiosperm diversity increases. However, later studies still suggest the possibility that the KTR caused a rise in dinosaur diversity. Dinosaurs contributed little to angiosperm diversification, which was instead mainly driven by coevolution with other animals, such as insects and herbivorous mammals. It has been suggested that some pterosaurs may have been seed dispersers symbiotically linked to angiosperms. A comprehensive molecular study of evolution of mammals at the taxonomic level of family also showed important diversification during the KTR. Mammals diversified extensively during the KTR, but also decreased in disparity.

Insect diversity overall appears to have been minimally affected by the KTR, as molecular evidence shows that the increase in diversity of pollinating insects was asynchronous with the KTR. Spikes in both insect origination and extinction rates during the KTR were correlated with high global temperatures. However, Early Cretaceous angiosperms were short in stature and would have been heavily reliant on insect pollination, and fossil remains of early angiosperms suggest such a dependence on zoophilous pollination. There is also evidence suggesting that terrestrial arthropods may have preferentially preyed on angiosperms. Genetic evidence indicates a major radiation of phasmatodeans occurred during the KTR, likely in response to a coeval radiation of enantiornitheans and other visual predators. Ants likewise underwent massive increase in diversity as part of the KTR. Similarly, bee pollinator diversification strongly correlates with angiosperm flower appearance and specialization during the same era. Flies, already successful pollinators before the rise of angiosperms, quickly adapted to the new hosts. Beetles became pollinators of angiosperms by the earliest part of the Late Cretaceous. Lepidopterans radiated during the KTR, though the angiosperm radiation is insufficient in and of itself to completely account for their diversification. Among one lineage of sawflies, there was a change in preferred host plants amidst the biotic reorganisation of the KTR. Not all insects were advantaged by this diversification and rearrangement of ecosystems; long-proboscid insects that were mainstays of gymnosperm-dominated ecosystems earlier in the Mesozoic underwent a major decline. Late-surviving eoblattodeans evolved long, slim bodies with long external ovipositors in response to the angiosperm radiation, but this proved to be an evolutionary dead end in the long run and the group went extinct. The so-called "golden age" of neuropterans during the Middle Mesozoic, when gymnosperms dominated the flora, ended with the KTR and its reshaping of the terrestrial environment. Mesoraphidiids went extinct during the KTR, likely due to the habitat preference of their larvae of gymnosperms, although alloraphidiine mesoraphidiids increased in disparity in the Late Cretaceous in response to the KTR.

The KTR may have supercharged the contemporary Mesozoic Marine Revolution (MMR) by enhancing weathering and erosion, accelerating the flow of limiting nutrients into the world's oceans.

For nearly the entirety of Earth's history, including most of the Phanerozoic eon, marine species diversity exceeded terrestrial species diversity, a pattern which was reversed during the Middle Cretaceous as a result of the KTR in what has been termed a biological "great divergence", named after the historical Great Divergence.

== See also ==
- Cretaceous–Paleogene boundary (K–T boundary)
- Cretaceous–Paleogene extinction event
