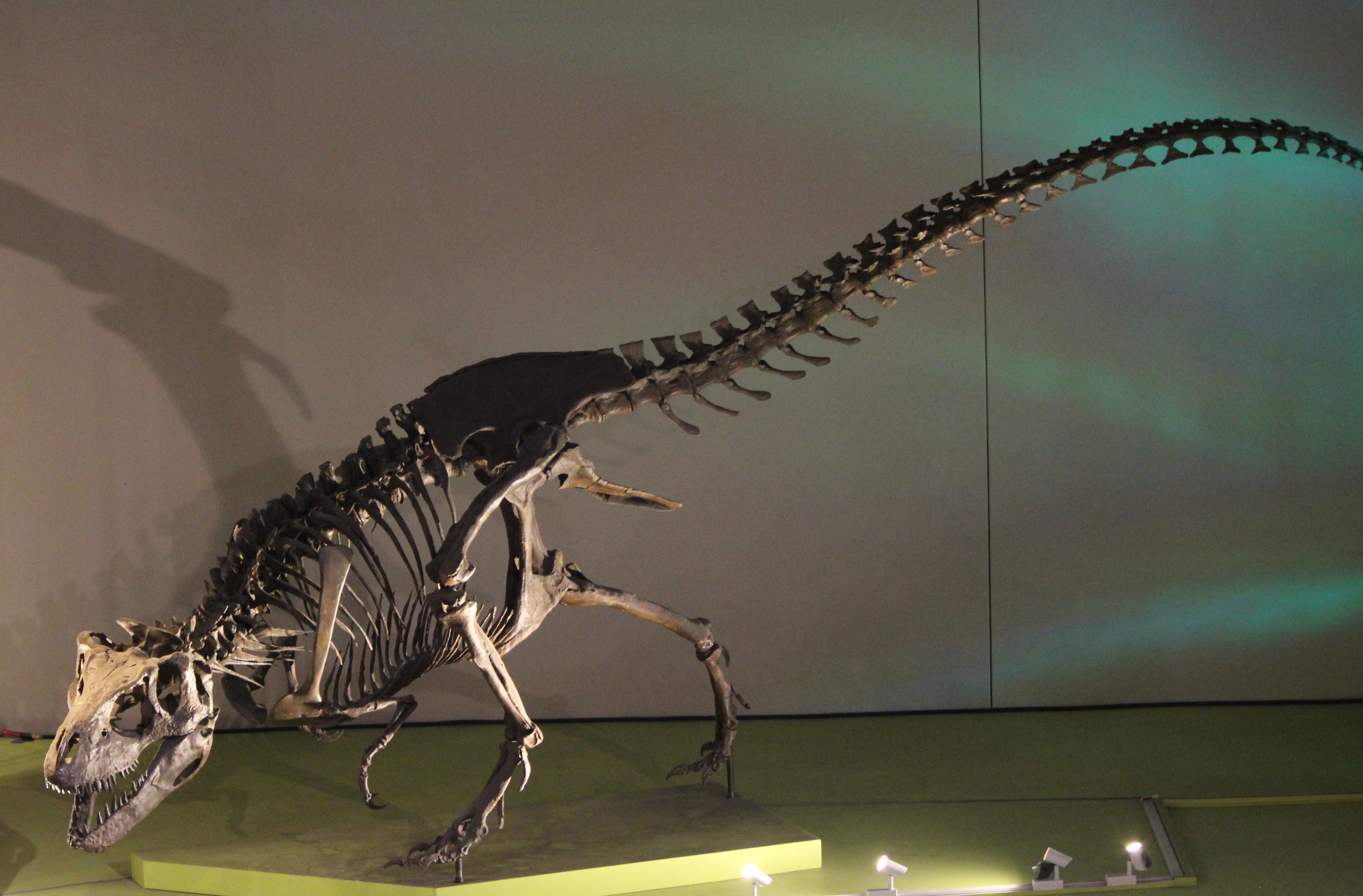
- Reconstructed skeleton, Perot Museum

Scientific classification
- Kingdom: Animalia
- Phylum: Chordata
- Class: Reptilia
- Clade: Dinosauria
- Clade: Saurischia
- Clade: Theropoda
- Superfamily: †Tyrannosauroidea
- Family: †Tyrannosauridae
- Subfamily: †Tyrannosaurinae
- Genus: †Nanuqsaurus; Fiorillo & Tykoski, 2014

Type species
- †Nanuqsaurus hoglundi Fiorillo & Tykoski, 2014

= Nanuqsaurus =

Nanuqsaurus Temporal range: Late Cretaceous, 73 Ma

Extinct genus of dinosaurs

Nanuqsaurus (meaning "polar bear lizard") is a genus of tyrannosaurine theropod dinosaur known from the Late Cretaceous (latest Campanian age) Prince Creek Formation of the North Slope of Alaska. It contains a single species, Nanuqsaurus hoglundi, known from a partial skull and multiple undescribed postcranial and teeth elements.

== Discovery and naming ==
=== Initial material ===
Before the formal description of Nanuqsaurus, numerous tyrannosaurid teeth were known from the Kogosukruk Tongue of the Prince Creek Formation and were first referred to the genus Gorgosaurus. Later, after the locale was understood to be younger than previously thought, the consensus switched to referring to the teeth under the genus Albertosaurus.

=== Holotype specimen ===
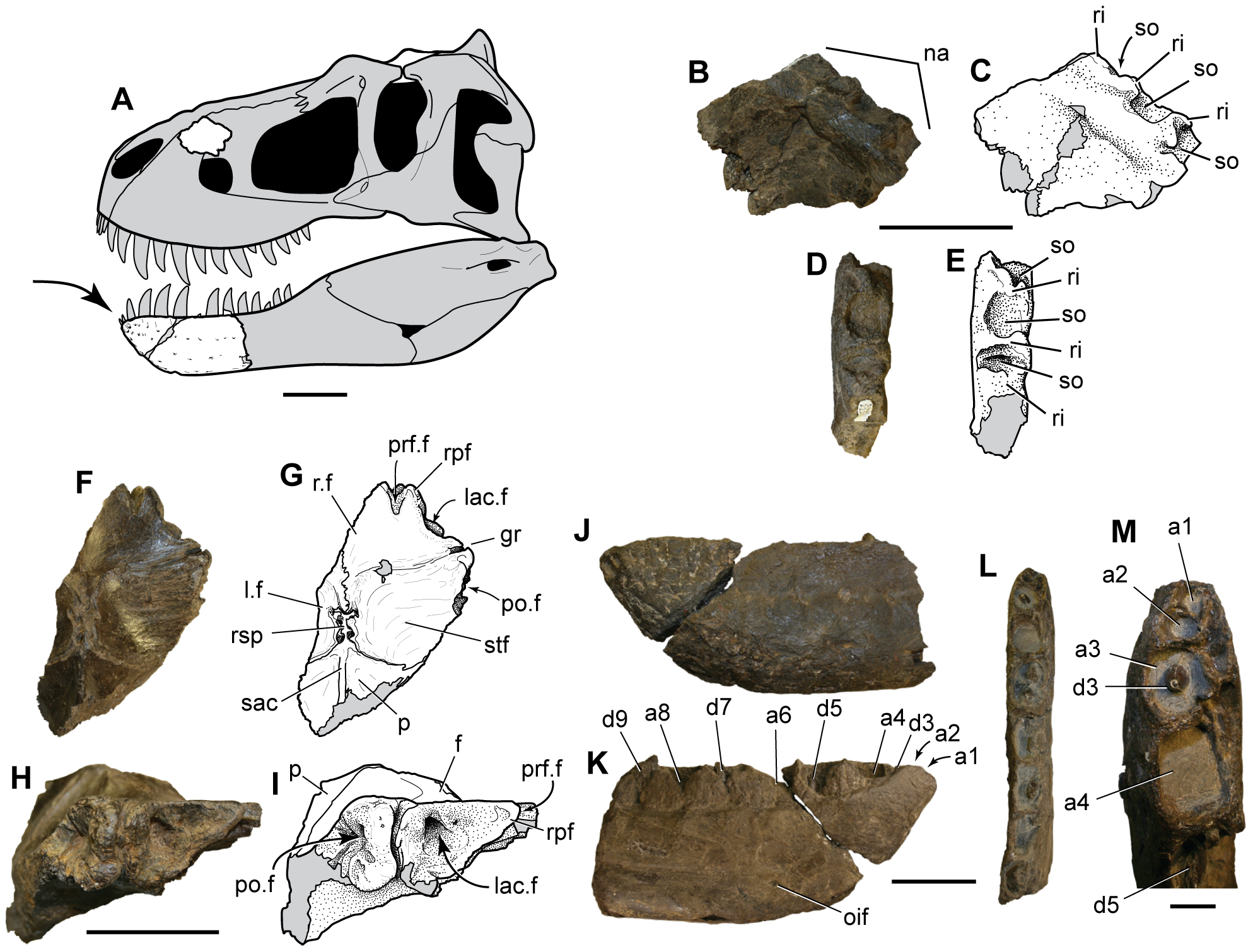
Holotype fossils as presented in the animal's initial description

In 2006, within the North Slope Borough of Alaska, the fossilized remains of a medium-sized theropod were located at the Kikak-Tegoseak Quarry of the Prince Creek Formation. The material was found to contain multiple fragments of the animal's skull, all of which were collected from the same quarry and found to most likely belong to a single individual. Among the disarticulated fragments preserved were the nasal branch of the right maxilla, a fragmentary skull roof including pieces of both frontals, parietals, a piece of the right laterosphenoid, and a fragment of the left dentary. These anatomical features were later used to estimate the skull length of the animal, with estimates giving it a length of 600–700 mm (24–28 in). Recent revisions to radiometric dating now suggest a latest Campanian age.

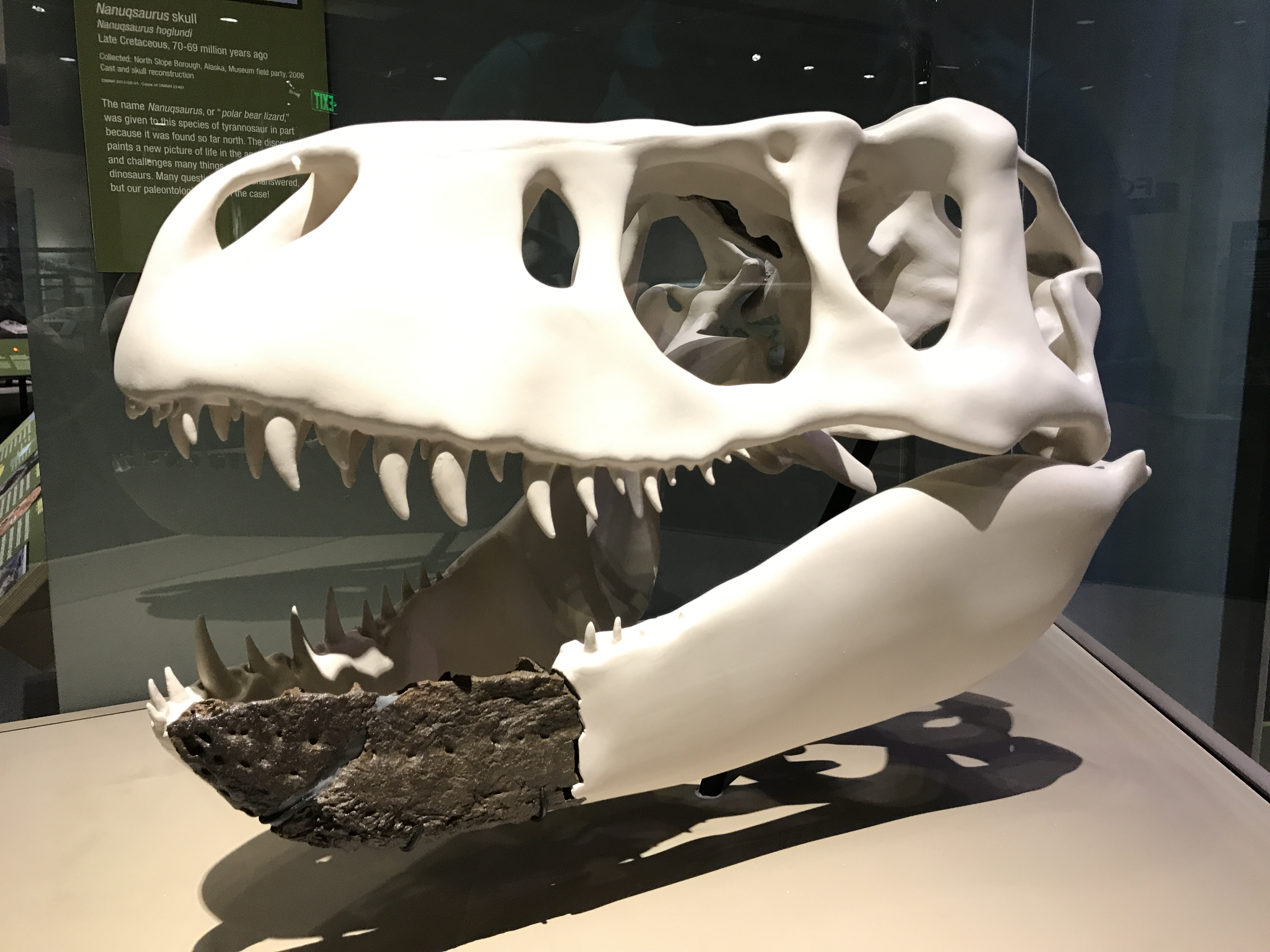
Reconstructed skull with cast of the holotype in place, Perot Museum

It wasn't until after preparation and analysis at the Perot Museum of Nature and Science (Dallas Museum of Natural History) when the Alaskan Tyrannosaurid remains were finally recognized to represent a new taxon as opposed to being synonymous with previous genera. This prompted the creation of a new genus, Nanuqsaurus, described and named by Anthony R. Fiorillo and Ronald S. Tykoski in 2014. The initially discovered material, referred to as DMNH 21461, is now recognized as the holotype of Nanuqsaurus. As well as this, the initial discoveries of teeth were placed as more likely to be the remains of Nanuqsaurus as opposed to any other known creature, contrary to the initial proposals of the origin of the teeth.

=== Etymology ===
The type species, Nanuqsaurus hoglundi, has its generic name derived from the Iñupiaq word for 'polar bear', nanuq, and the Greek word sauros, meaning 'lizard'. The specific name honors the philanthropist Forrest Hoglund for his work on philanthropy and cultural institutions.

== Description ==
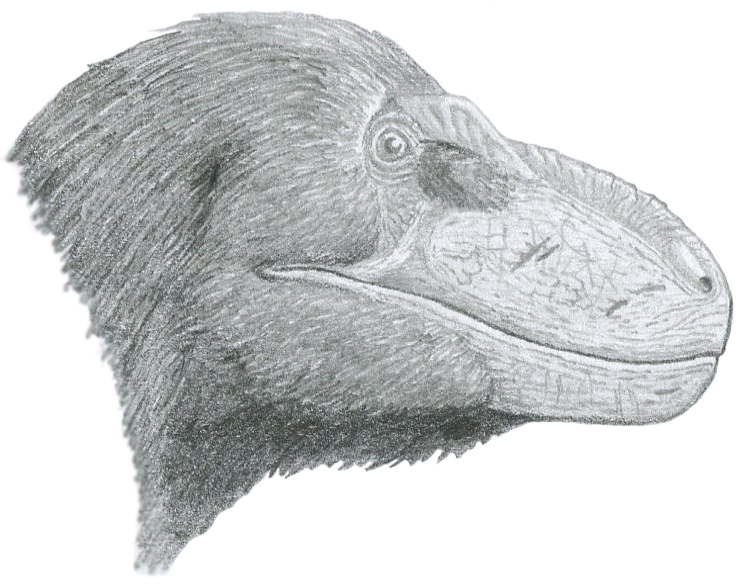
Restoration of the animal's head in life

Initially, Nanuqsaurus was estimated to have been about 5–6 meters (16–20 ft) long, a metric based on the holotype specimen, putting the animal at about half the length of Tyrannosaurus rex. The length of the same specimen's reconstructed skull, based on the proportions of related animals, was 60–70 cm (24–28 in). Its weight was also estimated to be 500–900 kg (1,100–2,000 lb). This diminutive size was postulated by Fiorillo and Tykoski as being an adaptation to its high-latitude habitat. However, later studies tied 13 additional fossil elements across a 20 km stretch of the Colville River to a single theropod taxon. Further, that more recent work suggested that its supposed small size was unfounded and that it was likely similar in size to other North American tyrannosaurids, such as Albertosaurus which grew up to 8–9 meters (26–30 feet) long, based on undescribed adult-sized teeth and postcranial elements. Some of the undescribed postcranial elements scale to around 7 meters (23 feet) in length, described comparable to a juvenile Tarbosaurus. It is estimated that the adult Nanuqsaurus specimens would have weighed over 1.9 metric tons (2.1 short tons) based on these recently collected fossils. It was likely covered in feathers for insulation against the cold.

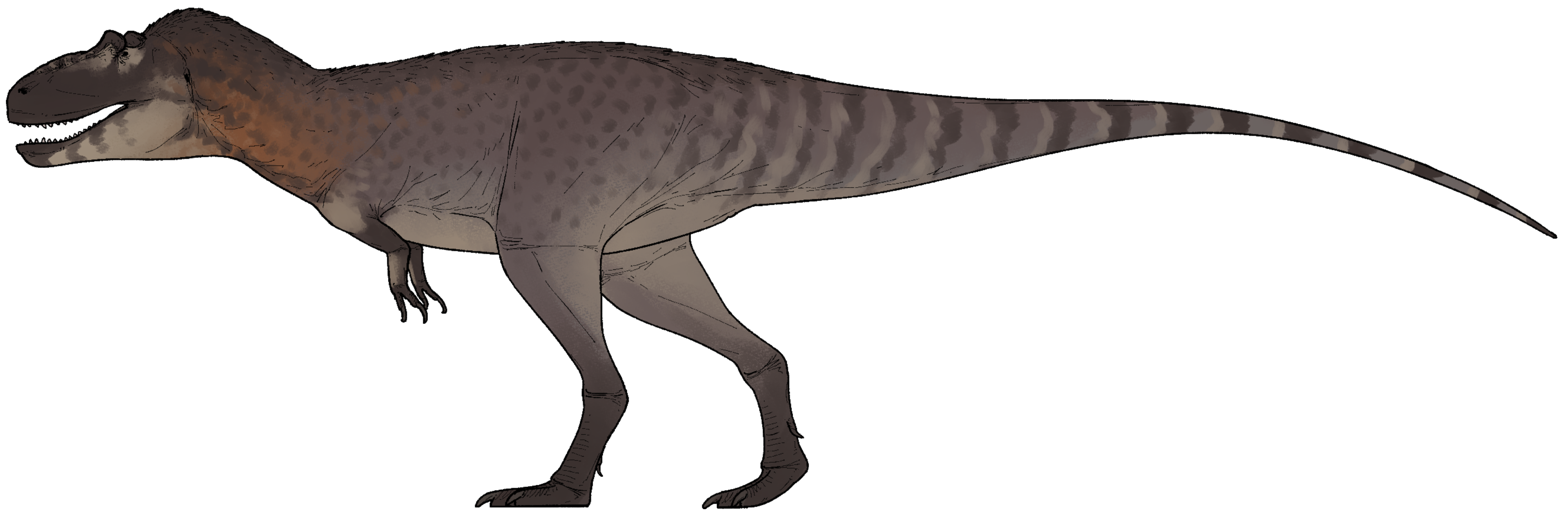
Speculative life restoration of N. hoglundi

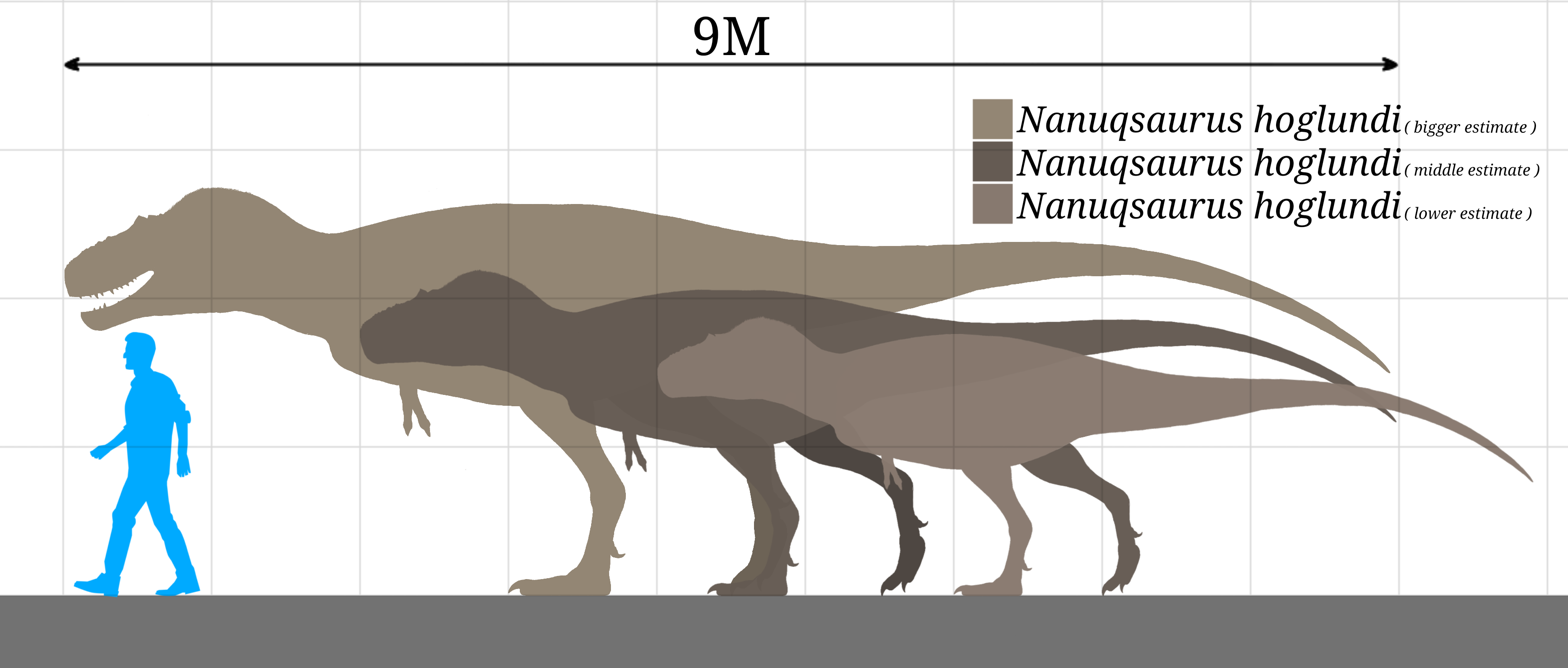
Size comparison of several proposed adult body lengths of Nanuqsaurus

Nanuqsaurus would have likely resembled other large tyrannosaurines, such as Daspletosaurus, with both animals being closely related and probably serving similar roles in their respective ecosystems. Nanuqsaurus itself is anatomically diagnosed by the following traits:

- A thin, rostrally forked, median spur of the fused parietals on the dorsal skull roof that overlaps and separates the frontals within the sagittal crest.
- Frontals with a long, rostrally pointed process separating the prefrontal and lacrimal facets.
- The first two dentary teeth are much smaller than the dentary teeth behind them.

However, further studies have indicated that these anatomical traits may not be diagnostic. A rostral process separating the prefrontal and lacrimal facets is present in Teratophoneus (and potentially Lythronax). The first two dentary teeth being smaller than those behind is variably present throughout Tyrannosauridae and the actual presence of the rostral parietal spur is debatable.

== Classification ==
Phylogenetic analysis of Tyrannosauridae finds Nanuqsaurus to be a close relative of Daspletosaurus and Tyrannosaurus within Tyrannosaurinae. Below is a cladogram illustrating the relationships of the Tyrannosauridae:

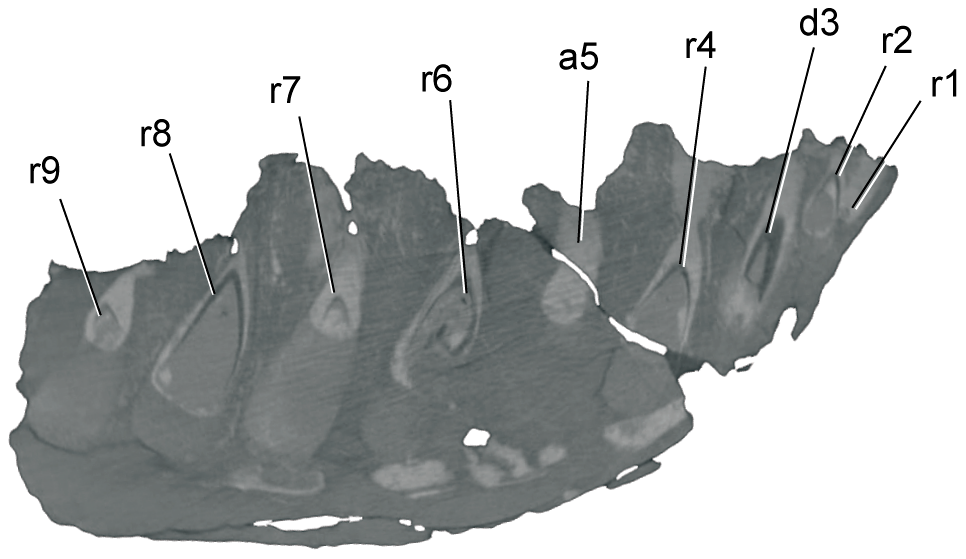
CT slice through the partial left dentary bone of the holotype, showing the replacement teeth present in the jaw bone

- Tyrannosauridae
  - - Albertosaurinae
      - Gorgosaurus libratus
      - Albertosaurus sarcophagus
    - Tyrannosaurinae
      - Alioramini
        - Qianzhousaurus sinensis
        - - Alioramus remotus
          - Alioramus altai
      - - - Teratophoneus curriei
          - Dynamoterror dynastes
          - Lythronax argestes
        - - Nanuqsaurus hoglundi
          - - - Daspletosaurini
                - Thanatotheristes degrootorum
                - - Daspletosaurus torosus
                  - Daspletosaurus horneri
              - - Zhuchengtyrannus magnus
                - - Tarbosaurus bataar
                  - Tyrannosaurus rex

A 2023 thesis argued that its taxonomic validity and phylogenetic position is poorly resolved, and that the taxon is a nomen dubium. A 2024 study recovered Asiatyrannus from the Nanxiong Formation of South China to be in a polytomy with the North American Nanuqsaurus. These results are displayed in the cladogram below:

- Tyrannosauridae
  - - Albertosaurus
    - Gorgosaurus
  - Tyrannosaurinae
    - Nanotyrannus
    - - Alioramus spp.
      - Qianzhousaurus
    - - Lythronax
      - Teratophoneus
      - - Asiatyrannus
        - Nanuqsaurus
        - - Daspletosaurus spp.
          - - Zhuchengtyrannus
            - - Tarbosaurus
              - Tyrannosaurus

== Paleobiology ==
=== Reproduction at polar latitudes ===
Analysis of material attributed to Nanuqsaurus and other Alaskan dinosaurs from the same environment has resulted in the Prince Creek Formation being recognized as having preserved an exceptionally high percentage of developmentally young dinosaurs when compared to the amount of families represented in the formation. Material from young dinosaur specimens, including birds, has been determined to be present from seven different major clades, or 70% of all the recognized families of the quarry. The families in question are Hadrosauridae, Thescelosauridae, Leptoceratopsidae, Ceratopsidae, Tyrannosauridae, Dromaeosauridae, Troodontidae, and Avialae. This evidence suggests that both Nanuqsaurus and its likely prey items remained in the paleo-Arctic yearlong and would have had to cope with ~120 days of constant winter darkness each year, as opposed to resorting to migration to escape the harsh conditions. It is proposed that the animals would likely have laid their eggs toward the beginning of the constant daylight period, around the month of April, allowing time for the eggs to incubate in the relative heat of this part of the year.

== Paleoecology ==
Nanuqsaurus lived alongside many other dinosaurs during what is referred to as the Edmontonian faunal stage of the latest Campanian. As the largest carnivore in its area it was most likely an apex predator. Having resided at an estimated 80°–85°N paleolatitude, isotopic analysis of oxygen-18 ratios in tooth enamel indicate cool mean annual temperatures near or just above 0 °C (32 °F).

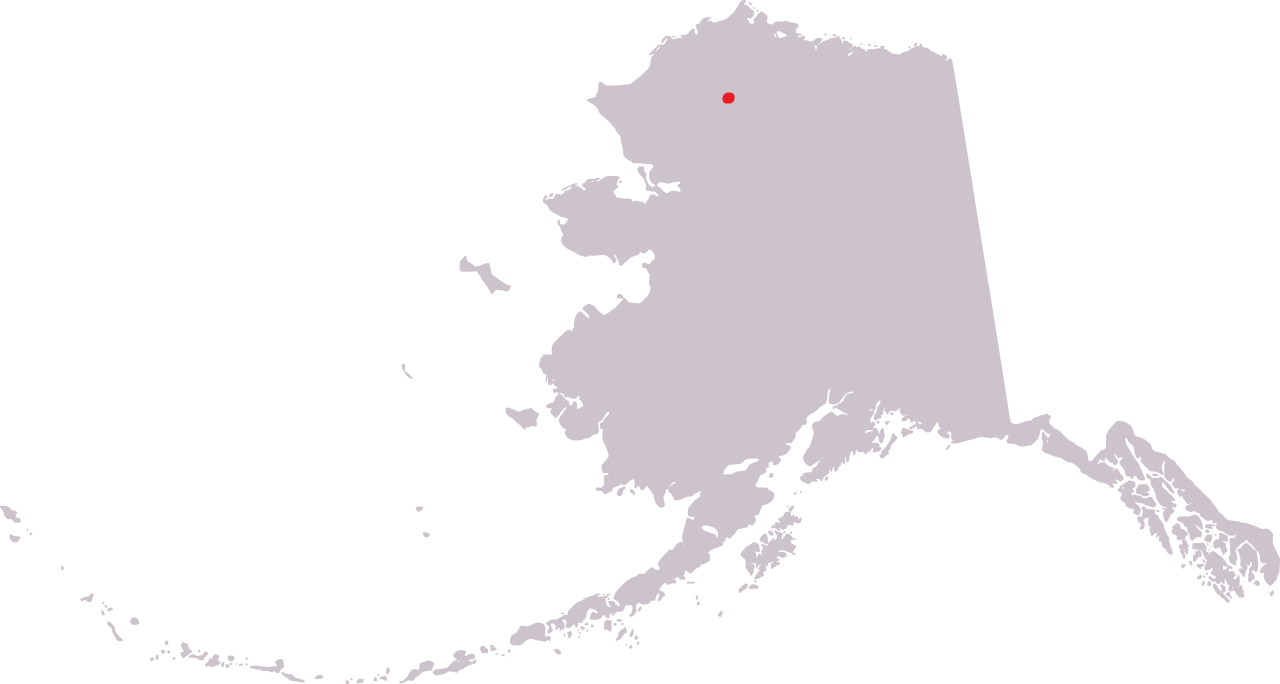
Distribution of Nanuqsaurus, shown in red

Other animals that lived alongside Nanuqsaurus include an unnamed leptoceratopsid, the hadrosaurid Edmontosaurus (similar to E. regalis), an unnamed lambeosaurine, an unnamed thescelosaurine (mentioned to be similar to Parkosaurus and Thescelosaurus), an unnamed orodromine (mentioned to be similar to Orodromeus), the ceratopsid Pachyrhinosaurus perotorum, the pachycephalosaurid Alaskacephale, a large troodontid assigned to the dubious genus Troodon, the dromaeosaurids Dromaeosaurus and Saurornitholestes, along with an unnamed saurornitholestine, an unnamed ornithomimosaur, and multiple avialans. As well as this, several mammals, including the metatherian Unnuakomys, the eutherian Gypsonictops, both an unnamed and named multituberculate, the latter being Cimolodon, and an indeterminate marsupial. Due to the cooler conditions of this habitat, many otherwise common ectothermic clades lack representation entirely in the Prince Creek Formation, suggesting that all the animals that lived in these extreme latitudes were endotherms to some degree.

== See also ==
- Timeline of tyrannosaur research
