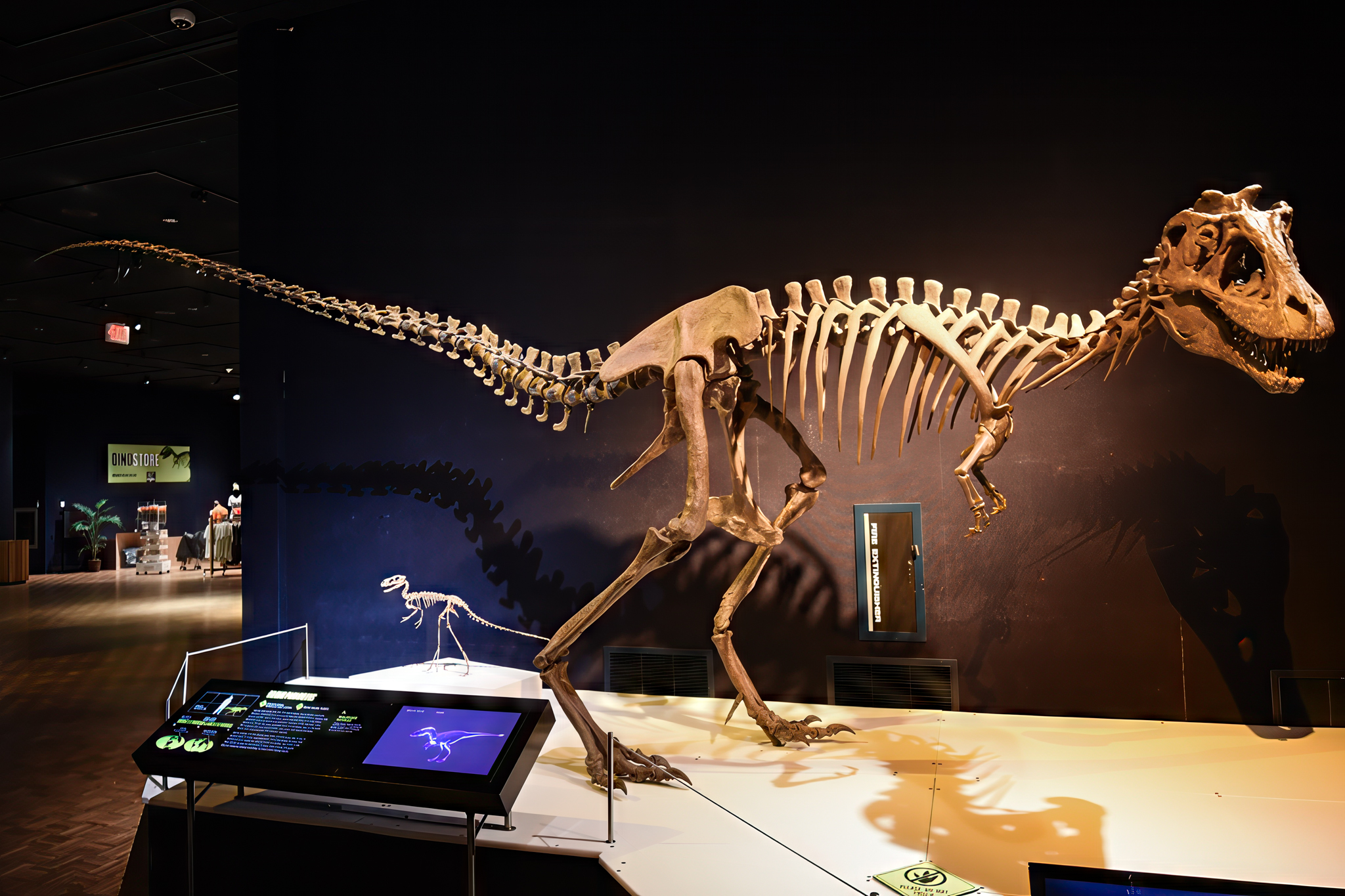
- Reconstructed skeleton, Milwaukee Public Museum

Scientific classification
- Kingdom: Animalia
- Phylum: Chordata
- Clade: Dinosauria
- Clade: Saurischia
- Clade: Theropoda
- Superfamily: †Tyrannosauroidea
- Family: †Tyrannosauridae
- Subfamily: †Tyrannosaurinae
- Tribe: †Teratophoneini
- Genus: †Lythronax; Loewen et al., 2013

Type species
- †Lythronax argestes Loewen et al., 2013

= Lythronax =

Lythronax Temporal range: Late Cretaceous, 81.9–81.5 Ma

Genus of tyrannosaurid dinosaur from the Late Cretaceous period

Lythronax (LYE-thro-nax) is a genus of tyrannosaurid dinosaur that lived in North America around 81.9-81.5 million years ago during the Late Cretaceous period. The only known specimen was discovered in Utah in the Wahweap Formation of the Grand Staircase–Escalante National Monument in 2009, and it consists of a partial skull and skeleton. In 2013, it became the basis of the new genus and species Lythronax argestes; the generic name Lythronax means "gore king", and the specific name argestes originates from the Greek poet Homer's name for the wind from the southwest, in reference to the specimen's geographic provenance in North America.

Size estimates for Lythronax have ranged between 5 and 8 m (16 and 26 ft) in length, and between 0.5 and 2.5 t (1,100 and 5,500 lb) in weight. It was a heavily built tyrannosaurid, and as a member of that group, it would have had small, two-fingered forelimbs, strong hindlimbs, and a very robust skull. The rear part of the skull of Lythronax appears to have been very broad, with eye sockets that faced forwards to a similar degree as seen in Tyrannosaurus. Lythronax had 11 tooth sockets in the maxilla bone of the upper jaw; most tyrannosaurids had more. The frontmost teeth were the largest, the longest being almost 13 cm (5 in) long. Other details of the skull and skeleton which distinguished Lythronax from other tyrannosaurids included the s-shaped outer margin of the maxilla and a process of the astragalus of the ankle, a projection that expanded further upwards compared to its relatives.

The holotype was found in the Reynolds Point Member of the Wahweap Formation, which dates to the Campanian stage of the Cretaceous. Lythronax is thus the oldest known member of the family Tyrannosauridae, and it is thought to have been more basal than Tyrannosaurus. Due to its age, Lythronax is important for understanding the evolutionary origins of tyrannosaurids, including the development of their anatomical specializations. The forward-facing eyes of Lythronax gave it depth perception, which may have been useful during pursuit or ambush predation.

== Discovery and naming ==
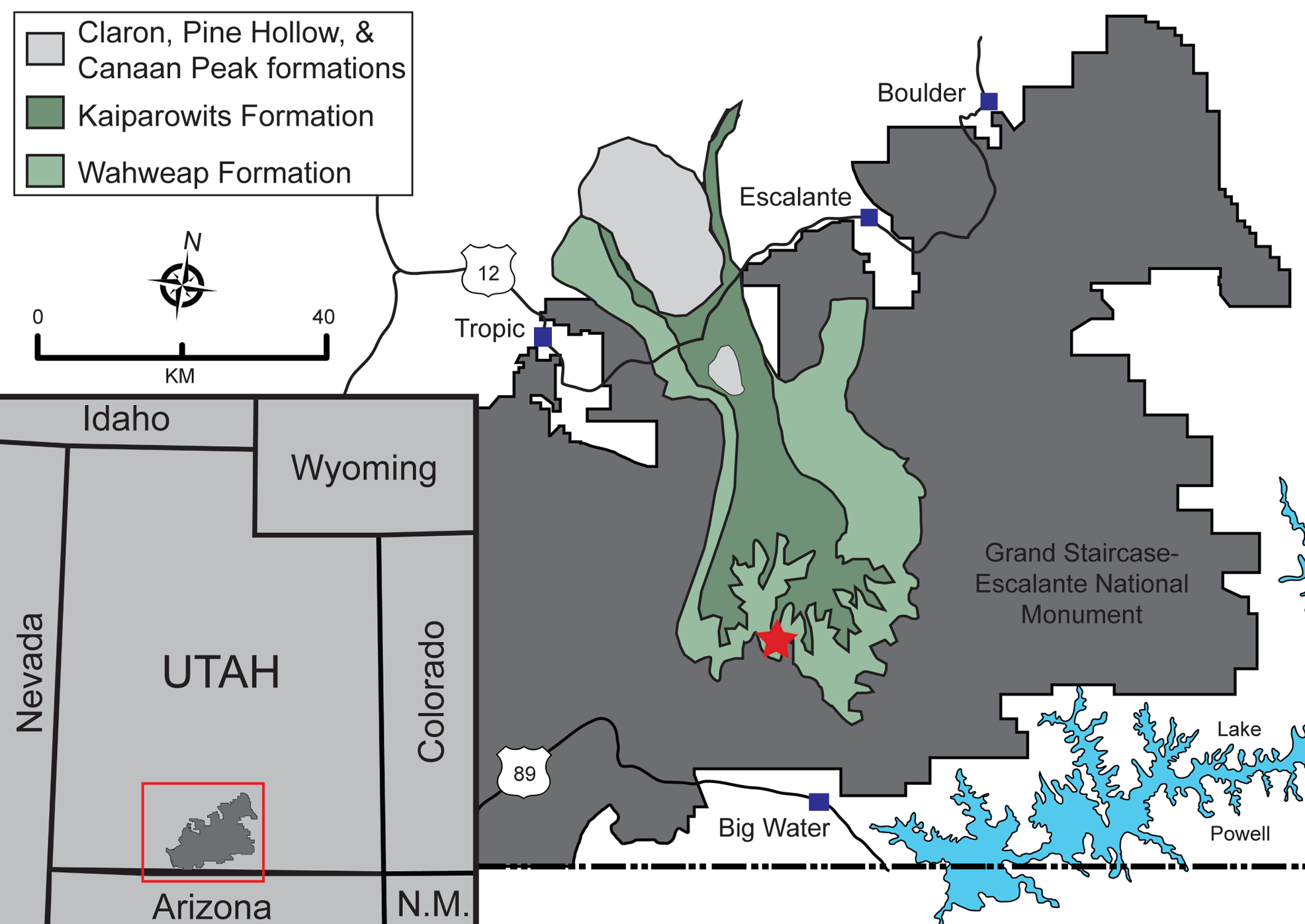
Map showing the Nipple Butte area (★) of Grand Staircase–Escalante National Monument, where Lythronax was found in the Wahweap Formation

In 2009, Scott Richardson of the U.S. Bureau of Land Management (BLM) was searching for fossils with a co-worker in the Wahweap Formation of the Grand Staircase–Escalante National Monument, southern Utah, when they came across a leg and nasal bone of a theropod dinosaur in the Nipple Butte area. Richardson contacted a team of paleontologists at the University of Utah, who were excited but initially skeptical, since theropod fossils had not been discovered in the area before. They were sent a photo of the nasal bone from which they identified it as belonging to a tyrannosaur, which was likely a new species because it came from an age with no known members of that group. The fossil remains were carefully excavated over a year by a joint team from the BLM and the Natural History Museum of Utah (UMNH). The locality, which is public land, was designated as UMNH VP 1501. Prior to the dinosaur's formal description, it had been referred to as the "Nipple Butte Tyrannosaur" or "Wahweap tyrannosaurid".

The specimen, UMNH VP 20200 (with the prefix denoting its storage in the UMNH), was made the holotype of the new genus and species Lythronax argestes by paleontologist Mark A. Loewen and colleagues in 2013. The generic name is derived from the Greek words lythron (λύθρον), meaning "gore", and anax (ἄναξ), meaning "king". The specific name argestes (ἀργεστής) is a Greek name used by the poet Homer for the wind from the southwest, in reference to where the specimen was found within North America. In full, the scientific name can be translated as "gore king (or "king of gore") from the southwest". Loewen stated that the suffix meaning "king" in the name of Lythronax was intended to allude to its later, similar relative Tyrannosaurus rex. The prefix meaning "gore" was chosen to exemplify "its presumed lifestyle as a predator with its head covered in the blood of a dead animal".

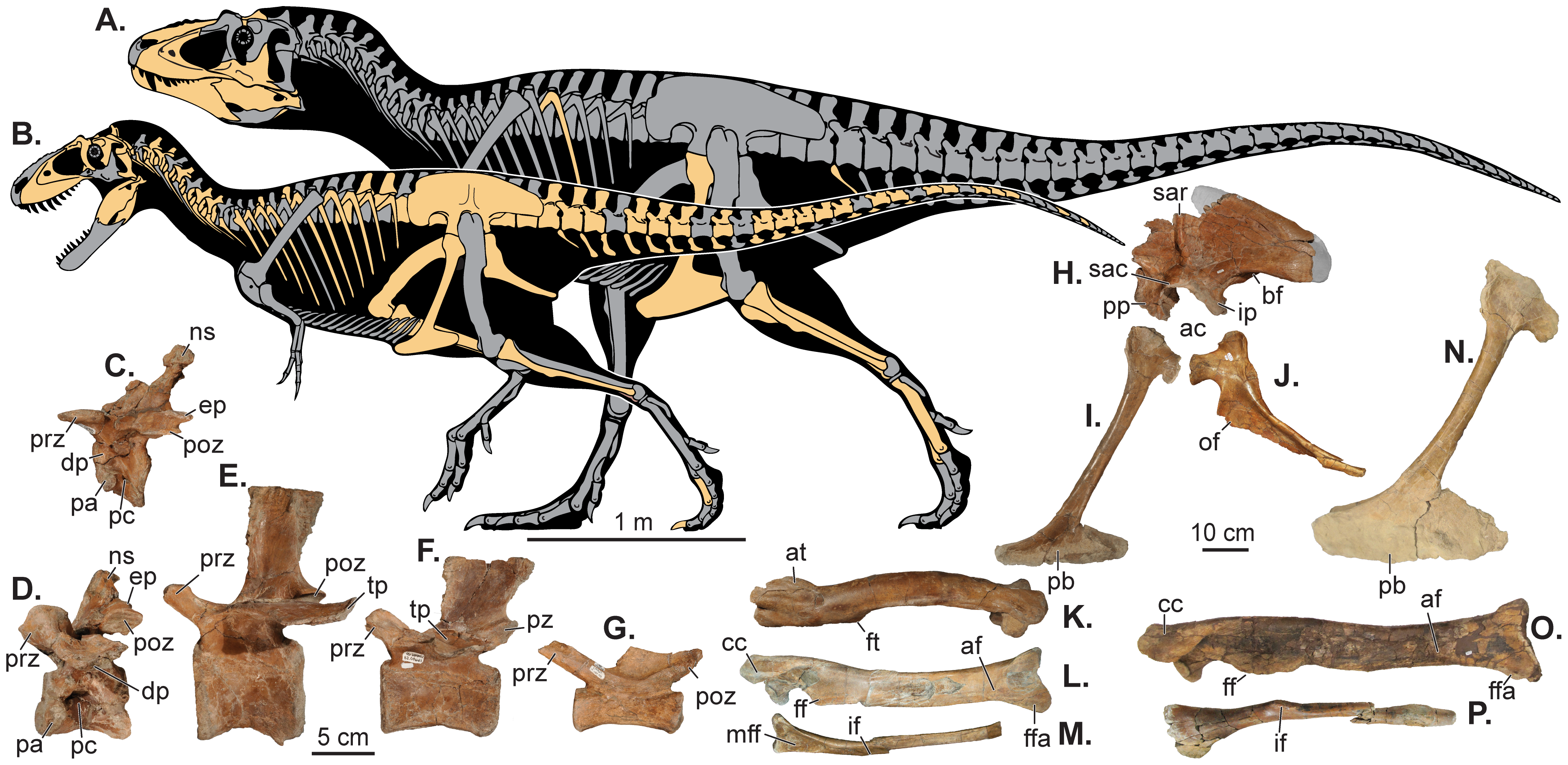
Skeletal diagrams showing holotype remains of Lythronax (A) and a Teratophoneus specimen (B). N–P show selected bones of the former

The holotype and single known specimen of Lythronax consists of a partial skull and skeleton, which includes the right maxilla, both nasals, the right frontal, the left jugal, the left quadrate, the right laterosphenoid, the right palatine, the left dentary, the left splenial, the left surangular, the left prearticular, a dorsal rib, a caudal chevron, both pubic bones, the left tibia and fibula, and left second and fourth metatarsals. In the paper that named Lythronax, the authors also described a new specimen of the geologically younger tyrannosaur Teratophoneus (which had been named in 2011); this genus is known from the Kaiparowits Formation of Grand Staircase–Escalante, and the two tyrannosaurs were used to investigate the evolutionary and geographical origins of the family Tyrannosauridae. Based on the paper's conclusions, the UMNH referred to Lythronax as a "great-uncle" of Tyrannosaurus on their website.

In 2017, the US government announced plans to shrink the Grand Staircase–Escalante (to little over half its size) and Bears Ears monuments to enable coal mining and other energy development on the land; this was the largest reduction of US national monuments in history. Lythronax itself was one of two dinosaurs from the former monument mentioned in the presidential proclamation, along with Diabloceratops. American paleontologist Scott D. Sampson (a co-describer of Lythronax), who had overseen much of the early research at the monument, expressed fear that such a move would threaten further discoveries. Media outlets stressed the importance of the area's fossil discoveries—including more than 25 new taxa—while some highlighted Lythronax as one of the significant finds. The US government was subsequently sued by a group of scientists, environmentalists, and Native Americans; in 2021, the monument was restored to its former extent by the subsequent administration.

== Description ==
Size compared to a human

At the time Lythronax was announced, news sites reported size estimates of about 7.3–8 m (24–26 ft) in length and around 2.5 t (5,500 lb) in weight, based on comparisons to the much larger relative Tyrannosaurus; Loewen stated that it may have grown even larger. American paleontologist Gregory S. Paul gave a lower estimate of 5 m (16 ft) in length and a weight of only 500 kg (1,100 lb) in 2016. Lythronax was a relatively robust tyrannosaurid. Like other members of the group, it would have possessed small, two-fingered forelimbs, large and strong hindlimbs, broad jaws, and a very robustly constructed skull. Although earlier small-bodied members of the superfamily Tyrannosauroidea possessed protofeathers, their presence could have varied between species or the age of an individual.

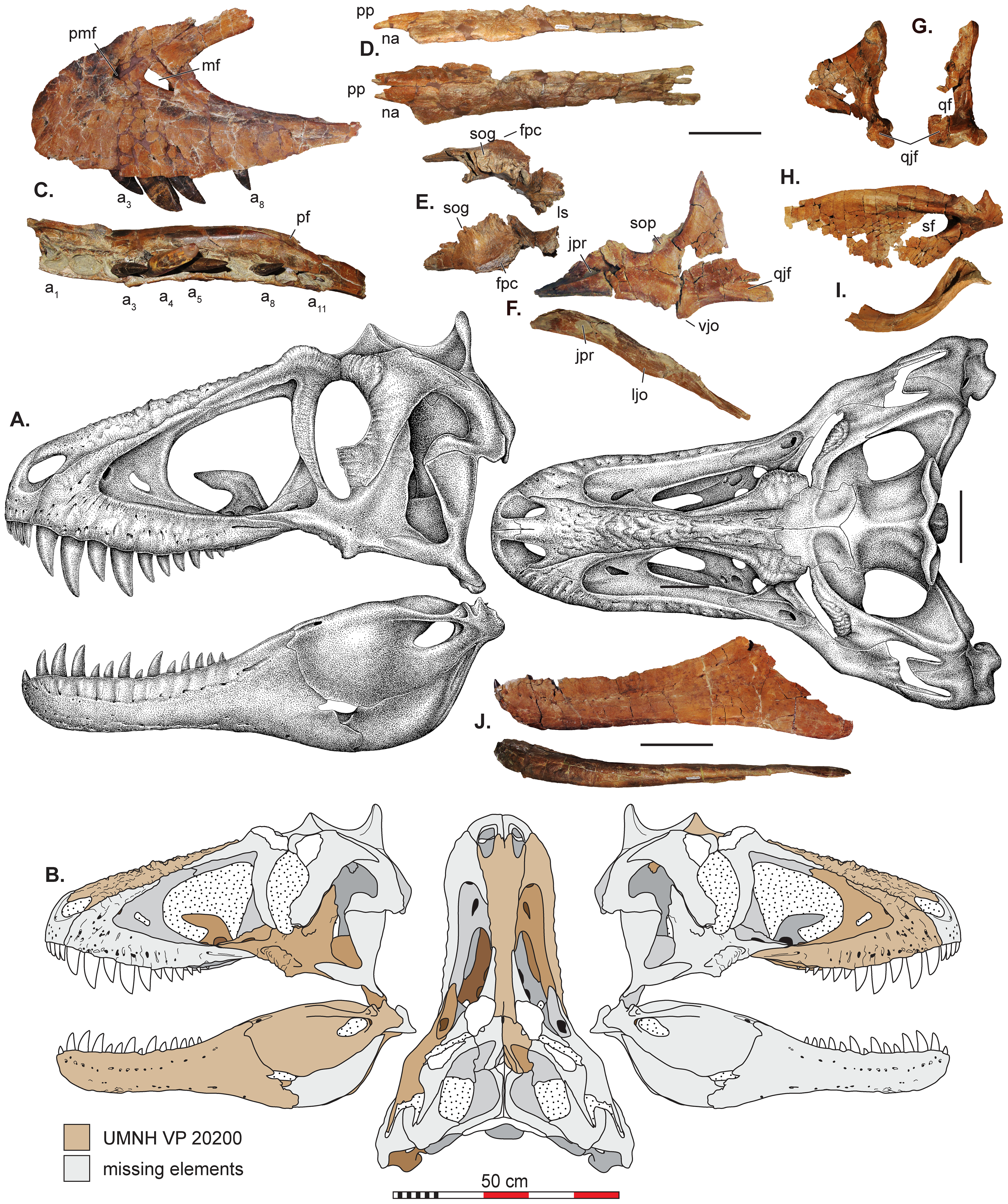
Skull reconstruction (A), known skull bones (B), and selected skull bones of the holotype (C–J)

Lythronax had a relatively short snout and a broad skull (width over 40% of the length), as in other tyrannosaurids. The nasal bones along the top of the snout were much wider at the front than the middle, unlike in other tyrannosaurids. Viewed from above, the outer margins of the skull (formed by the maxilla and jugal bones) were strongly sigmoid-shaped (or s-shaped). Along with the width of the frontal bone (a bone at the top of the skull), this appeared to have made the rear part of Lythronax's skull very broad, with orbits (eye sockets) that faced nearly forwards. These features are otherwise only known in Tarbosaurus and Tyrannosaurus; earlier-diverging tyrannosaurids had less forward-facing orbits, and the rears of their skulls were narrower.

Lythronax was also distinct in that the surfaces of the frontal bone that contacted the prefrontal and postorbital bones at its front and rear sides were separated by only a narrow groove. The maxillae of Lythronax were robust and strongly convex along their outer margins, as in all other known tyrannosaurids, but differed in their sigmoid-shaped margins. Lythronax had 11 alveoli (tooth sockets) in each maxilla, a trait shared with no tyrannosaurs other than Teratophoneus and Bistahieversor (other tyrannosaurs had 12 or more maxillary alveoli). The maxillary teeth were heterodont (differentiated), the first five being much larger than those following. Some of the frontmost teeth were almost 13 cm (5 in) long. The teeth were similar to bananas in shape, robust, and serrated. As in Tyrannosaurus, the shelf of the palate was well developed.

The jugal bone (or "cheek" bone) was robust, and had a broad postorbital process (which projected upwards from the jugal to contact the postorbital bone), unlike other tyrannosaurs except Bistahieversor, Tyrannosaurus and Tarbosaurus. The front border of the postorbital process had a strong process which indicates that Lythronax had a large subocular flange (a projection into the lower part of the orbit), dissimilar to the smaller ones of other tyrannosaurids. Each ramus of the dentary (half of the tooth-bearing portion of the lower jaw) was strongly concave towards the outer side (bowing inwards along the length of the skull). This mirrored the contours of the maxilla of the upper jaw, and the strong expansion of the rear skull; this was similar to Bistahieversor, Tyrannosaurus, and Tarbosaurus, but unlike other tyrannosauroids. The dentary was also deep at the rear end, indicating that the following part of the mandible was comparable to Tarbosaurus and Tyrannosaurus in depth, but not to other tyrannosaurids. Like other tyrannosaurids, the surangular bone behind the dentary had a deep and well-developed shelf just in front of where the jaw articulated with the skull, and Lythronax was similar to Tyrannosaurus in that this shelf had a concave upper surface.

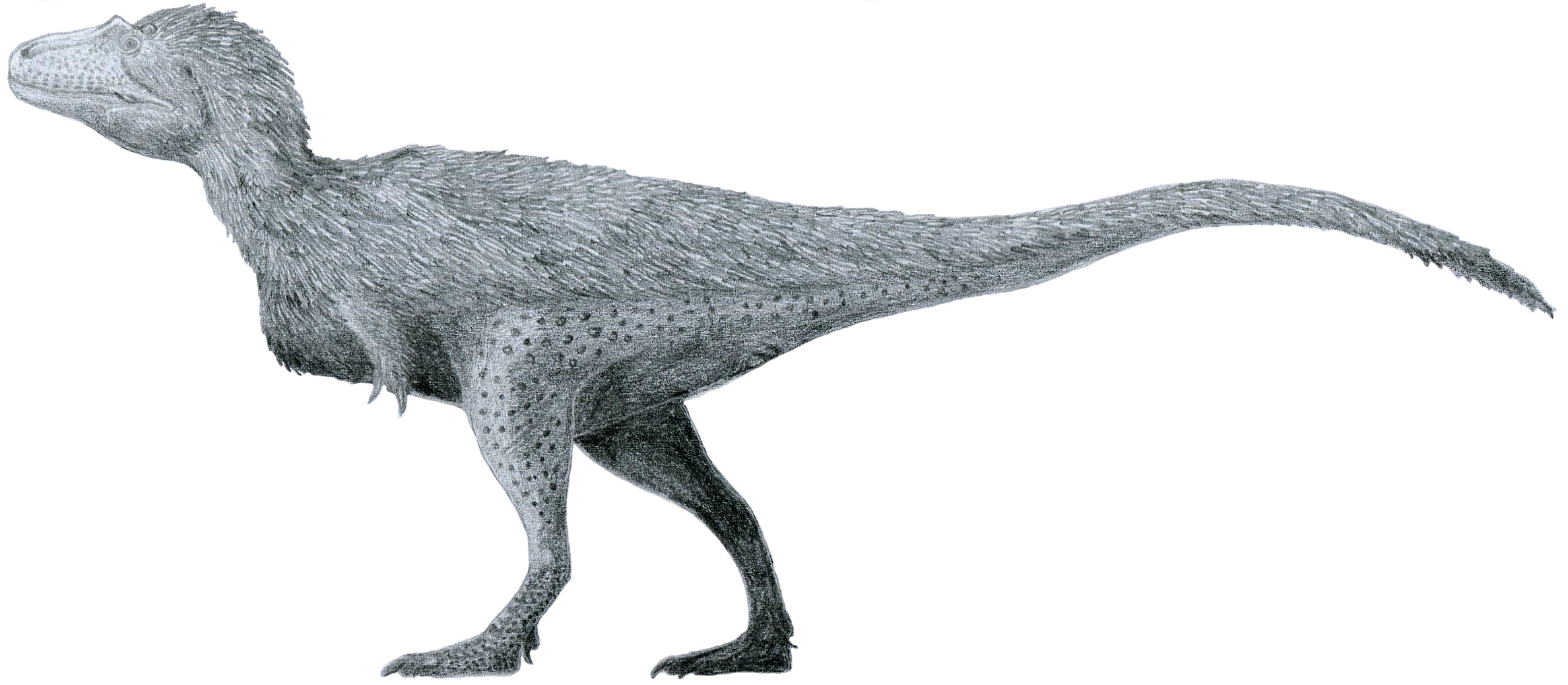
Life restoration showing hypothetical feathers

Though the postcranial skeleton of Lythronax is poorly known, the known remains of the pubis (part of the pelvis) and the hindlimb show features typical within Tyrannosauridae. The pubic boot, an expansion on the lower end of the pubis, had a large forward-directed process as in all tyrannosaurids. In Lythronax, the pubic boot was large and comparatively deep, most similar to those of Tarbosaurus and Tyrannosaurus, but dissimilar to the less expanded pubic boots of Teratophoneus, Albertosaurus, Gorgosaurus, and Daspletosaurus. The fibula, a bone of the lower leg, had a deep midline depression on its upper end, as in other tyrannosaurids. In Lythronax, the astragalus of the ankle had an ascending process above its articulation with the foot which was expanded further upwards compared to its relatives.

== Classification ==
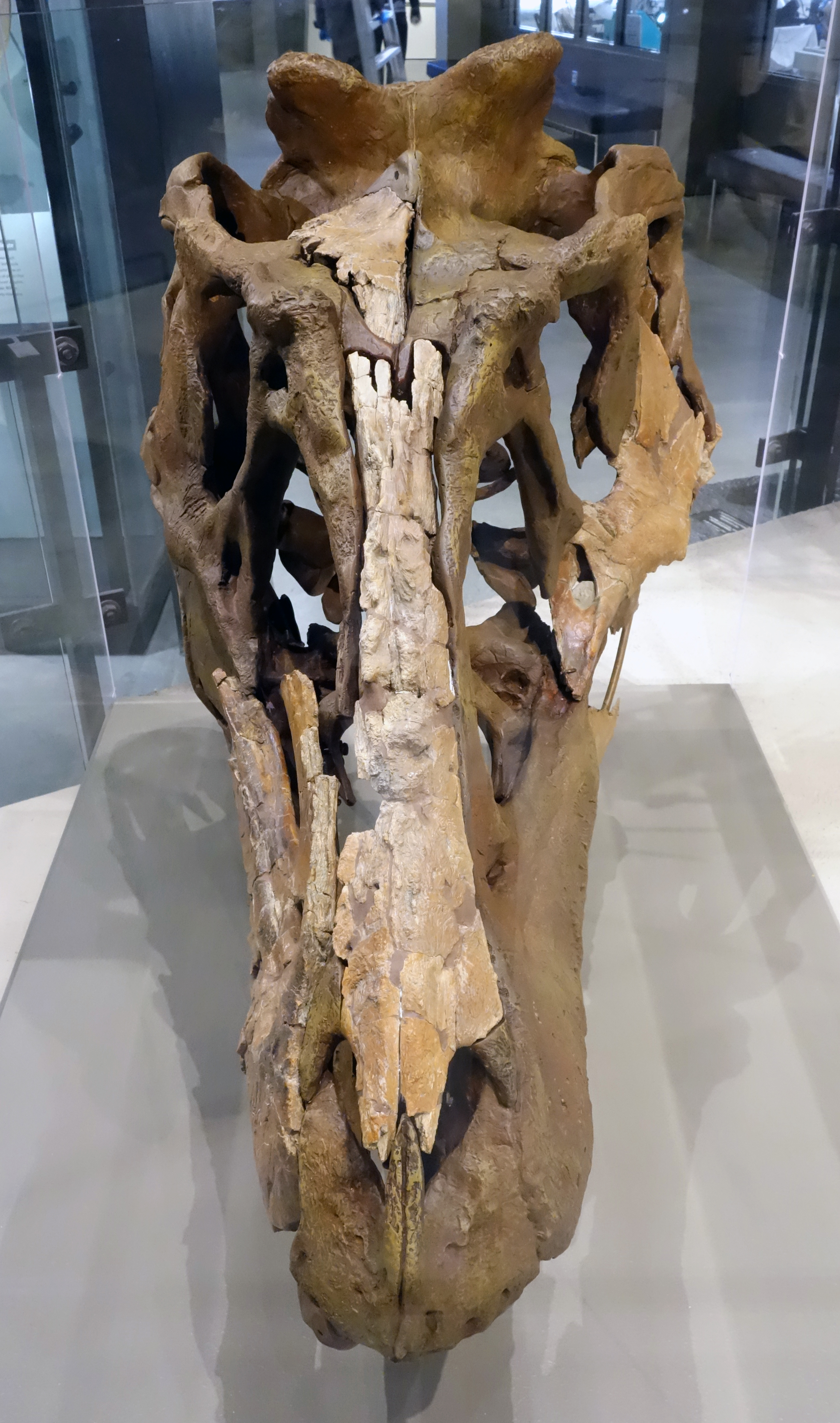
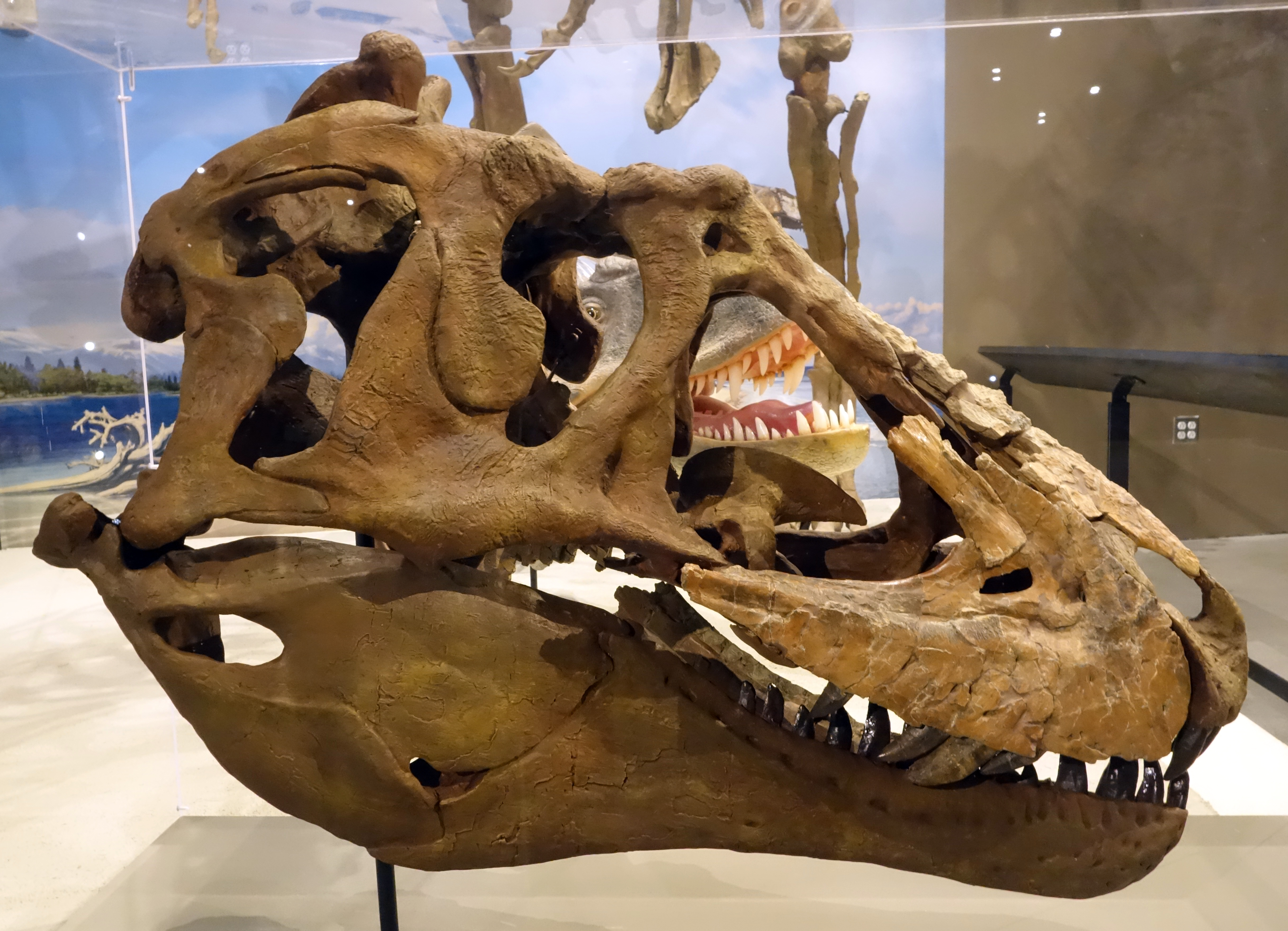
Reconstructed skull in front and right side views containing holotype bones (lighter brown), Natural History Museum of Utah

Lythronax belongs to the family Tyrannosauridae, a family of large-bodied coelurosaurs; most tyrannosaurid genera are known from North America and Asia. Based on its stratigraphic position, Lythronax is the oldest tyrannosaurid discovered so far. Prior to Lythronax being formally named, Zanno and colleagues noted in 2013 that the holotype specimen was likely distinct from Teratophoneus and Bistahieversor, both likewise from southern Utah. This would mean there were at least three tyrannosaurid genera present in the Western Interior Basin during the Campanian stage. A phylogenetic analysis conducted by Zanno and colleagues placed all three taxa within a single group of Tyrannosauridae to the exclusion of all other members of the group.

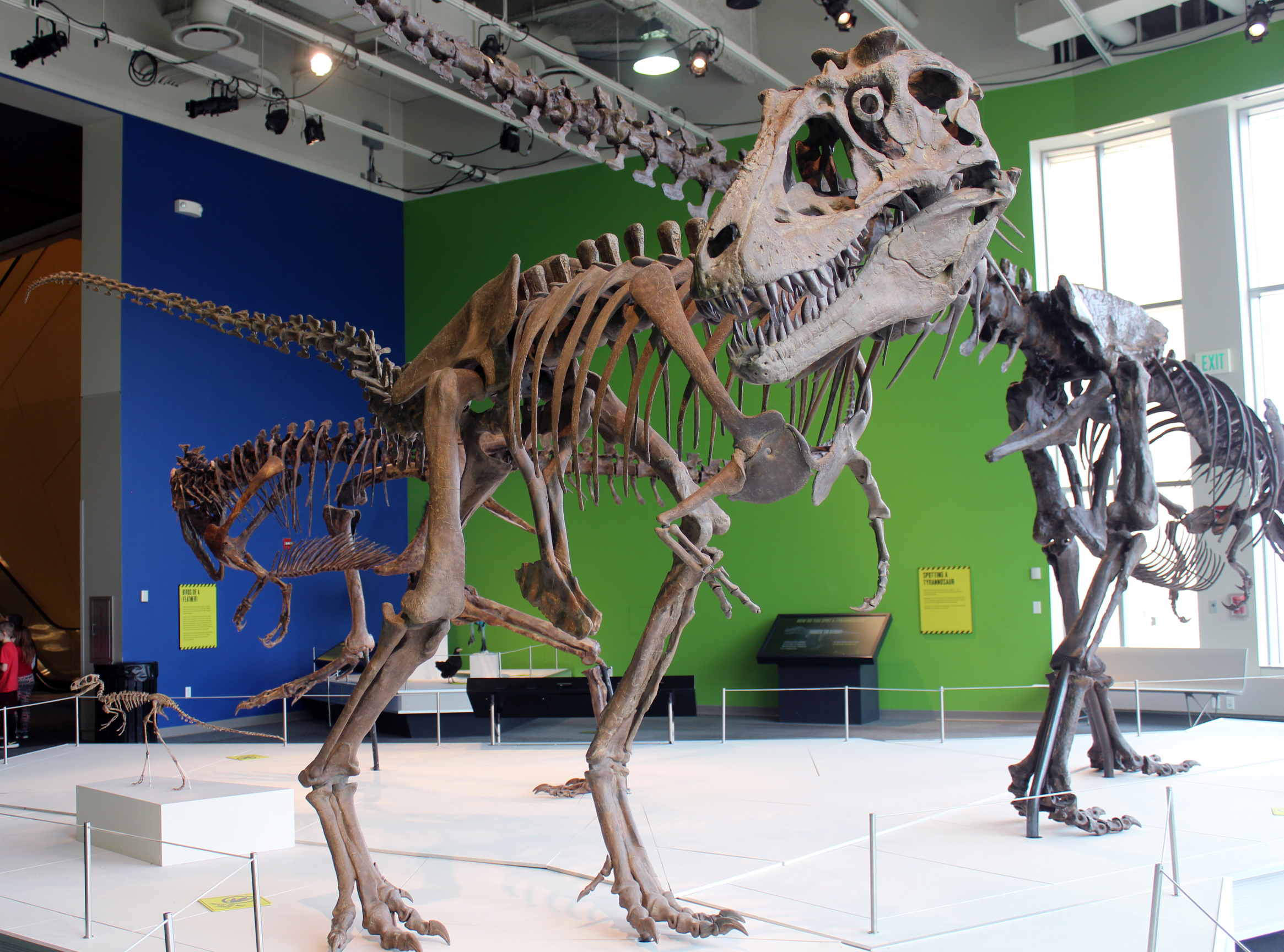
Reconstructed skeleton at Science Center of Iowa

A detailed phylogenetic analysis, conducted by Loewen and colleagues to accompany their 2013 description of Lythronax, based on 303 cranial and 198 postcranial features, placed it and Teratophoneus within the subfamily Tyrannosaurinae. Lythronax was a sister taxon of a group consisting of the Maastrichtian taxa Tarbosaurus and Tyrannosaurus and the late Campanian Zhuchengtyrannus. It was more closely related to this group than other taxa such as Daspletosaurus and Teratophoneus, which were younger than Lythronax but older than the group.

In 2017, American paleontologists Stephen Brusatte and Thomas D. Carr published a new phylogenetic analysis of Tyrannosauroidea, including a more comprehensive suite of anatomical characteristics and taxa, that disagreed with the results of Loewen and colleagues. While the tribe Alioramini was outside Tyrannosauridae in the analysis by Loewen and colleagues, Brusatte and Carr placed that group as the most basal (early-diverging or "primitive") group within Tyrannosaurinae. Conversely, Loewen and colleagues found Bistahieversor to be a derived ("advanced") tyrannosaurine closely related to the likewise derived Teratophoneus and Lythronax, while Brusatte and Carr placed it in a more basal position directly outside Tyrannosauridae, with both Teratophoneus and Lythronax as basal tyrannosaurines. It was suggested that both of these results stemmed from an over-weighting of some features by Loewen and colleagues, which resulted in the long-snouted alioramin forms being excluded from the short-snouted tyrannosaurines, and the placement of Bistahieversor and Lythronax closer to Tyrannosaurus than otherwise. The results of the two contrasting analyzes are shown in the cladograms below:

Topology 1: Loewen and colleagues, 2013

- Tyrannosauridae
  - Albertosaurinae
    - Gorgosaurus libratus
    - Albertosaurus sarcophagus
  - Tyrannosaurinae
    - Dinosaur Park tyrannosaurid
    - - Daspletosaurus torosus
      - - Daspletosaurus horneri
        - - Teratophoneus curriei
          - - Bistahieversor sealeyi
            - - Lythronax argestes
              - - Tyrannosaurus rex
                - - Zhuchengtyrannus magnus
                  - Tarbosaurus bataar

Topology 2: Brusatte and Carr, 2017

- Tyrannosauridae
  - Albertosaurinae
    - Gorgosaurus libratus
    - Albertosaurus sarcophagus
  - Tyrannosaurinae
    - - Alioramini
        - Qianzhousaurus sinensis
        - - Alioramus altai
          - Alioramus remotus
    - - - Nanuqsaurus
        - Teratophoneus curriei
      - - Lythronax argestes
        - - - Daspletosaurus horneri
            - Daspletosaurus torosus
          - - Zhuchengtyrannus magnus
            - - Tarbosaurus bataar
              - Tyrannosaurus rex

In a popular book published in 2016, Paul suggested that Lythronax argestes may be a member of the genus Tyrannosaurus, and remarked that derived tyrannosaurids "are being badly oversplit at the genus level". Subsequent publications—including both taxonomic and phylogenetic analyzes—have retained the species in the separate genus Lythronax. In 2023, paleontologists Charlie R. Scherer and Christian Voiculescu-Holvad moved Lythronax to the new clade Teratophoneini along with Teratophoneus and Dynamoterror.

== Paleobiogeography ==
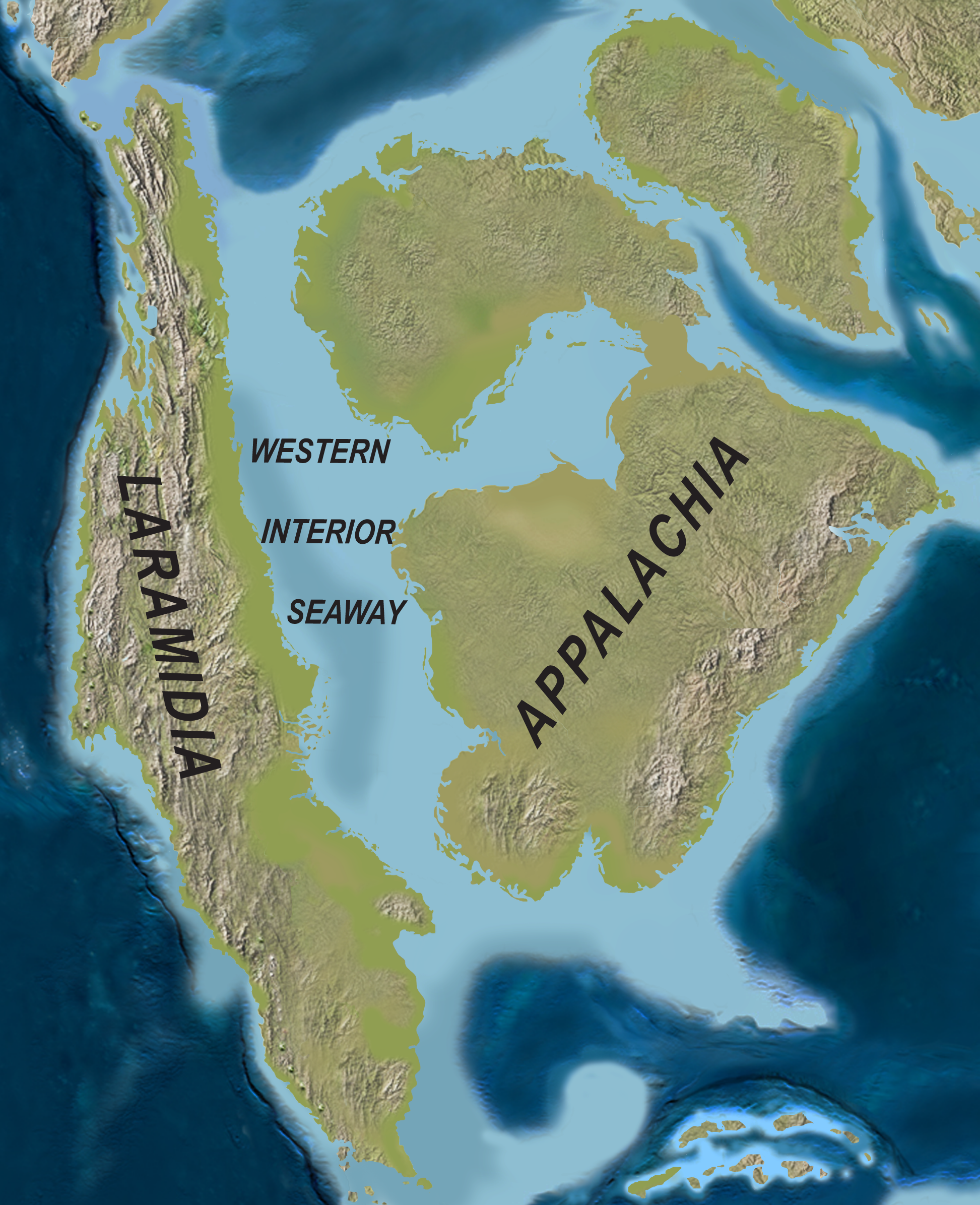
Paleomap of North America during the Campanian age; Lythronax lived in southern Laramidia (lower left).

During the Late Cretaceous period (around 95 million years ago), the Western Interior Seaway isolated western North America (Laramidia) from eastern North America (Appalachia), and occasionally isolated depositional basins from each other. This led to the development of highly endemic ecosystems in Laramidia; these ecosystems have also roughly been divided into a northern province and a southern province, but such a clean division is contested. Like many Laramidian dinosaur lineages, the evolutionary history of tyrannosaurids—which are limited in distribution to Asia and Laramidia—is characterized by faunal interchange between the two continents. The sequence of interchange events which occurred among Laramidian tyrannosaurids is unclear, and the diverse tyrannosauroids which have been discovered in southern Laramidia (including Lythronax, Teratophoneus, and Bistahieversor) have complicated their evolutionary history further. In particular, an unresolved question is whether Tyrannosaurus originated from Asian tyrannosaurids or from south Laramidian tyrannosaurids.

Based on their phylogenetic results, Zanno and colleagues proposed that the then-unnamed Lythronax displayed features that united tyrannosaurids from southern Laramidia to the exclusion of other genera. While Loewen and colleagues did not recover a unique group of southern taxa, they did resolve all three as being closely related to each other and basal to a group of larger, later forms. From these results, Loewen and colleagues suggested that there was significant biogeographic division between northern Laramidian and southern Laramidian forms with limited interchange. Also, because they found Alioramini to be placed outside Tyrannosauridae, and the Asian genera Tarbosaurus and Zhuchengtyrannus in a group excluding all other tyrannosaurids, Loewen and colleagues proposed that there was only a single interchange of tyrannosaurids from North America to Asia. They suggested the interchange took place during the late Campanian, when global sea levels fell, Tyrannosaurus being descended from North American forms from before such migration took place.

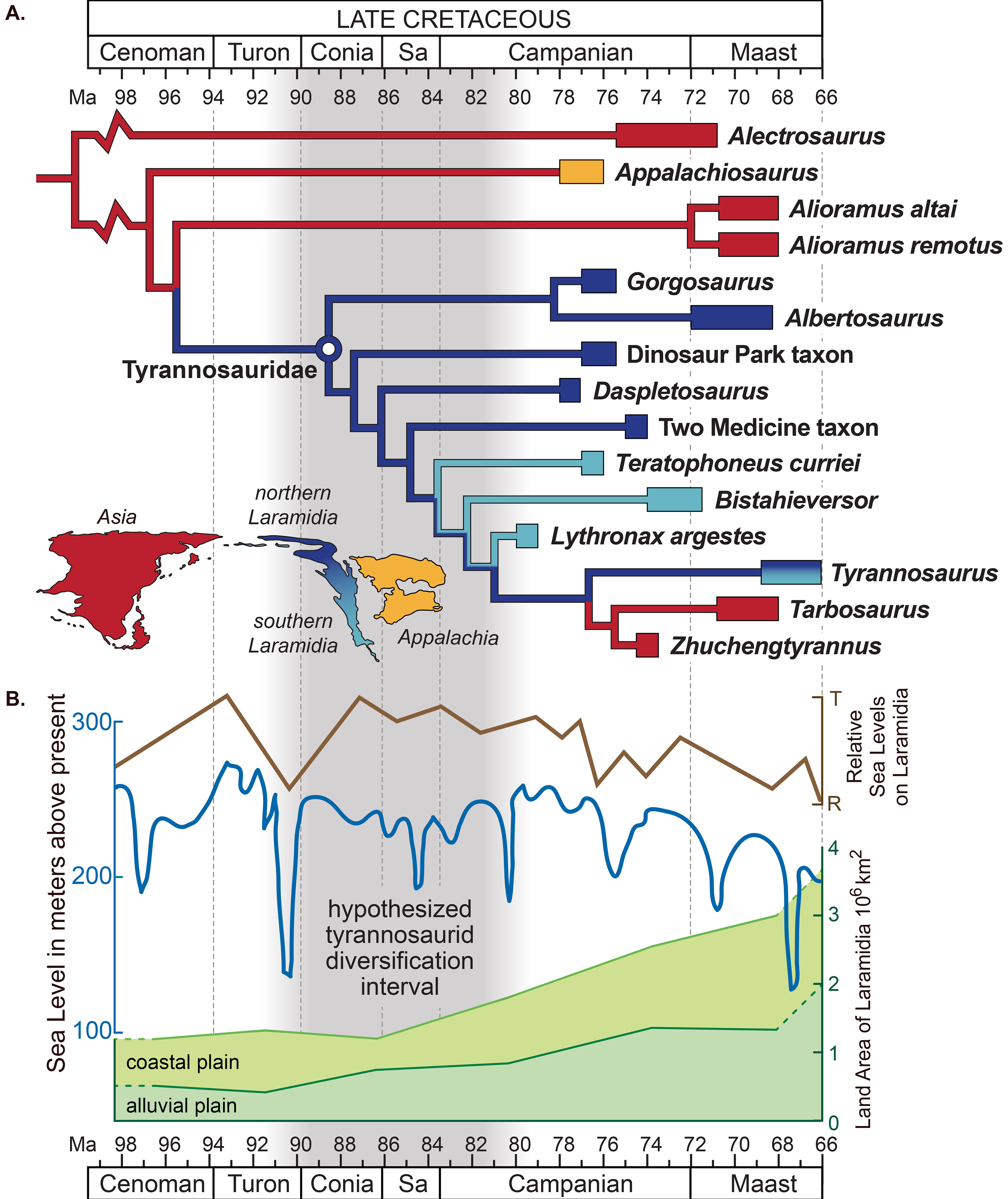
Correlation between sea level change and evolutionary diversification of Tyrannosauroidea as hypothesized by Loewen and colleagues in 2013

Due to their differing phylogenetic results, the biogeographic conclusions of Loewen and colleagues were disputed by Brusatte and Carr. Since Bistahieversor from southern Laramidia was placed outside Tyrannosauridae, and Teratophoneus from Utah nested closest to the Alaskan Nanuqsaurus, Brusatte and Carr instead suggested that there were dynamic and recurrent interchanges of tyrannosaurid fauna between northern and southern Laramidia, and rejected the presence of endemic provinces. The Asian taxa Tarbosaurus, Zhuchengtyrannus, Qianzhousaurus, and Alioramus were also placed within Tyrannosaurinae, among North American genera. Brusatte and Carr proposed that at least two continental interchanges occurred, where Tyrannosaurinae originated in Asia and migrated to North America after the divergence of alioramins, and then returned to Asia again with Tarbosaurus and Zhuchengtyrannus. Another possible scenario suggested by Brusatte and Carr was that two separate migrations to Asia occurred, which separately gave rise to alioramins and larger, later forms. In both scenarios, Tyrannosaurus, nested among Asian taxa, was an "invasive migrant species that spread across Laramidia" from Asia in the Maastrichtian.

The hypotheses of Asian-North American migration of Brusatte and Carr were supported by a later run of their analysis by Canadian paleontologist Jared Voris and colleagues in 2020. However, Voris and colleagues amended the original analysis through the additions of the genera Dynamoterror from southern Laramidia (New Mexico) and Thanatotheristes from northern Laramidia (Alberta), and they were able to replicate the north–south divisions of tyrannosaurids suggested by Loewen and colleagues. The southern taxa Teratophoneus, Dynamoterror, and Lythronax formed an exclusive group (to the exclusion of Nanuqsaurus, contrary to Brusatte and Carr) of short- and deep-snouted taxa outside a group of more derived northern Laramidian forms, and the southern Laramidian forms also had a separate skeletal morphotype. Voris and colleagues suggested these morphological differences arose for ecological reasons, possibly including prey composition or feeding strategies. As the major prey groups were the same between northern and southern Laramidia when tyrannosaurids lived in those regions, Voris and colleagues concluded the differences in cranial anatomy arose from differences in feeding strategies.

== Paleobiology ==
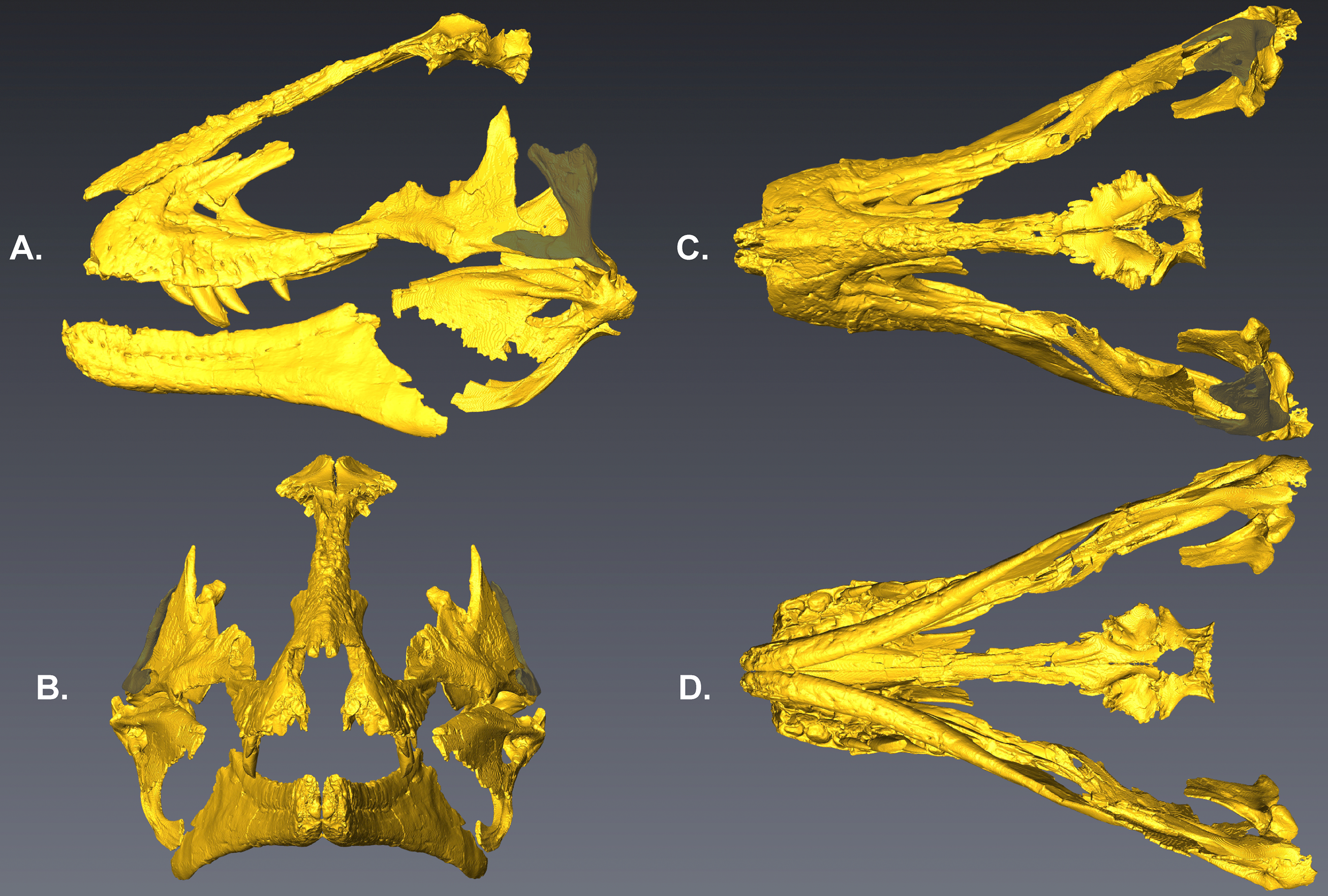
Holotype skull reconstructed from 3D scans shown in multiple views

Lythronax differed from most other tyrannosaurids due to its shortened skull with a broadened rear, as well as its forward-directed orbits (which were a direct consequence of its skull morphology). No other tyrannosauroids had such forward-directed orbits except for Tyrannosaurus and Tarbosaurus, although more derived tyrannosauroids generally had larger and more forward-directed orbits than basal tyrannosauroids. The discovery of Lythronax suggests that these characters had appeared by at least 80 million years ago.

The forward-directed orbits of Lythronax would have enhanced the field of view of its binocular vision by increasing the separation between the orbits and making their lines of sight more parallel to each other (i.e. reducing the optic axis divergence), which would have given Lythronax depth perception. In 2006, paleontologist Kent Stevens suggested that the similar orbits of Tyrannosaurus would have aided either pursuit predation by the observation of distant prey and the three-dimensional detection of obstacles, or ambush predation by the ability to judge the timing and direction of lunges.

As a tyrannosaurid, Lythronax would likely have shared the group's other specializations to predatory lifestyles, including large body size; a large skull with powerful jaw muscles and robust teeth; reinforced sutures holding the skull bones together; and relatively small forelimbs. The teeth and jaw muscles of Lythronax would have contributed to strong bite forces, for not just carving out chunks of flesh but also crushing bone. The stresses and loads of these bites would have been effectively absorbed by the fused, arched nasal bones and the reinforced sutures.

== Paleoenvironment ==
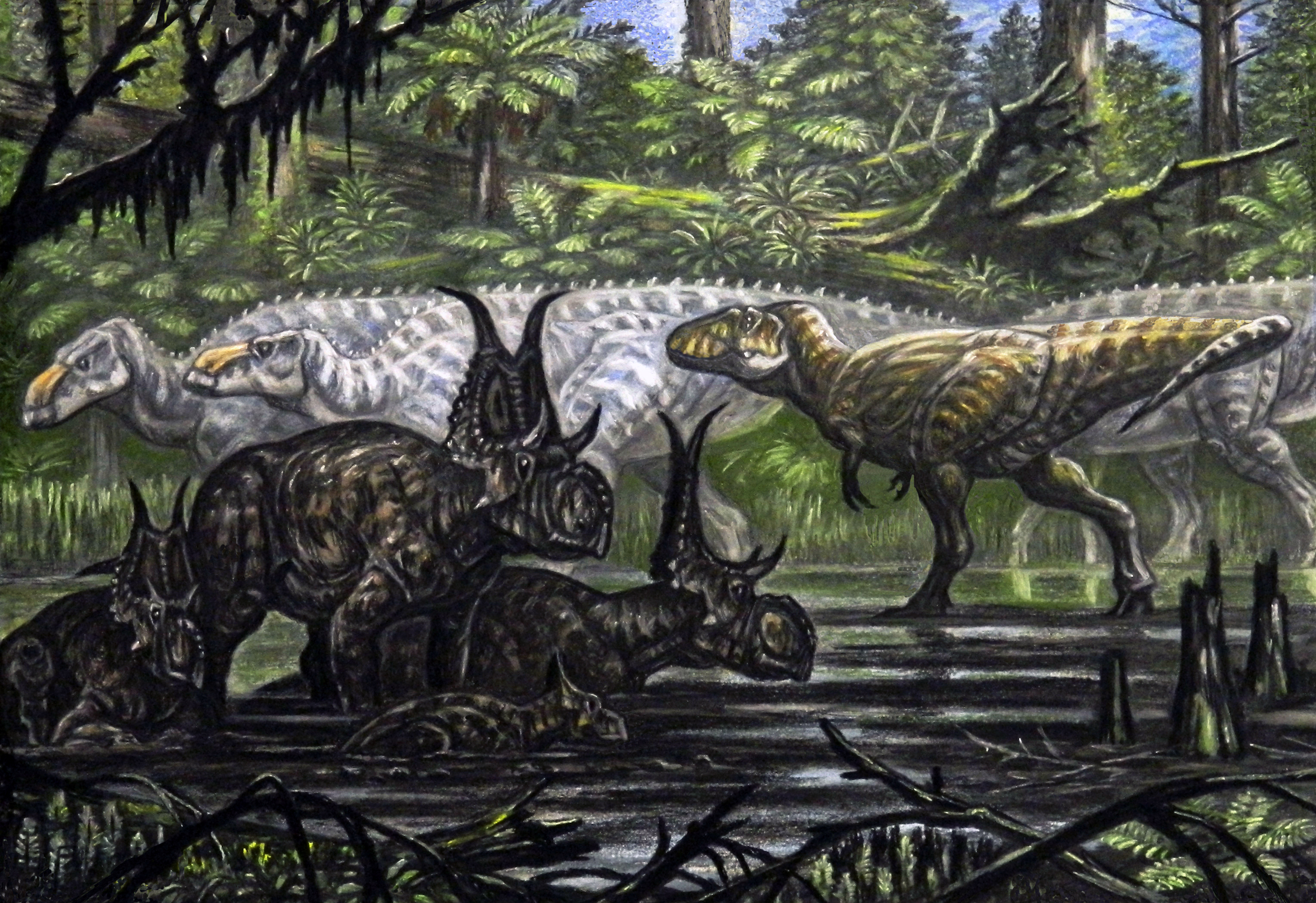
Lythronax with contemporary dinosaurs of the Wahweap Formation

Lythronax was found in terrestrial sedimentary rocks belonging to the lower part of the Reynolds Point Member of the Wahweap Formation. The age of the rocks that yielded Lythronax have been estimated to be 81.49 Ma, with a range of uncertainty between 81.86-81.45 Ma. The overall Wahweap Formation has been radiometrically dated as being between 82.2 and 77.3 million years old. During the time Lythronax lived, the Western Interior Seaway was at its widest extent, almost completely isolating southern Laramidia from the rest of North America. The area where dinosaurs existed included lakes, floodplains, and rivers, which flowed east. The Wahweap Formation is part of the Grand Staircase region, an immense sequence of sedimentary rock layers that stretch south from Bryce Canyon National Park through Zion National Park and into the Grand Canyon. Among other lines of evidence, the presence of rapidly deposited sediments suggests a wet, seasonal climate.

Lythronax was likely the largest predator of its ecosystem. It shared its paleoenvironment with other dinosaurs, such as the hadrosaurs Acristavus and Adelolophus, the ceratopsian Diabloceratops, and unnamed ankylosaurs and pachycephalosaurs. Vertebrates present in the Wahweap Formation at the time included freshwater fish, bowfins, abundant rays and sharks, turtles such as Compsemys, crocodilians, and lungfish. Numerous mammals lived in this region, which included several genera of multituberculates, cladotherians, marsupials, and placental insectivores. The mammals were more primitive than those that lived in the younger Kaiparowits Formation. Trace fossils are relatively abundant in the Wahweap Formation, and suggest the presence of crocodylomorphs, as well as ornithischian and theropod dinosaurs. Evidence of invertebrate activity in this formation ranged from fossilized insect burrows in petrified logs to fossils of mollusks, large crabs, and a wide diversity of gastropods and ostracods.

== See also ==
- Timeline of tyrannosaur research
