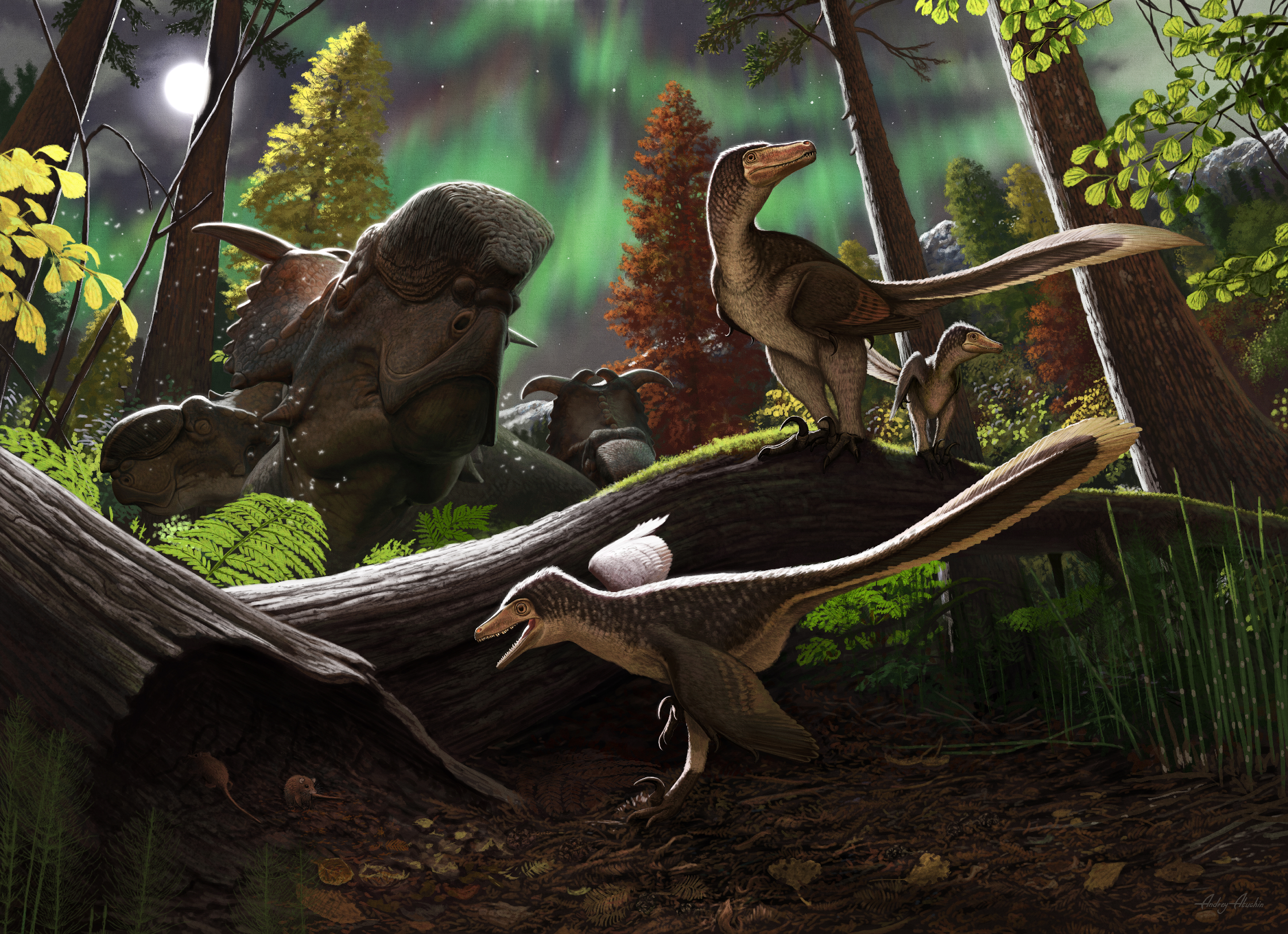
- Unnuakomys (lower left, inside hollow trunk) being stalked by a dromaeosaur, alongside Pachyrhinosaurus

Scientific classification
- Kingdom: Animalia
- Phylum: Chordata
- Class: Mammalia
- Family: †Pediomyidae
- Genus: †Unnuakomys; Eberle et al., 2019

Type species
- †Unnuakomys hutchisoni Eberle et al., 2019

= Unnuakomys =

Unnuakomys Temporal range: Maastrichtian 69 Ma

Extinct genus of mammals

Unnuakomys is an extinct genus of metatherian mammal from the Maastrichtian age of the Late Cretaceous. It was discovered in the Prince Creek Formation of Alaska, and is the northernmost metatherian known. The type (and only) species is U. hutchisoni.

== Taxonomy ==
The known fossil material of Unnuakomys consists of over 60 teeth, along with multiple dentaries and a maxillary fragment. These fossils are from the Pediomys Point locality of the Prince Creek Formation. The holotype is DMNH 21353, a left maxillary fragment containing second and third molars.

The generic name Unnuakomys is derived from "Unnuak" (pronounced Oo-noo-ok), an Iñupiaq word for night, combined with the Greek "mys", meaning mouse. The specific name honors paleontologist J. Howard Hutchison, who discovered the Pediomys Point locality.

== Paleobiology ==
Weighing less than an ounce, Unnuakomys was about the size of a mouse. It was likely an insectivore.
