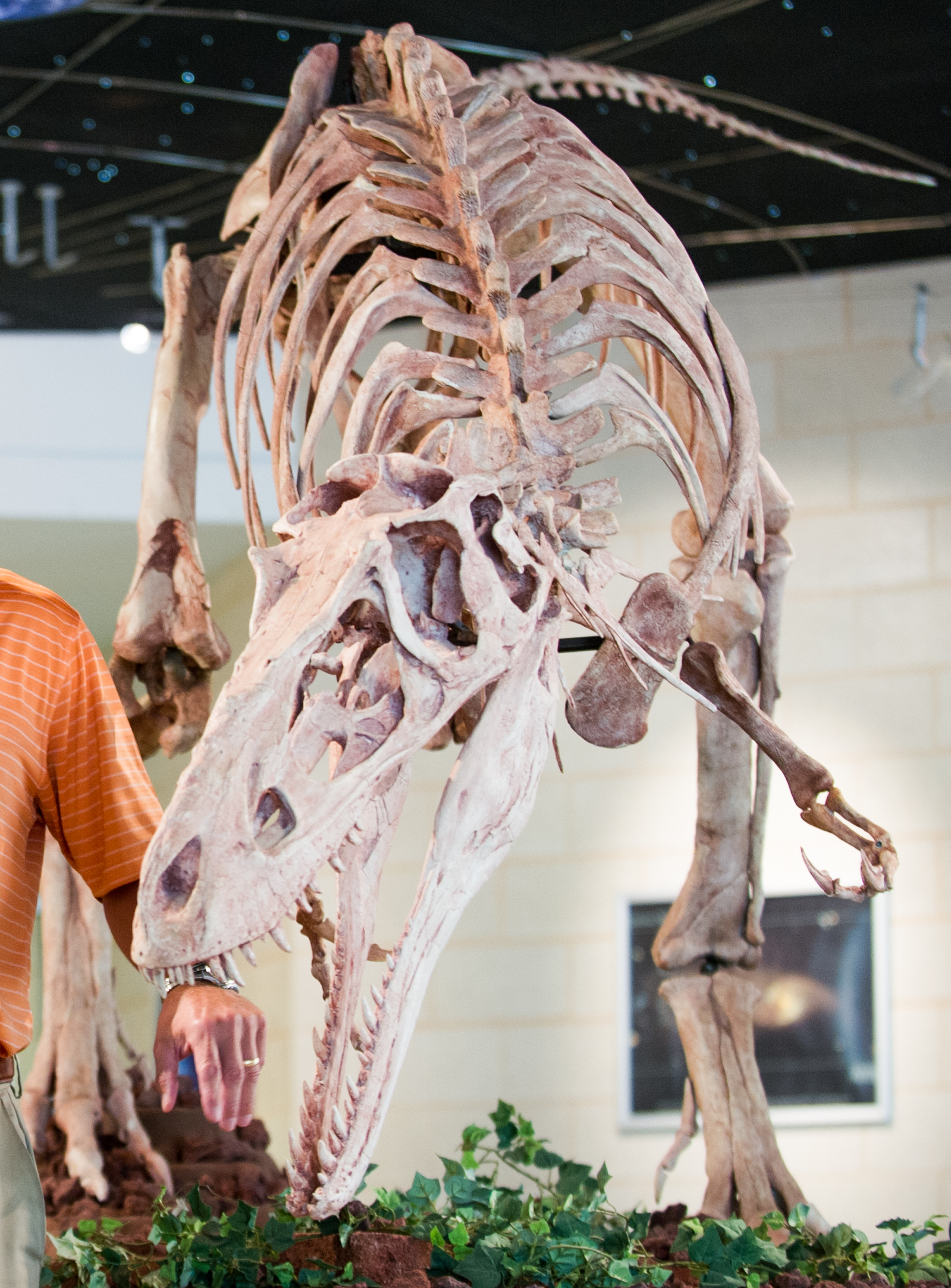
- Skeleton mount at Texas A&M University-Commerce

Scientific classification
- Kingdom: Animalia
- Phylum: Chordata
- Class: Reptilia
- Clade: Dinosauria
- Clade: Saurischia
- Clade: Theropoda
- Superfamily: †Tyrannosauroidea
- Family: †Tyrannosauridae
- Tribe: †Alioramini
- Genus: †Alioramus; Kurzanov, 1976

Type species
- †Alioramus remotus Kurzanov 1976

Other species
- †A. altai Brusatte et al., 2009

Synonyms
- Qianzhousaurus? Lü et al., 2014

= Alioramus =

Alioramus Temporal range: Late Cretaceous, Maastrichtian

Tyrannosaurid theropod dinosaur genus from the Late Cretaceous period

Alioramus (/ˌælioʊˈreɪməs/; meaning 'different branch') is a genus of tyrannosaurid theropod dinosaurs from the Late Cretaceous period of Asia. It currently contains two species. The type species, A. remotus is known from a partial skull and three foot bones recovered from the Mongolian Nemegt Formation, which was deposited in a humid floodplain. These remains were named and described by Soviet paleontologist Sergei Kurzanov in 1976. A second species, A. altai, known from a much more complete skeleton also from the Nemegt Formation, was named and described by Stephen L. Brusatte and colleagues in 2009. Its relationships to other tyrannosaurid genera were at first unclear, with some evidence supporting a hypothesis that Alioramus was closely related to the contemporary species Tarbosaurus bataar. However, the discovery of Qianzhousaurus indicates that it belongs to a distinct branch of tyrannosaurs, namely the tribe Alioramini.

Alioramus were bipedal like all known theropods, and their sharp teeth indicate that they were carnivores. Known specimens were smaller than other tyrannosaurids like Tarbosaurus bataar and Tyrannosaurus rex, but their adult size is difficult to estimate since both Alioramus species are known only from juvenile or sub-adult remains. The genus Alioramus is characterized by a row of five bony crests along the top of the snout, a greater number of teeth than any other genus of tyrannosaurid, and a lower skull than most other tyrannosaurids.

== History of discovery ==
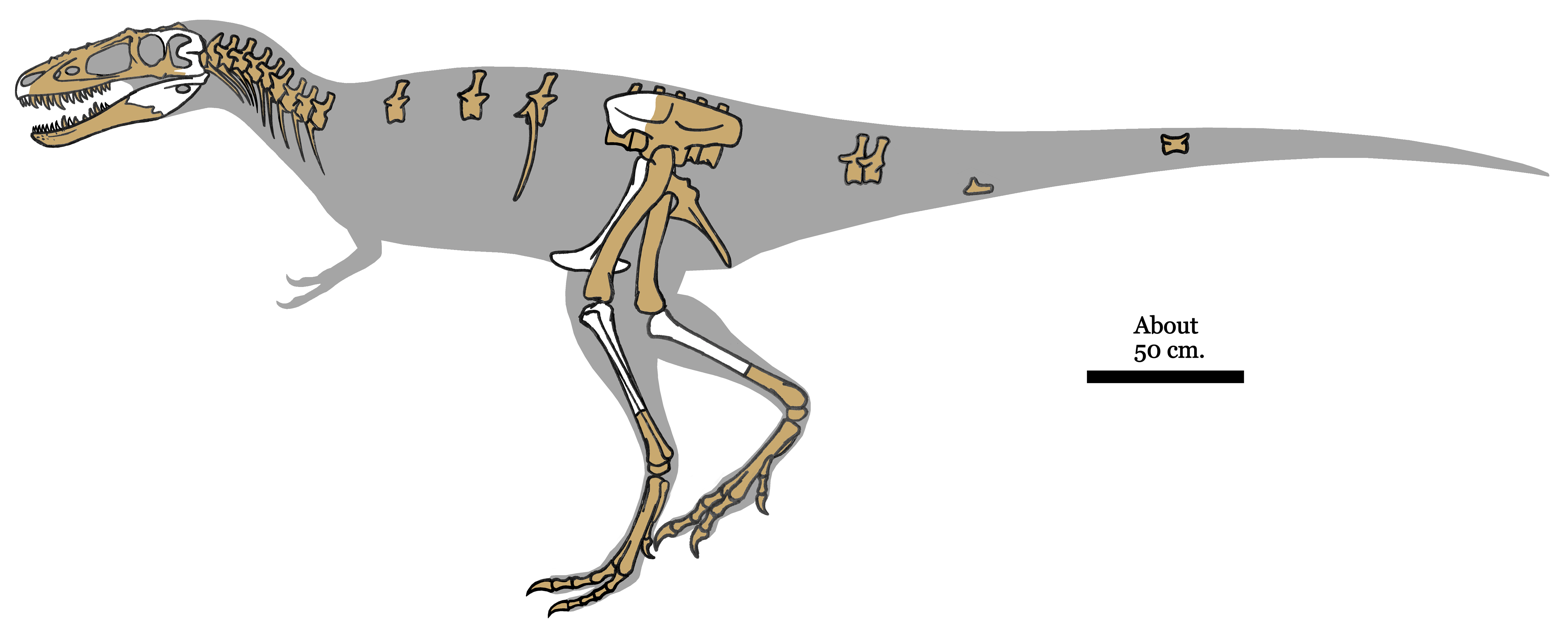
A. altai skeletal diagram, known portions in yellow

The holotype (PIN 3141/1) of Alioramus is a partial skull associated with three metatarsals. A joint Soviet-Mongolian expedition to the Gobi Desert in the early 1970s found these remains at a locality known as Nogon-Tsav in the Mongolian province of Bayankhongor, Nemegt Formation. Alioramus was named and described by Russian paleontologist Sergei Kurzanov in 1976. Its crests and low skull profile looked so different from other tyrannosaurids that Kurzanov believed his find was far removed from other members of the family. Accordingly, he gave it the generic name Alioramus, derived from the Latin alius ('other') and ramus ('branch'), and the specific name A. remotus, which means 'removed' in Latin. The fossil material of the second species named in 2009, A. altai, was discovered back in 2001 at the Tsagan Khushu locality also from the Nemegt Formation. However, several faunal differences may suggest that the respective locations of A. remotus and A. altai differ in age. The holotype IGM 100/1844 is a partial skeleton that includes a very complete skull—more so than A. remotus—with partial vertebrae, pelvic girdle and hindlimbs. The name for this species, altai, is in reference to the Altai Mountains.

== Description ==
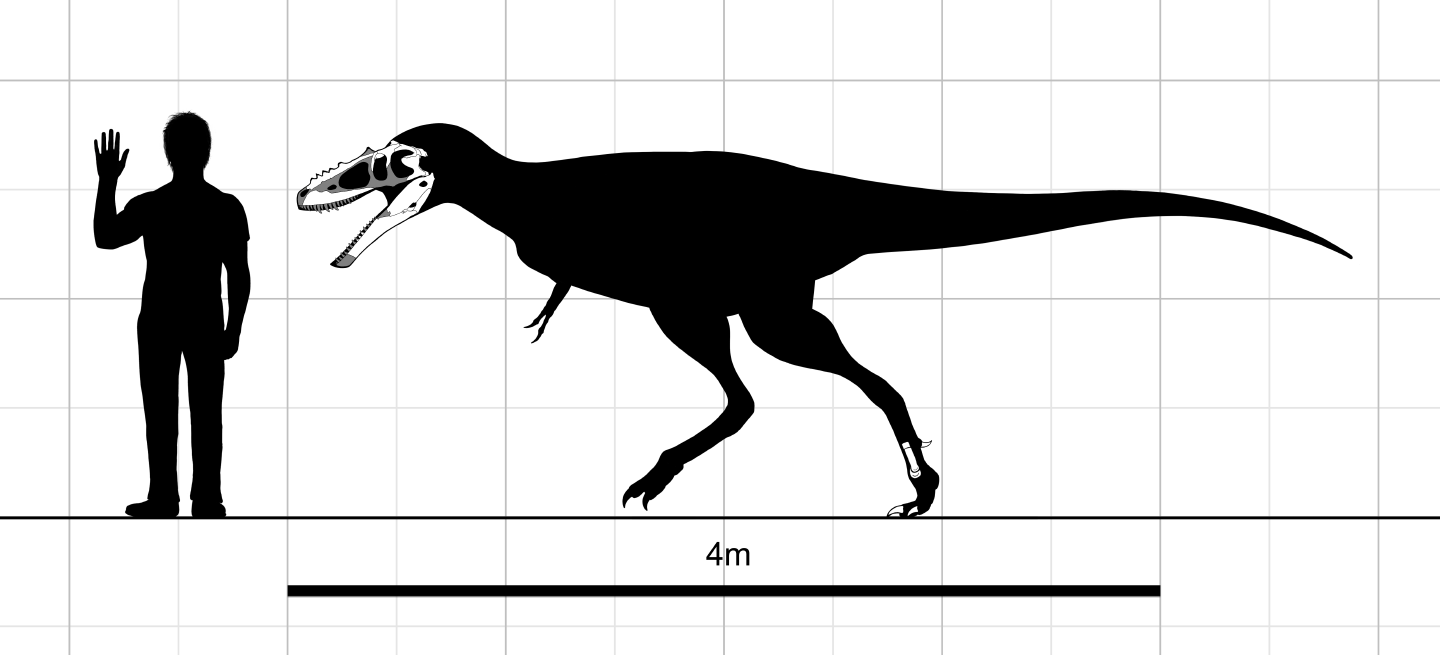
Size of A. remotus compared with a Human

Alioramus remotus was estimated at 5 to 6 m (16 to 20 ft) in length when originally described by Sergei Kurzanov in 1976. In 1988 Paul gave a similar length of 6 m (20 ft) and a weight of 700 kg (1,500 lb). In 2016 Molina-Pérez and Larramendi estimated A. remotus at 5.5 m (18 ft) and 500 kg (1,100 lb), and A. altai at 5 m (16 ft) and 385 kg (849 lb). Kurzanov, however, did not correct for lengthening of the skull by deformation during fossilization, which may indicate a shorter overall body length for this individual. If this specimen is a juvenile, then adult Alioramus would have reached greater lengths, but no confirmed adult specimens are known.

=== Skull ===
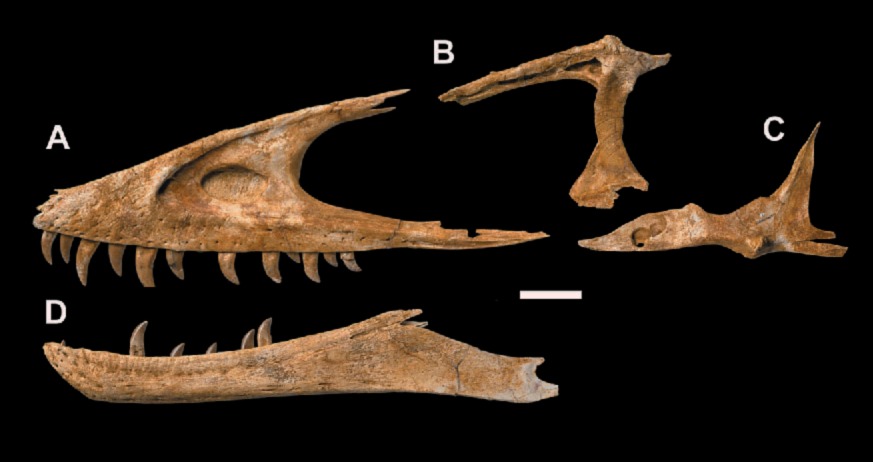
(A) maxilla, (B) lacrimal, (C) jugal bones, and (D) dentary of A. altai

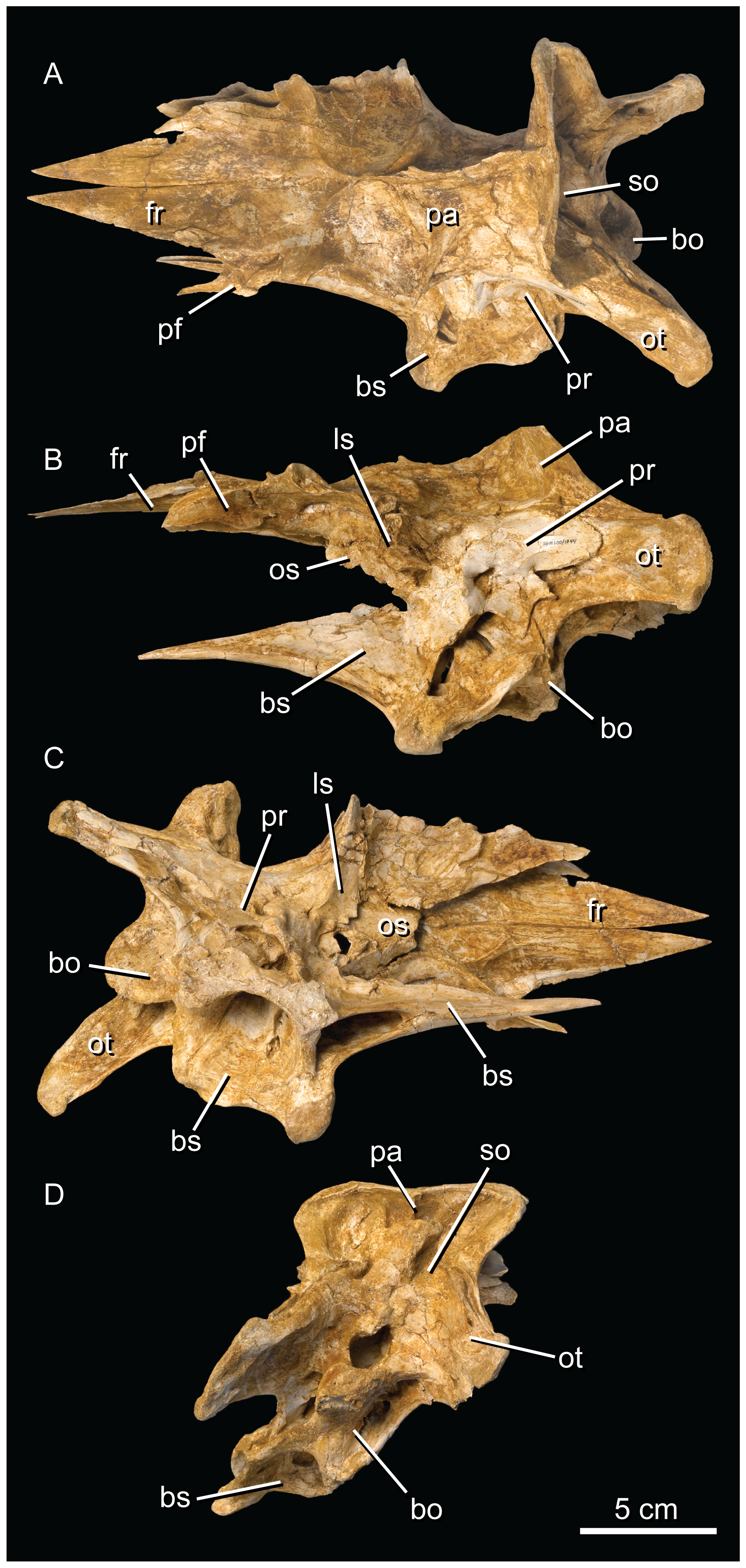
Braincase complex of A. altai

The skull of A. remotus was approximately 45 cm (1.48 ft) long. In general, it is long and low, a shape typical of more basal tyrannosauroids and juveniles of larger tyrannosaurids. The premaxillary bones at the tip of the snout in Alioramus remotus have not been found, but are taller than wide in all tyrannosauroids for which they are known. The nasal bones are fused and ornamented with a row of five irregular bony crests that protrude upwards from the midline, where the nasal bones are sutured together. These crests all measure more than 1 cm (0.39 in) tall.

At the back of the skull there is a protrusion, called the nuchal crest, arising from the fused parietal bones, a feature shared with all tyrannosaurids. In Alioramus, the nuchal crest is greatly thickened, similarly to Tarbosaurus and Tyrannosaurus. Like the rest of the skull, the lower jaw of Alioramus was long and slender, another possible juvenile characteristic. As in Tarbosaurus, a ridge on the outer surface of the angular bone of the lower jaw articulated with the rear of the dentary bone, locking the two bones together and removing much of the flexibility seen in other tyrannosaurids. Other tyrannosaurids had four premaxillary teeth, D-shaped in cross section, on each side. Including 16 or 17 in each maxilla, and 18 in each dentary, Alioramus had 76 or 78 teeth, more than any other tyrannosaurid. The braincase of A. altai was intermediate between the basal theropod and avialan conditions.

=== Postcranial skeleton ===
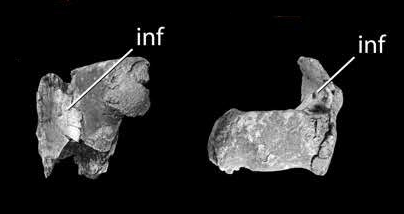
Femur head of A. altai

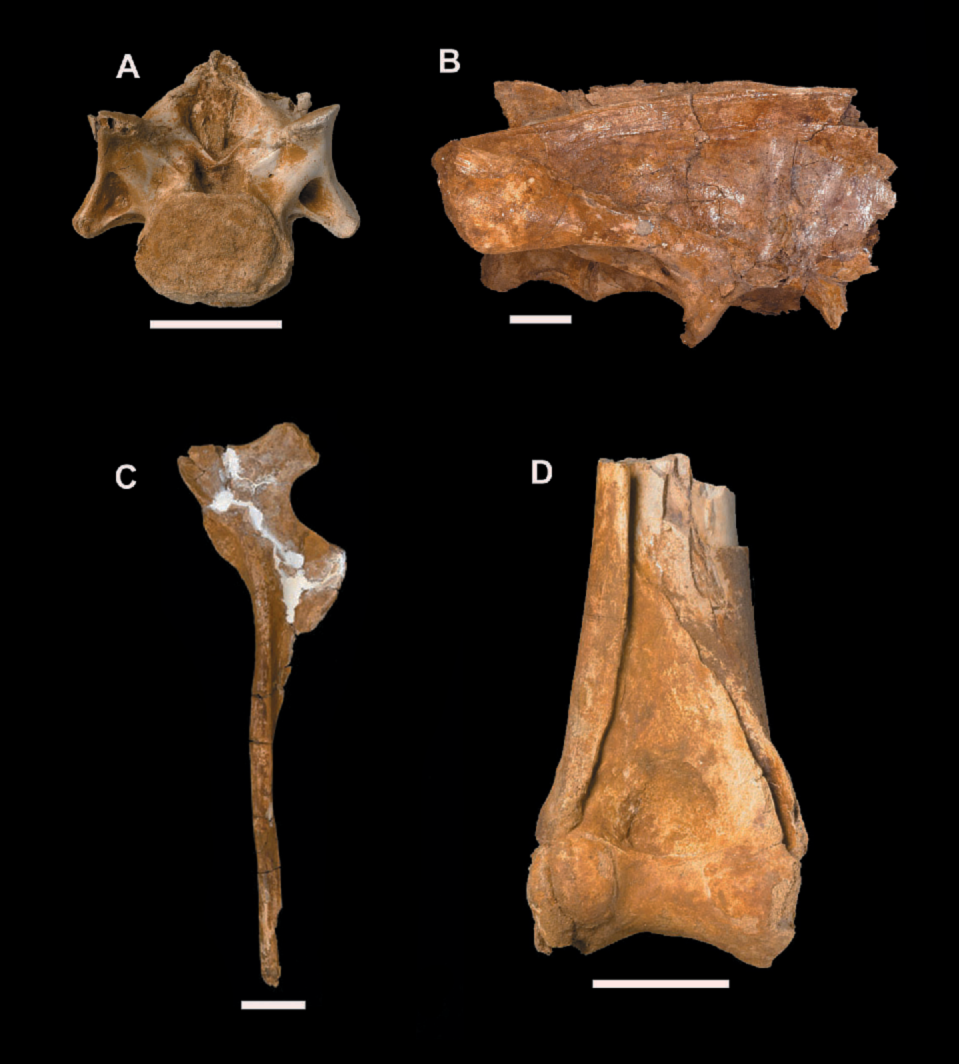
(A) cervical vertebra, (B) right ilium, (C) right ischium, and (D) right tibio-astragalar complex bones of A. altai

The rest of the skeleton of Alioramus remotus is completely unknown except for three metatarsals (bones of the upper foot), but the discovery of A. altai, which is known from substantially more complete remains, has shed light on the anatomy of the genus.

== Classification ==
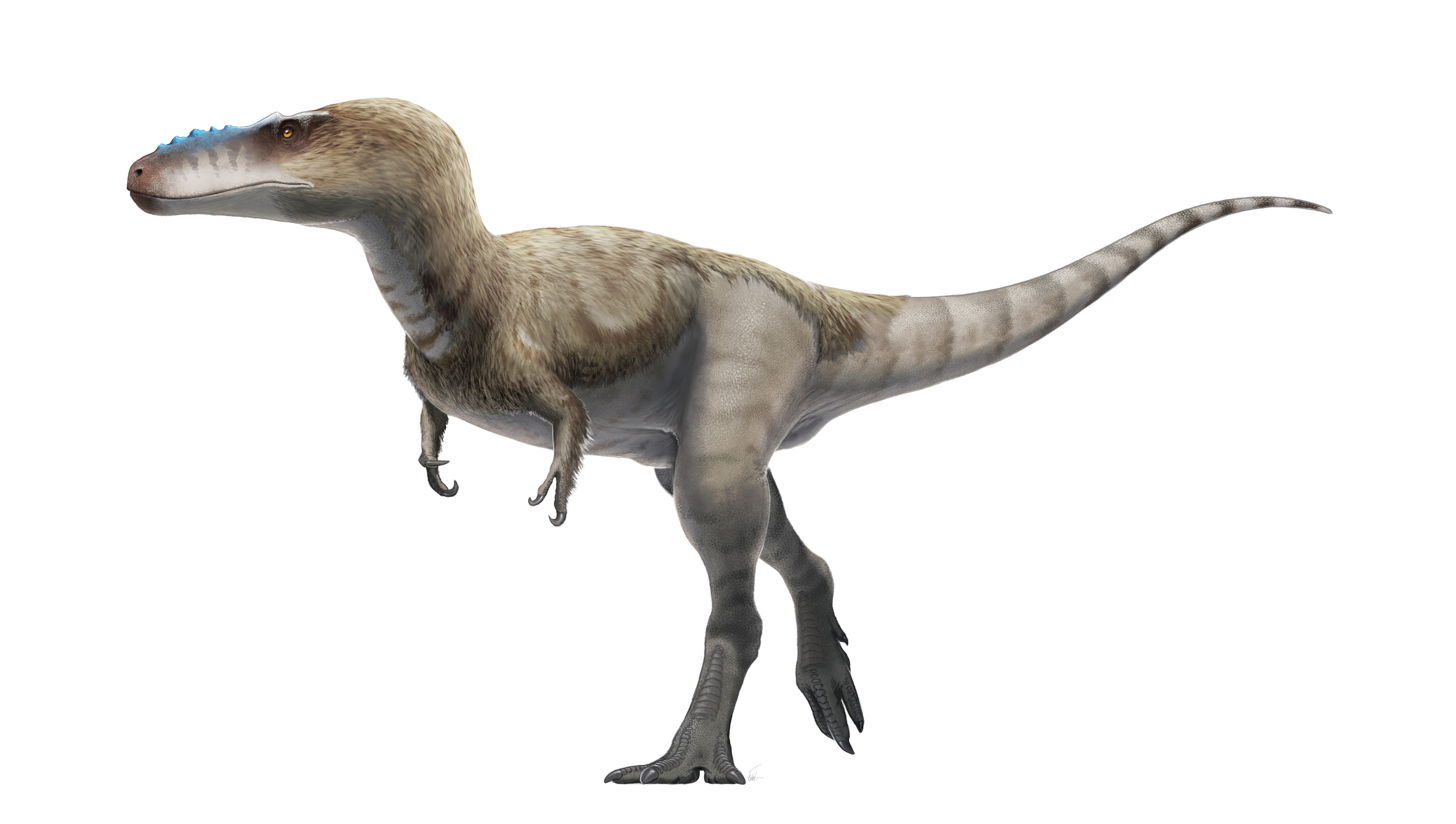
Life restoration of A. remotus

Paleontologists have long classified Alioramus within the superfamily Tyrannosauroidea, but because its remains were for many years poorly known, a more precise classification had remained elusive until the discovery of A. altai. A cladistic analysis published in 2003 found Alioramus could be further classified into the family Tyrannosauridae and the subfamily Tyrannosaurinae, alongside Tyrannosaurus, Tarbosaurus and Daspletosaurus. A 2004 study supported this result but suggested it was equally probable that Alioramus belonged outside the family Tyrannosauridae entirely, with its supposed juvenile characters actually reflecting a more basal position within Tyrannosauroidea. Another study omitted Alioramus altogether due to the only specimen's fragmentary nature. The description of A. altai in 2009 added further evidence to the idea that the genus was within the Tyrannosaurinae. Still, there are some studies which find it outside Tyrannosauridae.

Tarbosaurus and Alioramus shared several skull features, including a locking mechanism in the lower jaw between the dentary and angular bones, and both lacked the prong of the nasal bones which connected to the lacrimal bones in all other tyrannosaurids except adult Daspletosaurus. The two genera may be closely related, representing an Asian branch of the Tyrannosauridae. Some specimens of Tarbosaurus have a row of bumps on the nasal bones like those of Alioramus, although much lower. The long and low shape of the only known Alioramus remotus skull indicated that it was immature when it died and might even have been a juvenile Tarbosaurus, which lived in the same time and place. The more prominent nasal crests and much higher tooth count of Alioramus, however, suggested it was a separate taxon, even if it is known only from juvenile remains, confirmed by the discovery of A. altai. Specimens identified as immature Tarbosaurus have the same tooth count as adults.

The description of Qianzhousaurus in 2014 erected a new branch of the tyrannosaur family named Alioramini; consisting of the long-snouted Q. sinensis and the two known species of Alioramus. This clade had an uncertain placement relative to other members of the tyrannosaur branch in the initial analysis that discovered it. The primary phylogenetic analysis found Alioramini to be closer to Tyrannosaurus than to Albertosaurus, and therefore a member of the group Tyrannosaurinae. However, a second analysis in the same paper found it to be located outside of the clade including Albertosaurinae and Tyrannosaurinae, and therefore the sister group of Tyrannosauridae. Below is the first analysis found by the authors:

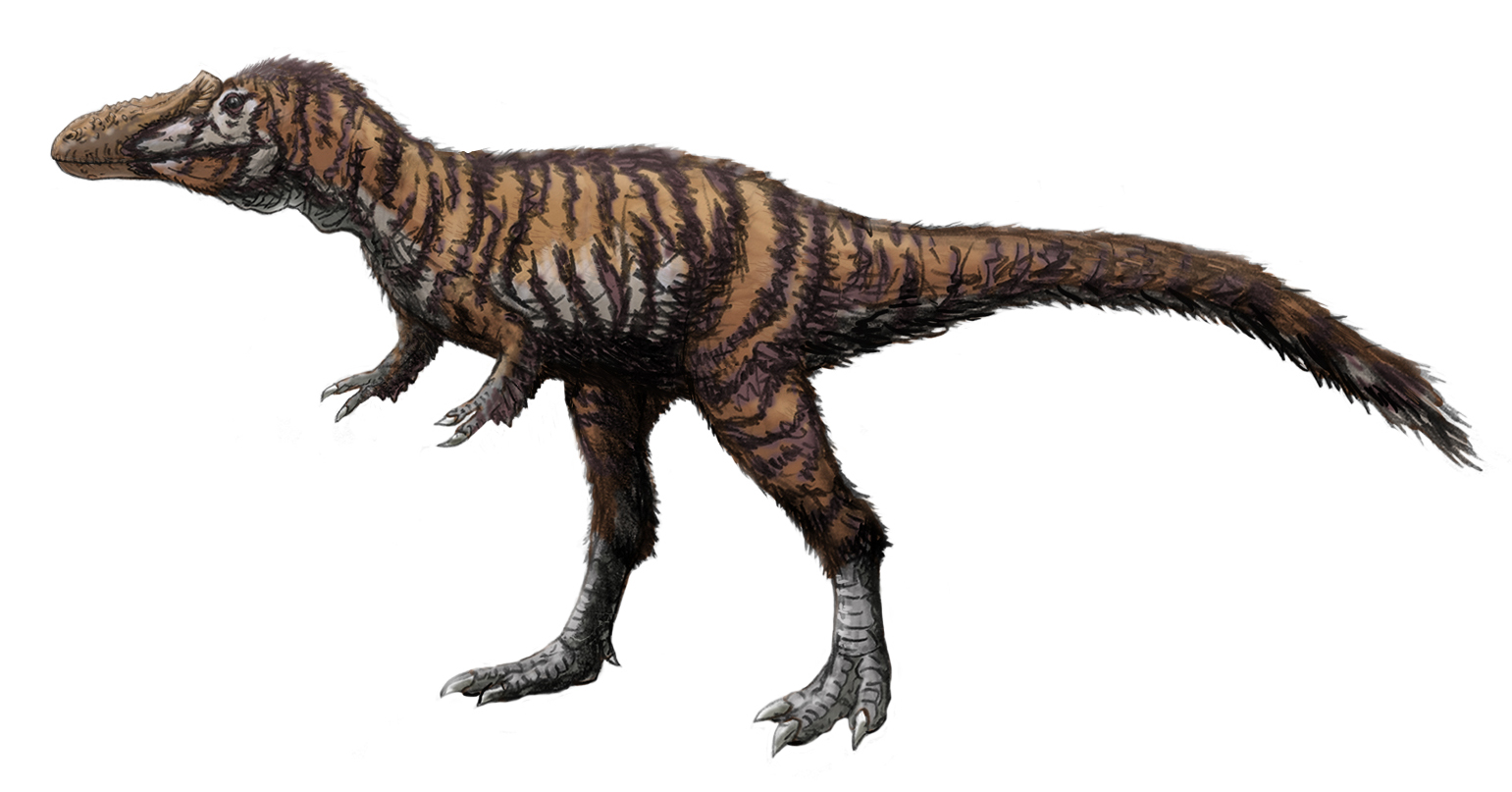
Restoration of A. altai

- Tyrannosauridae
  - Albertosaurinae
    - Gorgosaurus
    - Albertosaurus
  - Tyrannosaurinae
    - Alioramini
      - Qianzhousaurus
      - Alioramus altai
      - Alioramus remotus
    - - Teratophoneus
      - - Daspletosaurus
        - - Tyrannosaurus
          - Tarbosaurus

== Paleobiology ==
=== Feeding ===
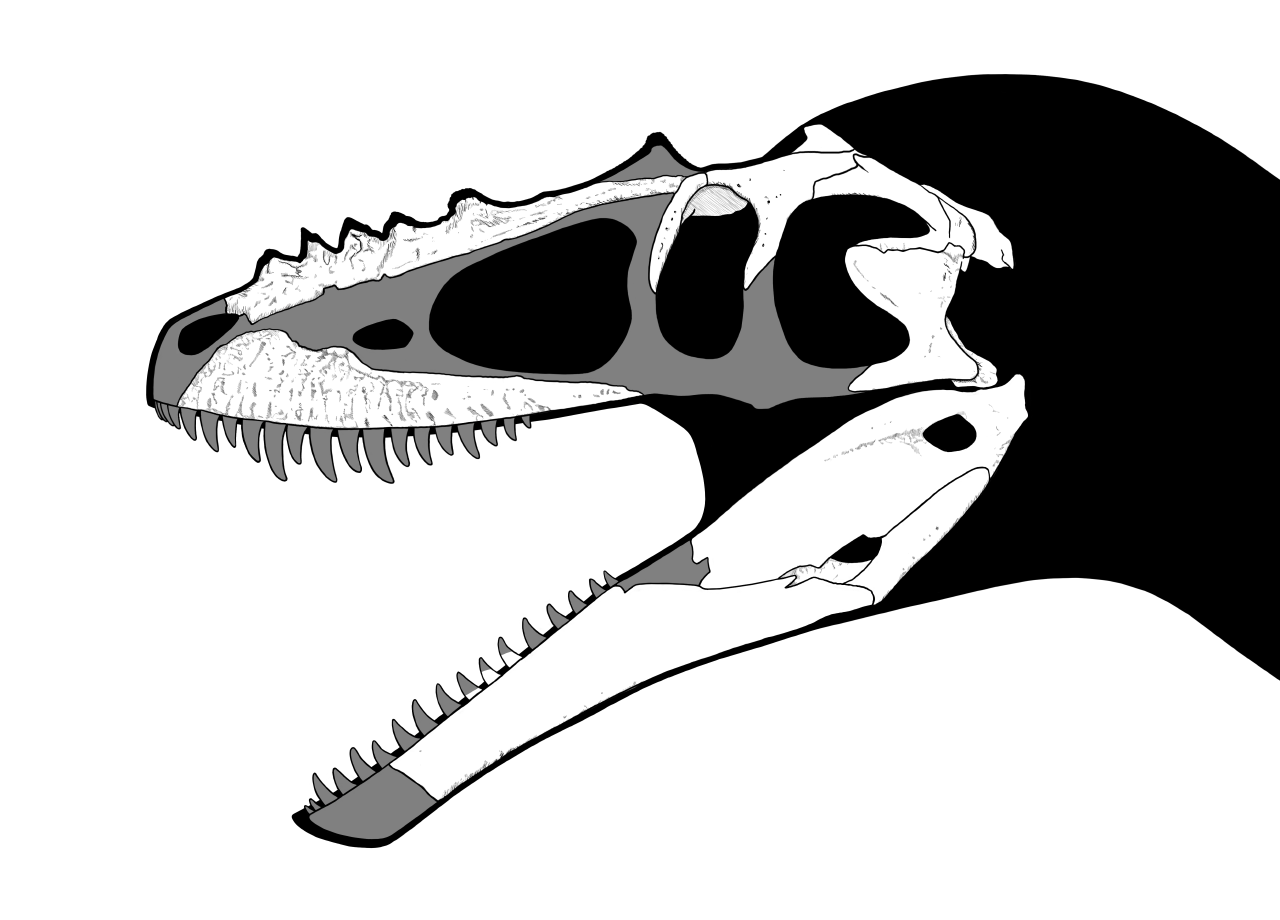
A. remotus Skull diagram, known portions in white

Brusatte and colleagues in 2009 indicated that Alioramus lacks many of the robust and brute skull traits (such as a deep maxilla, robust lower jaws, or peg-like teeth) that are necessary to employ a "puncture-pull" feeding characteristic of large tyrannosaurids. They suggested that Alioramus may have exploited a different feeding style, such as focusing small-sized prey. This would also suggest that both Alioramus and Tarbosaurus—whose remains have also been collected at the Tsagan Khushu locality, making them sympatric—used different feeding strategies, avoiding competition.

Foster with team in 2022 hypothesized that due to their slim and gracile build, Alioramin genera may have been hunters of small, particularly fast and nimble prey, which would have allowed alioramins to avoid competition with larger tyrannosaurs that specialized in killing larger animals. The long and delicate snouts of alioramins like Alioramus and Qianzhousaurus may have also prevented them from killing the same prey species that juvenile and adult tyrannosaurids of tyrannosaurids like Tarbosaurus hunted, though these larger tyrannosaurs themselves may have hunted alioramins as prey on occasion. Alioramins may also have had a different feeding strategy than other tyrannosaurids, as their jaws seem to have been weaker than those of the larger genera, and even juveniles of larger species have proportionately higher bite forces than alioramins of equivalent size. Furthermore, Alioramins seemingly remained confined to Asia, suggesting some factor prevented them from colonizing the better-sampled fossil deposits from North America. Why this may be remains a mystery until more evidence is discovered.

Examinations of the skulls of various genera of tyrannosauroids suggest that Alioramus experienced lower stresses to its skull when feeding. Additionally, the same study suggests it and its relative Qianzhousaurus did not use the "puncture-and-pull" feeding method used by larger genera such as Tarbosaurus or Tyrannosaurus.

=== Ontogeny ===
Size comparison of three alioramin species (Alioramus in yellow)

Histological analyses performed on the holotype of A. altai (IGM 100/1844) by Brusatte and colleagues in 2009 determined that this individual had an internal bone structure corresponding to a nine year-old and actively growing Tyrannosaurus. The team however, noted that in terms of body size this individual is closer to a seven/eight year-old Albertosaurus or Gorgosaurus, and a five/six year-old Daspletosaurus or Tyrannosaurus, which may suggest that Alioramus attained a comparably smaller adult size. Lastly, Brusatte and team argued against the skull shape and cranial ornamentation of Alioramus being juvenile traits, given that: IGM 100/1844 is smaller and more slender than comparably aged Tyrannosaurus and has a longer snout than any known juvenile of large tyrannosaurids (Albertosaurus or Tarbosaurus); and several well-documented ontogenic (growth) series of other dinosaurs evidence that ornamentation increases throughout growth. The latter may suggest that adult Alioramus possessed a rather elaborate cranial ornamentation.

Examinations of Qianzhousaurus and its comparisons with both species of Alioramus published in 2022 suggests that both Alioramus species are known from juvenile specimens in different growth stages, and that Qianzhousaurus represents an adult example of the alioramini. The examinations also suggest that the variation seen between the various species is consistent with the growth trends seen in other tyrannosaurid genera, though specimens that could constitute a full growth series from infant to adult for each species have not been recovered for any of these tyrannosaurs. One part of the growth series across all specimens in this study was discovered to remain unique to alioramin tyrannosaurs; the rugose process of the jugal starts small and conical in early life, but becomes massive and indistinct as the animals grow. This same study also suggests Alioramins did not undergo a secondary metamorphosis from slender juveniles to robust adults like other tyrannosaurs such as Tarbosaurus and Tyrannosaurus did, but maintained a unique physiology better suited to pursuit of fast, small prey.

== Paleoenvironment ==
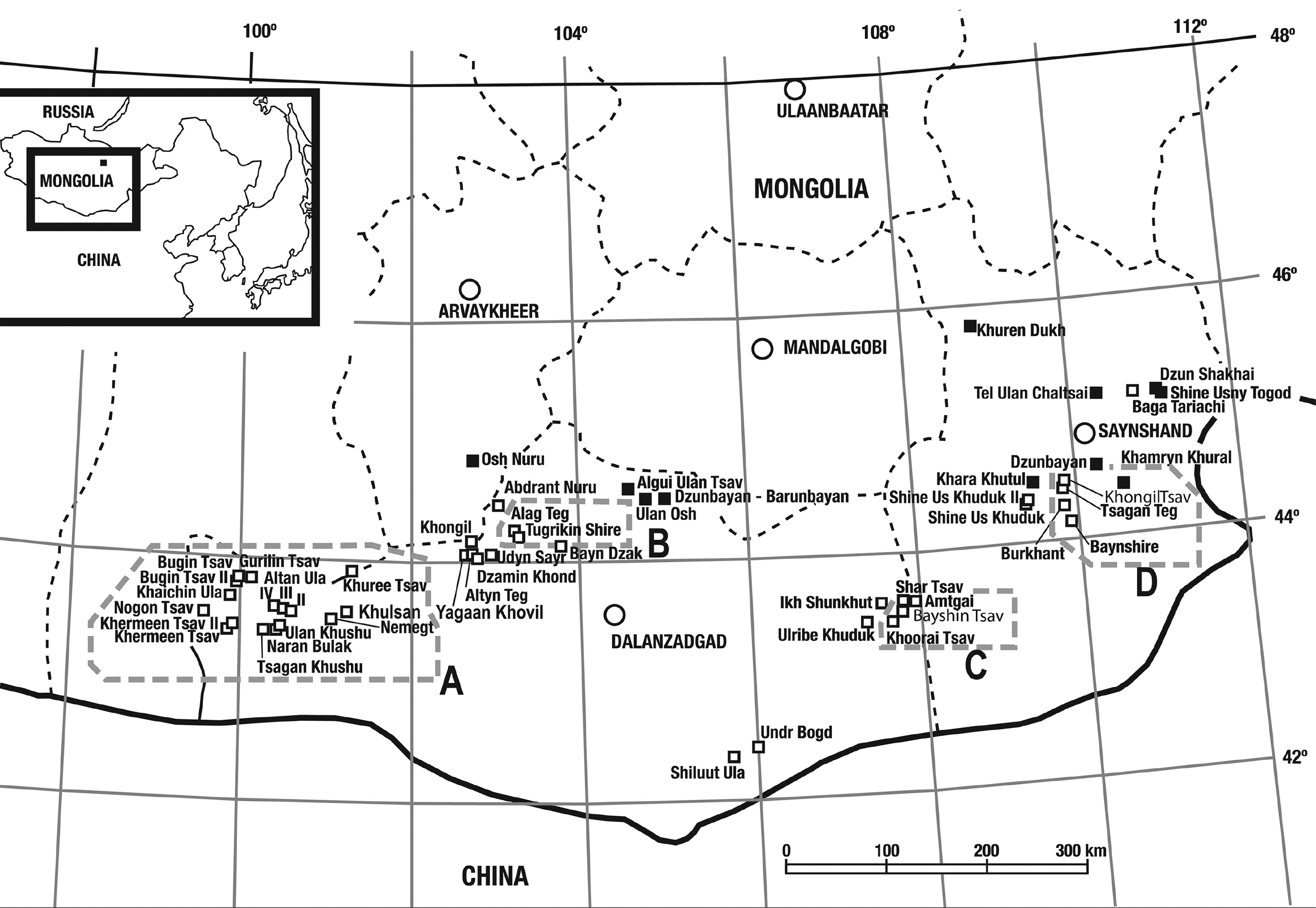
Cretaceous-aged Dinosaur fossil localities of Mongolia; Alioramus has been collected in area A (left)

The Beds of Nogon-Tsav are considered to be the same age as the Nemegt Formation. This geologic formation has never been dated radiometrically, but the fauna present in the fossil record indicate it was probably deposited during the Maastrichtian stage, at the end of the Late Cretaceous.

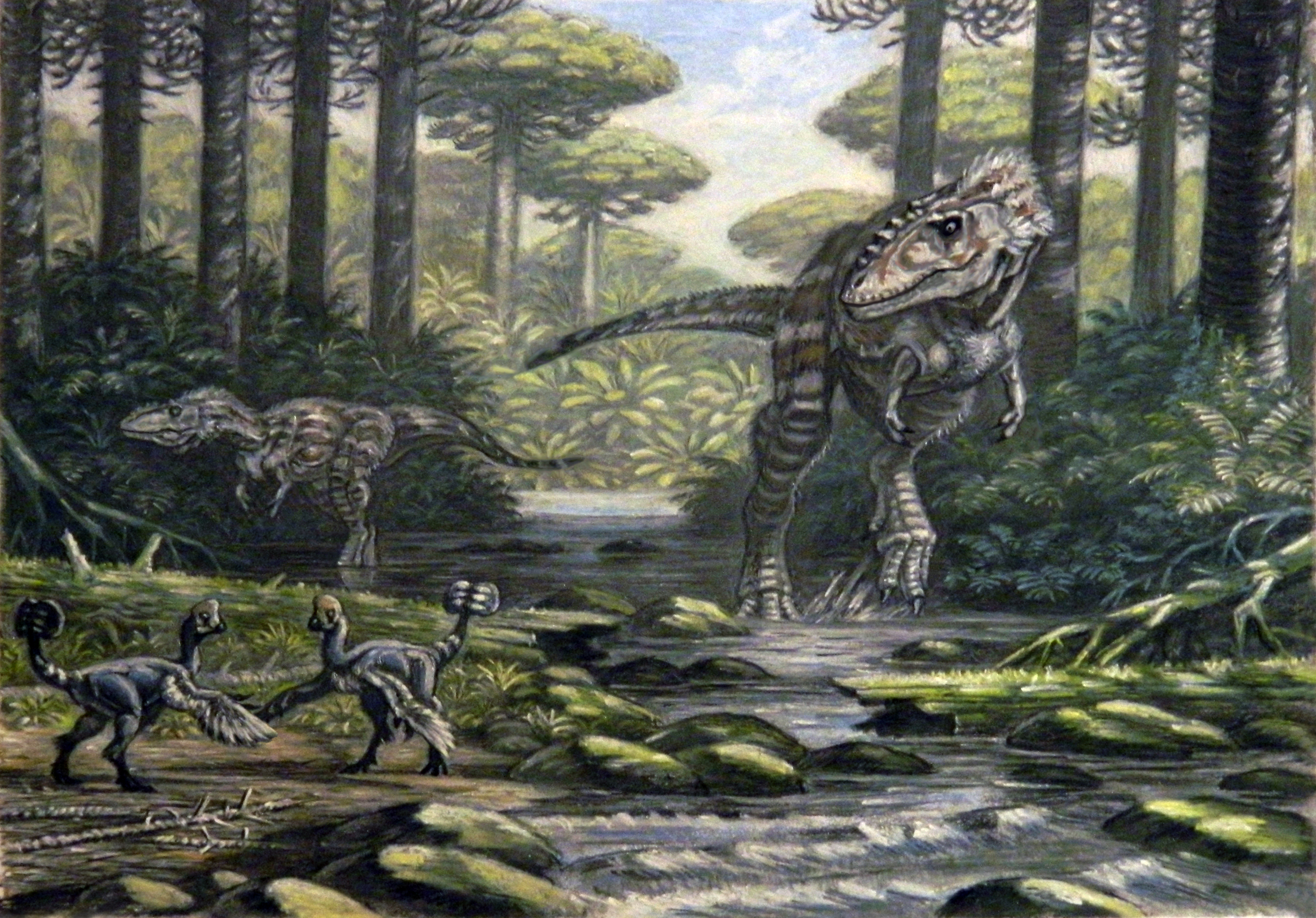
Life restoration of Alioramus in the paleoenvironments of the Nemegt Formation

The Maastrichtian stage in Mongolia, as preserved in the Nemegt Formation and at Nogon-Tsav, was characterized by a wetter and more humid climate compared with the semi-arid environment preserved in the earlier, underlying Barun Goyot and Djadochta Formations (however the Nemegt was still probably a cold semi arid climate). Nemegt sediments preserve floodplains, large river channels and soil deposits, but caliche deposits indicate periodic droughts. This environment supported a more diverse and generally larger dinosaur fauna than in earlier times. Kurzanov reported that other theropods, including Tarbosaurus, ornithomimosaurs and therizinosaurs were discovered at the same locality, but these remains have never been reported in detail. If the Nogon Tsav fauna was similar to that of the Nemegt Formation, troodontid theropods, as well as pachycephalosaurs, ankylosaurids and hadrosaurs would also have been present. Titanosaurian sauropods were also potential prey for predators in the Nemegt.

== See also ==
- Timeline of tyrannosaur research
