= Sinankylosaurus =

Sinankylosaurus Temporal range: Late Cretaceous (Campanian), ~77.3–73.5 Ma

Scientific classification
- Kingdom: Animalia
- Phylum: Chordata
- Class: Reptilia
- Clade: Dinosauria
- Clade: incertae sedis
- Genus: †Sinankylosaurus; Wang et al., 2020
- Species: †S. zhuchengensis

Binomial name
- †Sinankylosaurus zhuchengensis Wang et al., 2020

Extinct genus of dinosaur

Sinankylosaurus (meaning "Chinese fused lizard") is a dubious dinosaur genus known from the Late Cretaceous Hongtuya Formation of China. The genus contains a single species, Sinankylosaurus zhuchengensis, known from a partial right ilium (a pelvic bone). This specimen was originally described as belonging to an ankylosaur, although later research has disputed this identification, noting the lack of anatomical characters uniting Sinankylosaurus with this group.

== Discovery and classification ==
Beginning in 1964, after the discovery of a hadrosaur tibia that would later be assigned to Shantungosaurus, researchers began conducting paleontological fieldwork in the Wangshi Group in Shandong Province, China. Large-scale excavations conducted in 1988 and 2008 in three localities of this region yielded thousands of dinosaur remains, representing hadrosaurids, ceratopsians, sauropods, tyrannosaurids, and oviraptorosaurs. Together, these animals represent a faunal assemblage comparable to those in Late Cretaceous North America. Among the material collected was a nearly complete right ilium, housed in the Zhucheng Dinosaur Research Center, where it is accessioned as specimen ZJZ-183. This bone was found in outcrops of the Hongtuya Formation near Zangjiazhuang Village in Zhucheng of Shandong Province, China.

In 2020, Kebai Wang and colleagues described Sinankylosaurus zhuchengensis as a new genus and species of dinosaur based on these fossil remains, establishing ZJZ-183 as the holotype specimen. They identified the bone as belonging to an ankylosaur of uncertain affinities, noting the inability to assign it to a more exclusive clade (i.e., Nodosauridae or Ankylosauridae). The generic name, Sinankylosaurus, combines Sinae, a reference to China, with the generic name of the roughly coeval Ankylosaurus, in turn derived from the Greek words agkylos, meaning 'bent' or 'fused', and σαῦρος (sauros), meaning 'lizard'. The specific name, zhuchengensis, references the discovery of the specimen in Zhucheng.

In 2021 publication, Wenjie Zheng and colleagues described a partial ilium from the Albian–Cenomanian-aged Longjing Formation of Jilin Province, China. These researchers noted several diagnostic ankylosaurian traits in this bone, allowing its confident referral to Anyklosauria. In their publication, Zheng et al. noted that they were unable recognize any anatomical characters in the ilium of Sinankylosaurus uniting it with the Ankylosauria. As such, they regarded it as a non-ankylosaurian nomen dubium, lacking diagnostic characters.

== Paleoecology ==
Sinankylosaurus is known from the Hongtuya Formation, part of the Wangshi Group of southern China. Other dinosaurs from this group include ceratopsians (Ischioceratops, Sinoceratops, and Zhuchengceratops), the large hadrosaurid Shantungosaurus, the titanosaur Zhuchengtitan, the tyrannosaurid Zhuchengtyrannus, and the oviraptorosaur Anomalipes.
