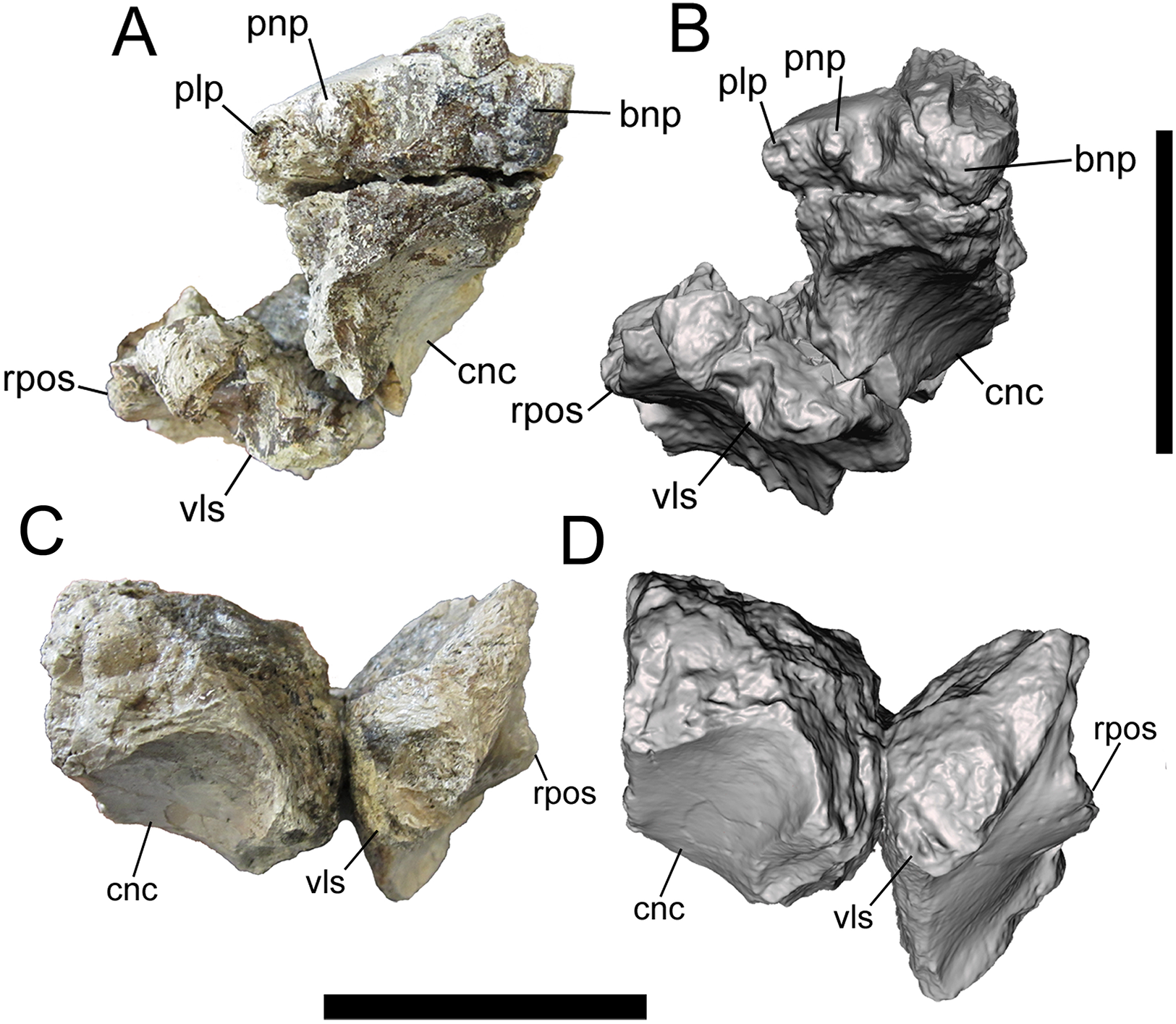
- Frontal bones in front view

Scientific classification
- Kingdom: Animalia
- Phylum: Chordata
- Class: Reptilia
- Clade: Dinosauria
- Clade: Saurischia
- Clade: Theropoda
- Superfamily: †Tyrannosauroidea
- Family: †Tyrannosauridae
- Subfamily: †Tyrannosaurinae
- Tribe: †Teratophoneini
- Genus: †Dynamoterror; McDonald et al., 2018

Type species
- †Dynamoterror dynastes McDonald et al., 2018

= Dynamoterror =

Dynamoterror Temporal range: Late Cretaceous, 83–78 Ma

Extinct genus of dinosaurs

Dynamoterror (meaning "powerful terror") is a monospecific genus of tyrannosaurid dinosaur from New Mexico that lived during the Late Cretaceous (lower Campanian age, 78 Ma) in what is now the upper Allison Member of the Menefee Formation. The type and only species, Dynamoterror dynastes, is known from a subadult or adult individual about 9 metres (30 feet) long with an incomplete associated skeleton. It was named in 2018 by Andrew T. McDonald, Douglas G. Wolfe and Alton C. Dooley, Jr. Dynamoterror was closely related to Teratophoneus and Lythronax.

== Discovery ==
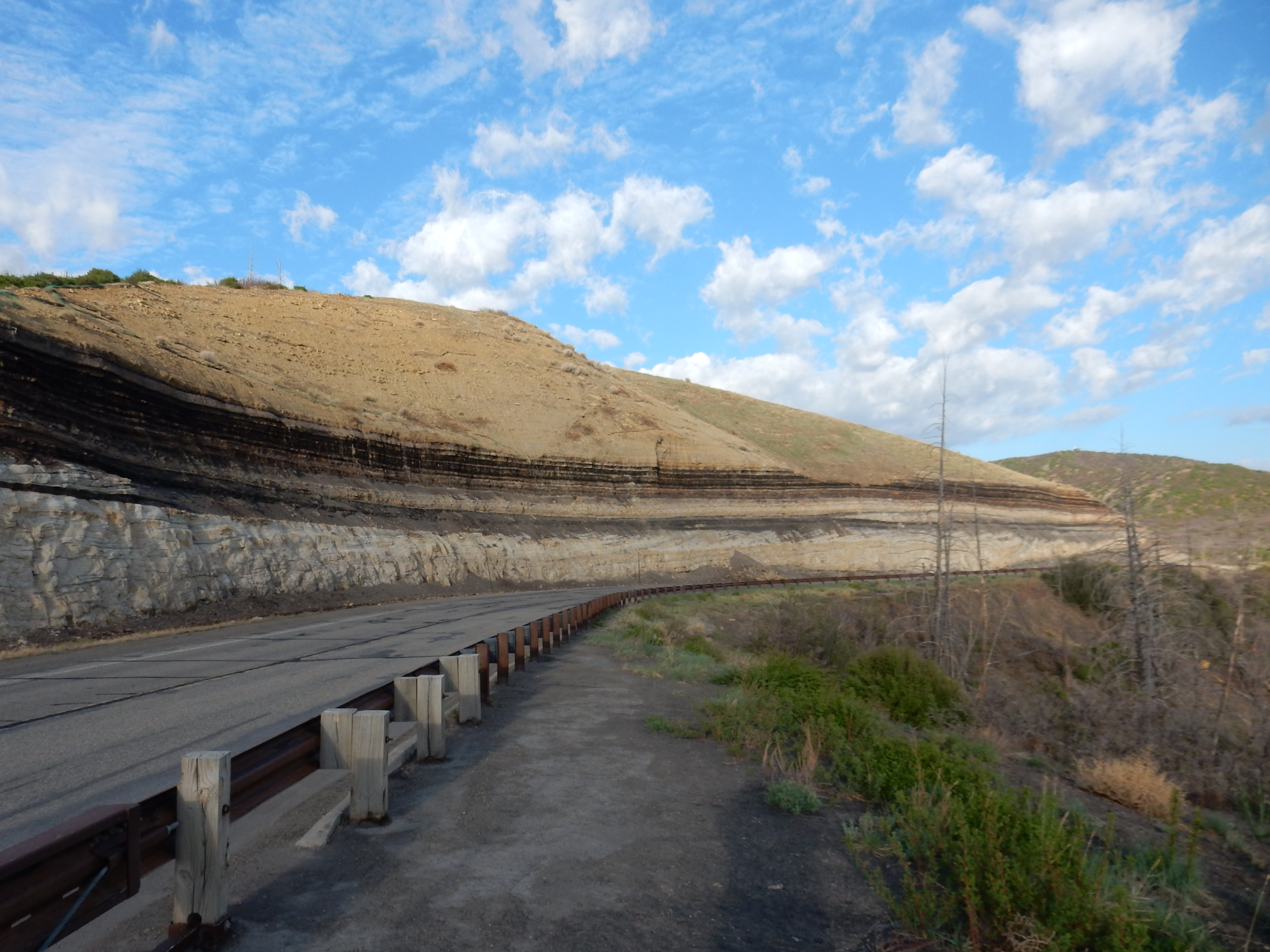
Menefee Formation in Colorado.

In August 2012, a partial skeleton of a tyrannosaurid was discovered and collected from the Lower Campanian Allison Member of the Menefee Formation in the San Juan Basin of northwestern New Mexico. The remains were found by geology students Brian Watkins and Eric Gutiérrez on an expedition led by Andrew McDonald of the Western Science Center, and Douglas Wolfe, the CEO of the Zuni Dinosaur Institute for Geosciences. Subsequent expeditions at the Menefee Formation in 2013 and 2018 did not reveal any additional elements. The specimen was subsequently named and described in 2018 by Andrew T. McDonald, Douglas G. Wolfe, and Alton C. Dooley, Jr. The holotype specimen, UMNH VP 28348, consists of the left and right frontals, fragmentary vertebral centra, fragments of dorsal ribs, right metacarpal II, the supraacetabular crest of the right ilium, phalanx 2 of left pedal digit IV, phalanx 4 of left pedal digit IV, and other unidentifiable bone fragments. The holotype specimen is currently housed at the Natural History Museum of Utah in Salt Lake City, Utah.

The generic name, Dynamoterror, is derived from the Greek word "dynamis" (power) and the Latin word "terror". The specific name, dynastes, is derived from the Latin word "dynastēs" (ruler). The binomial name honours "Dynamosaurus imperiosus", a junior synonym of Tyrannosaurus, as it had been a "childhood favourite" of one of the authors.

In 2020, Chan-gyu Yun considered Dynamoterror as a nomen dubium because of the highly fragmentary nature of the holotype specimen and lack of autapomorphies, as two of the original autapomorphies are present in other tyrannosaurids. Additionally, the fragmentary nature of the frontal makes it uncertain whether the autapomorphies are even comparable to other tyrannosaurids.

In 1993, Adrian P. Hunt and Spencer G. Lucas reported tooth fragments and a metatarsal of a tyrannosaurid from the Menefee Formation. In 2006, Lewis et al. reported another tooth fragment. McDonald et al. (2018) suggested that, due to the lack of overlapping material, the previously reported tyrannosaurid material could not be referred to Dynamoterror. In 2018, Sebastian G. Dalman and Spencer G. Lucas described five tyrannosaurid specimens from the Menefee Formation: NMMNH P-8313 (a right anterior scapula), NMMNH P-22133 (a metatarsal II), NMMNH P-61274 (a shaft of an anterior thoracic rib), NMMNH P-71332 (a lateral tooth), and NMMNH P-78032 (a left postorbital).

A more complete specimen of Dynamoterror was identified in 2021, but has not yet been described in detail. It is known as specimen WSC 1027 and is also from the Menefee Formation. A detailed description of this specimen is ongoing as of 2024.

== Description ==
=== Size and distinguishing traits ===
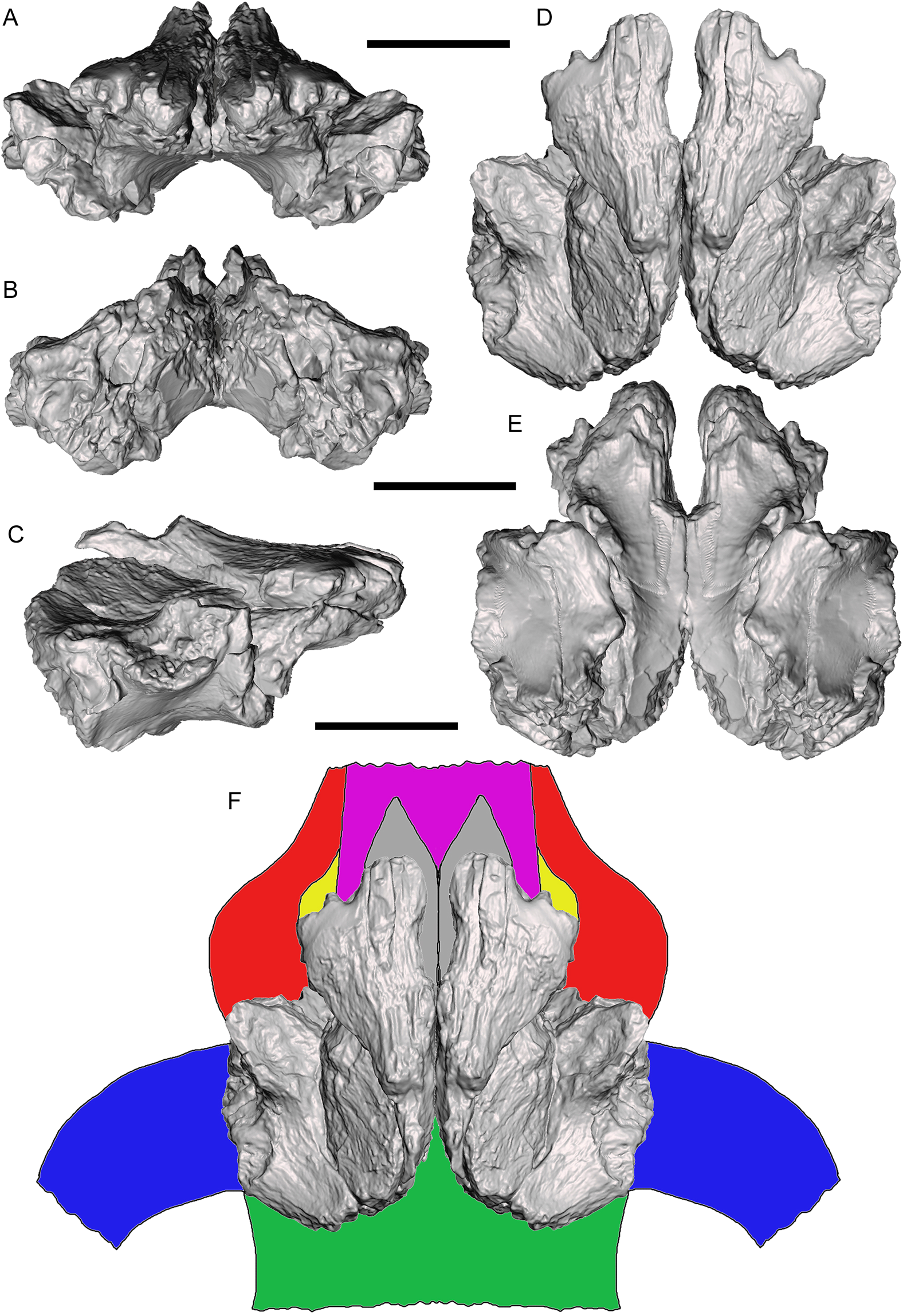
Reconstructed frontal complex

Based on a specimen of a subadult Tyrannosaurus, LACM 23845, the holotype specimen of Dynamoterror had a similar body length of 9 metres (30 feet).

McDonald et al. (2018) originally diagnosed Dynamoterror based on the prefrontonasal and prefrontolacrimal processes being in close proximity to each other, separated only by a shallow notch, and the presence of a subrectangular, concave, laterally-projecting caudal part of the postorbital suture, separated from the rostral part by a deep groove. However, they noted that the second diagnostic trait should be provisional, given the ontogenetic variation observed in the postorbital suture in other tyrannosaurids.

=== Cranium ===
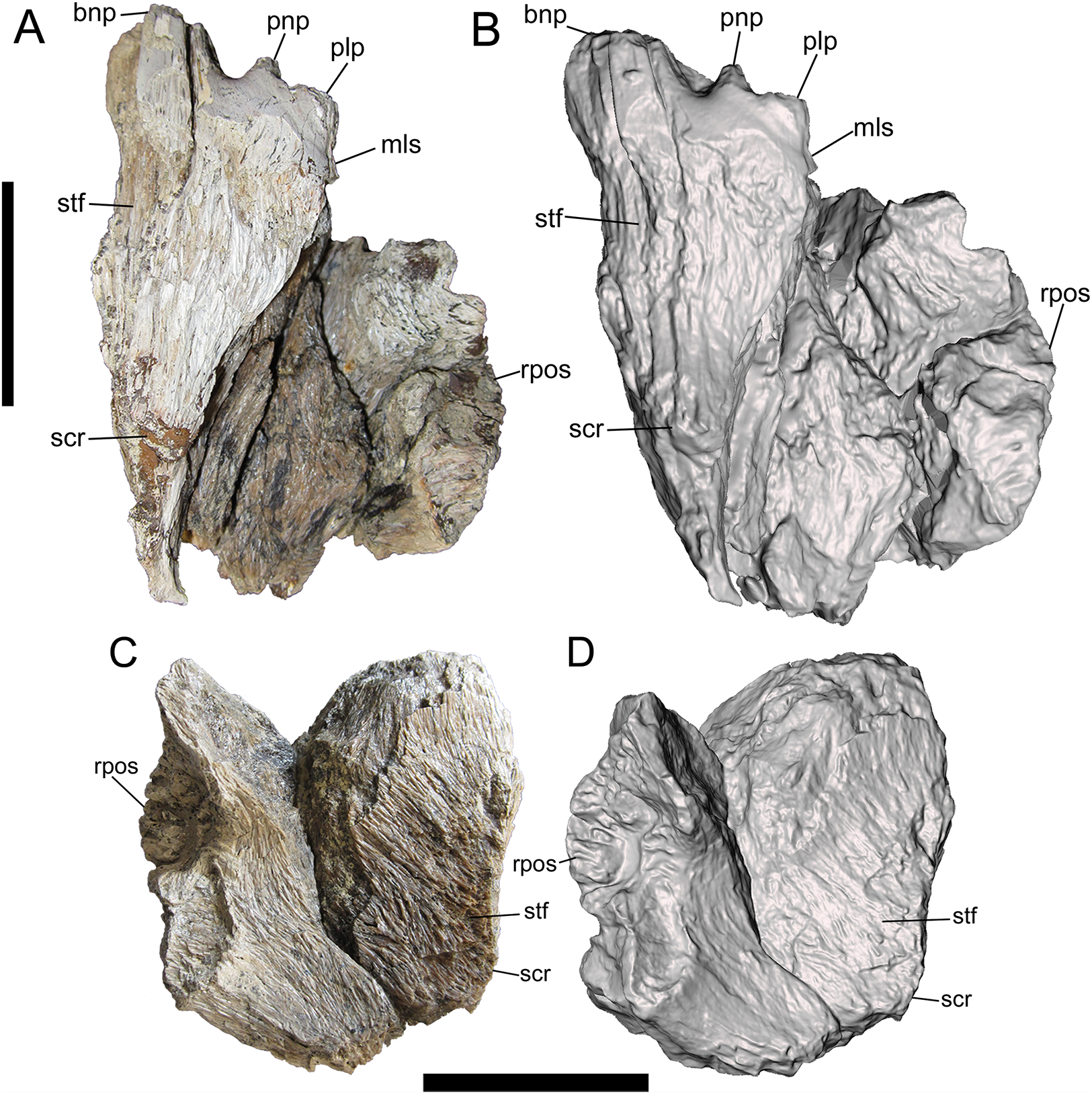
Frontals in dorsal view.

The measurements and depth/width ratio of the frontals suggests that the holotype specimen of Dynamoterror represents a subadult or adult individual. The base of the nasal process consists of the medial-most feature on the rostral surface of the frontal. The nasal process projects towards the rostrum and possesses a deep notch towards the sides of the base. The deep notch marks the posterior-most point of the contact with the nasal. As in Teratophoneus and Lythronax, towards the sides of the deep notch is the conical prefrontonasal process. Towards the sides of the prefrontal process is a shallower notch that marks where the prefrontal exposure is on the skull roof and towards the side of the shallow notch is the prefrontolacrimal process. The prefrontolacrimal process differs from that of Nanuqsaurus and Teratophoneus by its smaller size, but is similar to that of Lythronax, Daspletosaurus, Tyrannosaurus, and Tarbosaurus. The close proximity of the prefrontonasal and prefrontolacrimal processes, separated by a shallow notch, is a unique trait of Dynamoterror. Towards the sides of the prefrontolacrimal process is a smooth surface that extends towards the back and then begins to curve towards the sides, which marks the medial-most point of the lacrimal suture. Towards the sides of the smooth surface is ventrolateral portion of the lacrimal suture that forms a rostrally facing cup-like structure that is as rostrally concave and ventrolaterally convex, as in Lythronax, Daspletosaurus, Tyrannosaurus, Tarbosaurus, and Nanuqsaurus.

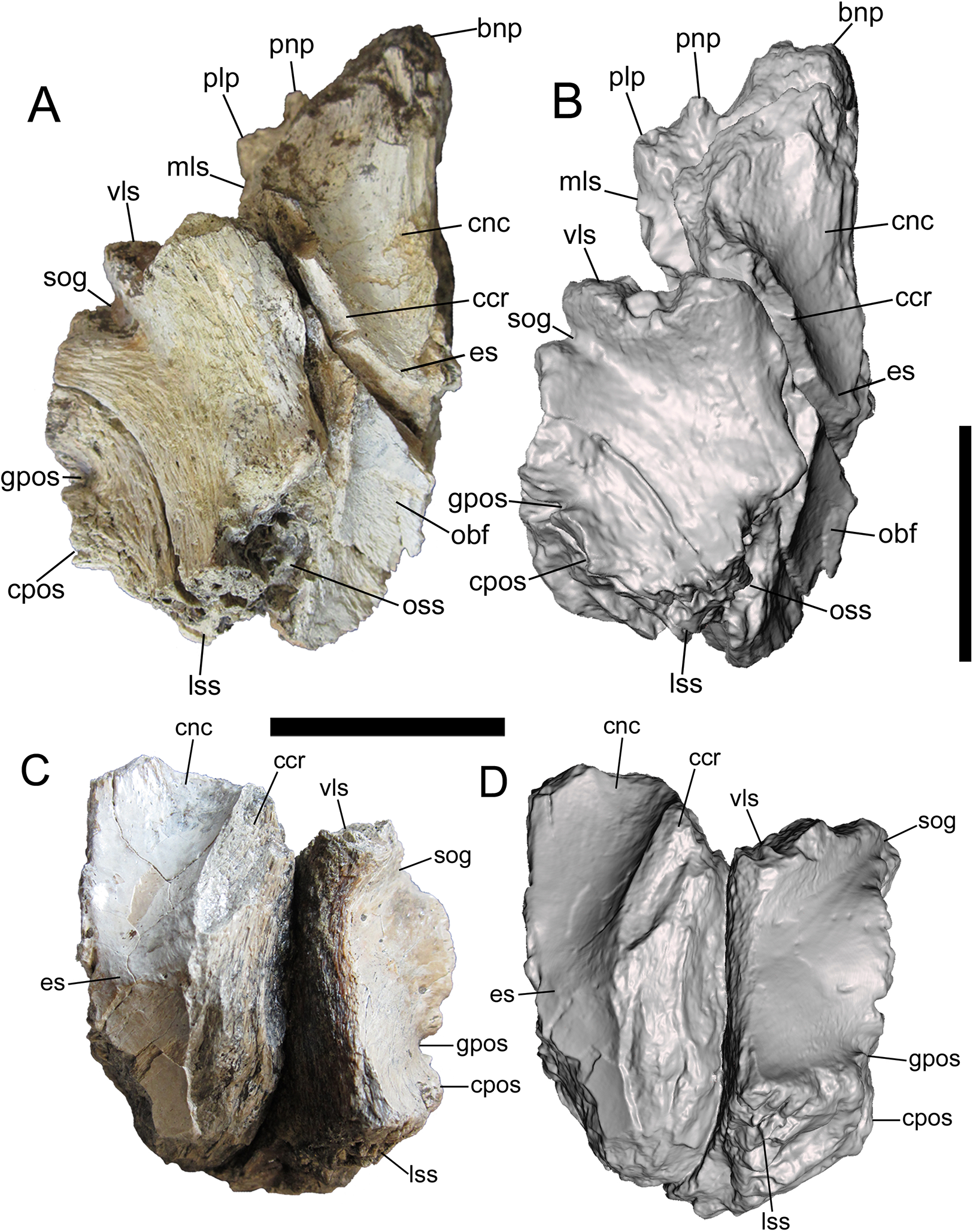
Frontals in ventral view.

The right frontal's dorsal surface possesses a slight swelling posterior to the nasal, prefrontonasal, and prefrontolacrimal processes. Towards the rear of the swelling, the dorsal surface becomes concave and begins to slope towards the rear and sides to form the frontal portion of the supratemporal fossa. The dorsal surface rises towards the rear and the middle to form the frontal portion of the sagittal crest, which would have been very tall. Such a prominent sagittal crest is also seen in Teratophoneus, Lythronax, Bistahieversor, and an unnamed tyrannosaurine from the Aguja Formation of Texas. The tall sagittal crest of Dynamoterror and other tyrannosaurines differs from that of albertosaurines, such as Albertosaurus and Gorgosaurus, as both have much lower sagittal crests on the frontals. The large supratemporal fossae and tall sagittal crest on the frontals provide an expanded attachment area for large jaw-closing muscles. The rostral region of the ventral surface is covered by an elongated and wide fossa that is defined towards the rostrum by the prefrontal suture, towards the middle by the interfrontal suture, towards the sides by the crista cranii, and towards the rear by the ethmoid scar. The fossae form the rear extent of the olfactory region of the nasal cavity, which would have been lined with a mucous membrane in life. The ethmoid scar separates the rostral fossa from the olfactory bulb fossa. The orbitosphenoid suture is lined with a set of ridges, bumps, and depressions.

The medial surface of the frontal possesses a vertical interfrontal suture that consists of a series of overlapping, V-shaped ridges. A narrow, deep, vertical groove separates the lacrimal and postorbital sutures, as in Lythronax, Teratophoneus, and Albertosaurus. The postorbital suture is composed of a rostral part and a caudal part. The rostral part possesses an abdominal margin that is convex and projects farther towards the sides than the upper side margin. Towards the underside of the rostral part is the orbit wall. Both the rostral and caudal parts are separated by a deep, inclined groove that opens towards the underside onto the orbital wall. This inclined groove is present on both frontals. The caudal part of the postorbital suture is subrectangular and slightly concave, which is unique to Dynamoterror, but might be subject to ontogenetic variation.

=== Postcrania ===
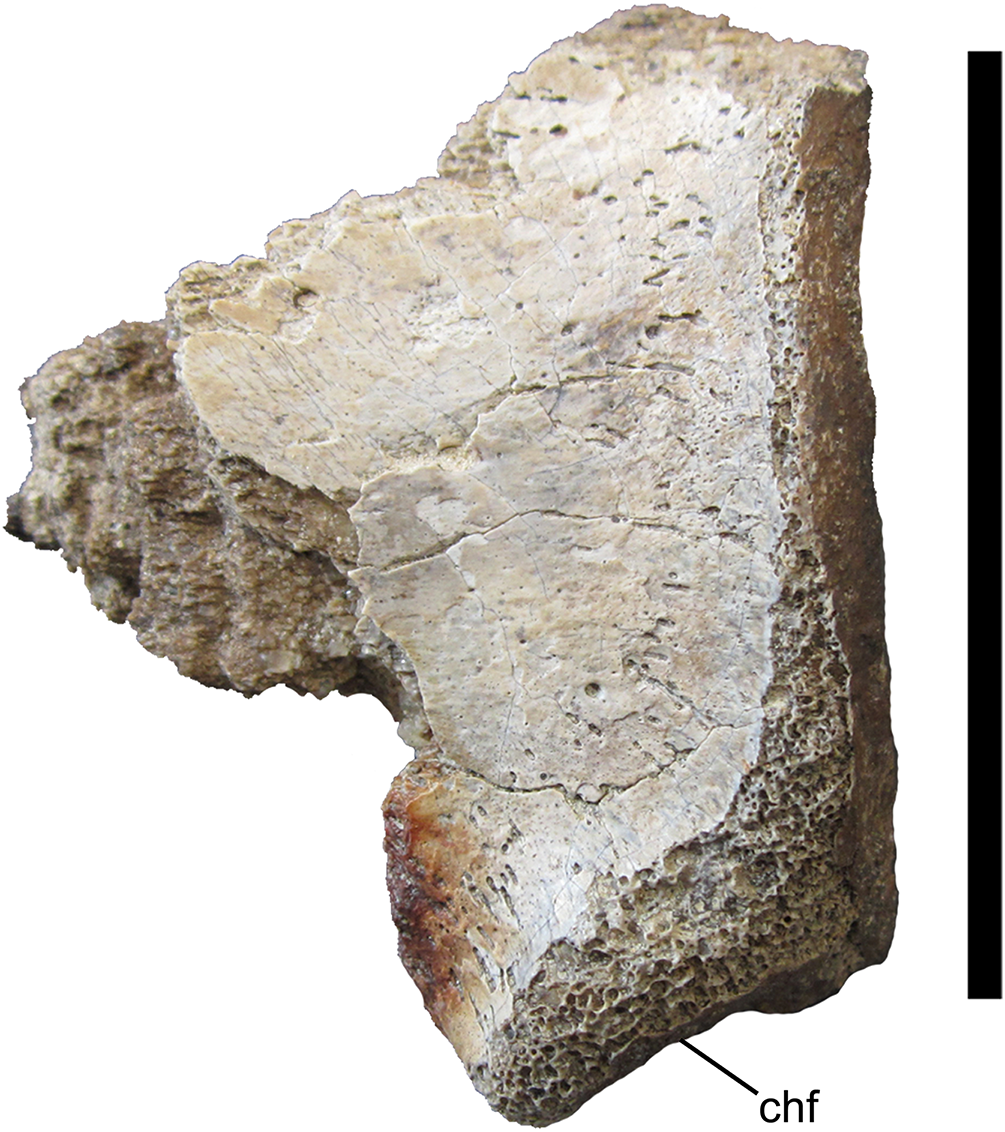
Centrum of a middle tail vertebra.

One of the most complete vertebral fragments of Dynamoterror is known to be part of the centrum of a middle caudal vertebra. As in Tyrannosaurus, the middle caudal centrum exhibits a pronounced chevron articulation facet. The articulation facet is offset from the underside margin of the caudal face of the centrum. Based on comparisons of the ilia of Teratophoneus and Tyrannosaurus, a broadly arched bone fragment was identified as the supraacetabular crest of the right ilium. The underside surface of the right ilium fragment is smooth and gently concave. The supraacetabular crest is very thin at the side margins, but becomes considerably thicker towards the rear and middle, as its upper margin slopes steeply dorsally to merge with the side surface of the blade of the ilium.

Based on the right manus of Tyrannosaurus and the left manus of Daspletosaurus, the right metacarpal II was identified. The right metacarpal II is nearly straight and the articular surface nearest to the centre tapers and curves towards its upper side margin. The underside surface of the metacarpal II shaft is flat and becomes wider towards the distal articular surface. The metacarpal II does not have an apparent articulation surface on the side surfaces, while the medial surface is broad and gently concave. The broadness and concave shape of the medial surface of the metacarpal II forms a surface for articulation with the side surfaces of metacarpal I. Pedal digit IV-2 has a proximal articular surface that is subrectangular and divided into two facets by a ridge. Away from the centre of the proximal articular surface, the shaft of pedal digit IV-2 is constricted towards the middle and sides and towards the upper side and sides. A deep circular pit with a pronounced bump is present on the underside of the medial surface of the shaft. In comparison to pedal digit IV-2, pedal digit IV-4 is smaller in all dimensions. The proximal articular surface of pedal digit IV-4 is similarly divided as pedal digit IV-2. However, the facets of IV-4 are equal in size and are separated by a distinct ridge. The distal articular surface possesses a much deeper trochlea than on IV-2 that separates the medial and lateral condyles. The lateral condyle is deeper towards the upper and under side than the medial condyle and both of them bear a deep circular fovea.

== Classification ==
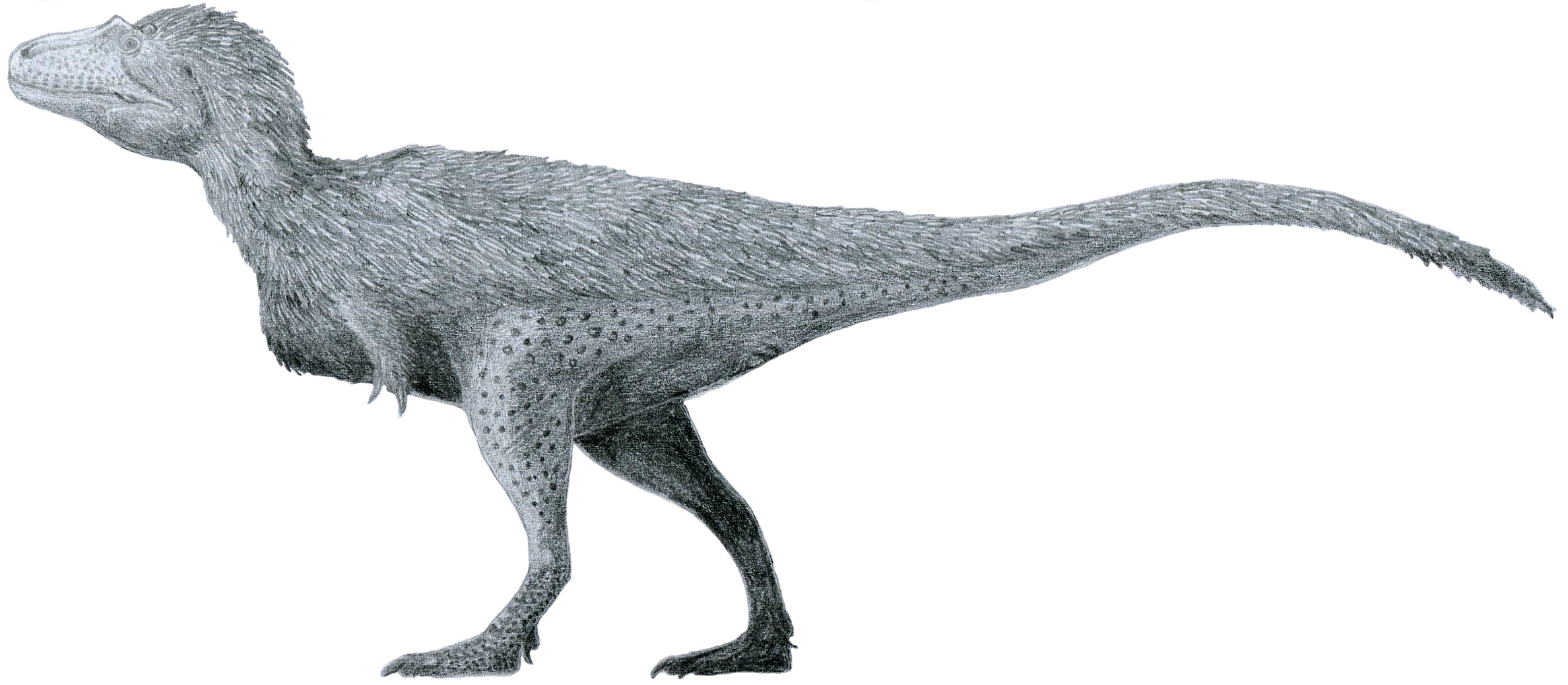
Life restoration of Lythronax, a close relative of Dynamoterror.

McDonald et al. (2018) originally placed Dynamoterror within Tyrannosaurinae, in a polytomy with Lythronax, Nanuqsaurus, Teratophoneus, Daspletosaurus, Zhuchengtyrannus, and a clade containing Tarbosaurus and Tyrannosaurus. The authors suggested that the polytomy was likely caused by the fragmentary nature of the holotype specimen of Dynamoterror. The authors also suggested that the area of origin for the large-bodied tyrannosaurine clade is difficult to determine due to the small amount of tyrannosauroid specimens known from the Campanian of Asia and the lack of diagnostic early tyrannosaurid material from northern Laramidia. However, Voris et al. (2020) later assigned Dynamoterror within a clade containing Teratophoneus and Lythronax only. The authors suggested that this clade likely had different feeding strategies to tyrannosaurids belonging to the clade Daspletosaurini because of the differing skull morphologies. A study by Yun (2020) determined Dynamoterror to be a nomen dubium due to the holotype's undiagnostic, fragmentary nature.

A phylogenetic analysis conducted by Voris et al. (2020) is reproduced below.

- Eutyrannosauria
  - - Dryptosaurus aquilunguis
    - - Appalachiosaurus montgomeriensis
      - - Bistahieversor sealeyi
        - - Tyrannosauridae
            - Albertosaurinae
              - Gorgosaurus libratus
              - Albertosaurus sarcophagus
            - Tyrannosaurinae
              - Alioramini
                - Qianzhousaurus sinensis
                - - Alioramus remotus
                  - Alioramus altai
              - - - Teratophoneus curriei
                  - Dynamoterror dynastes
                  - Lythronax argestes
                - - Nanuqsaurus hoglundi
                  - - - Daspletosaurini
                        - Thanatotheristes degrootorum
                        - - Daspletosaurus torosus
                          - Daspletosaurus horneri
                      - - Zhuchengtyrannus magnus
                        - - Tarbosaurus bataar
                          - Tyrannosaurus rex

The results of an earlier analysis by McDonald et al. (2018) are reproduced below.

- Tyrannosauridae
  - Albertosaurinae
    - Albertosaurus sarcophagus
    - Gorgosaurus libratus
  - Tyrannosaurinae
    - Alioramini
      - Qianzhousaurus sinensis
      - - Alioramus remotus
        - Alioramus altai
    - - Lythronax argestes
      - Dynamoterror dynastes
      - Nanuqsaurus hoglundi
      - Teratophoneus curriei
      - Daspletosaurus torosus
      - Daspletosaurus horneri
      - Zhuchengtyrannus magnus
      - - Tarbosaurus bataar
        - Tyrannosaurus rex

== Paleoecology ==
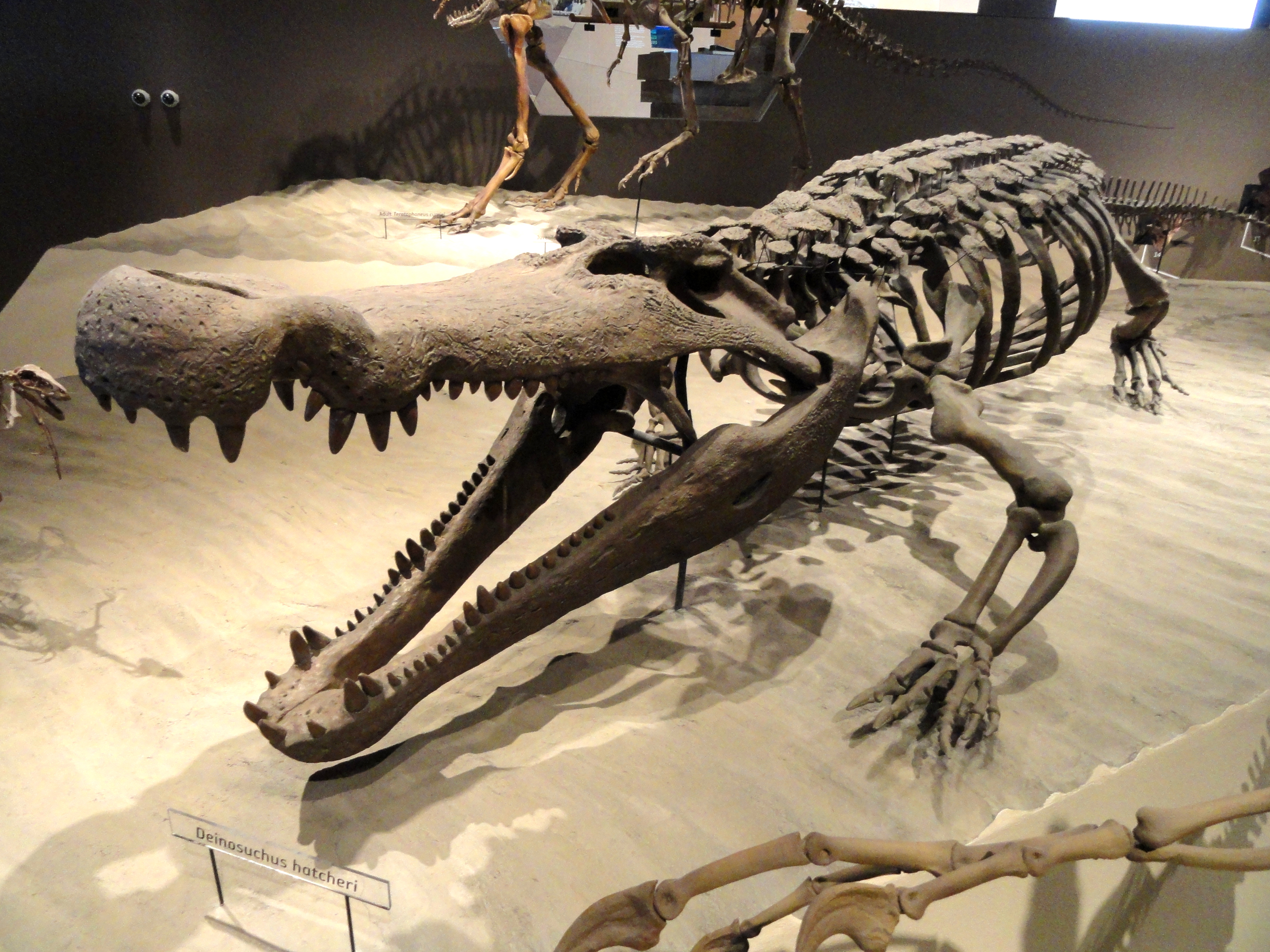
Deinosuchus, an alligatoroid crocodilian contemporaneous with Dynamoterror.

Dynamoterror is known from the upper Allison Member of the Menefee Formation which has been dated to the lower Campanian age, about 78.5 Ma. The Menefee Formation represents a widespread alluvial floodplain and consists of mudstone, siltstone, sandstone, and coal. The sandstones that compose the Menefee Formation are fixed within carbonaceous shales of coastal swamp or lagoon origin and are thought to have been created by flood tidal deltas that ran north and east across New Mexico and towards the retreating Western Interior Seaway.

Dynamoterror was contemporaneous with an indeterminate ankylosaur, the indeterminate nodosaurid Invictarx, an indeterminate hadrosaurid, the centrosaurine ceratopsid Menefeeceratops, the brachylophosaurin hadrosaurid Ornatops, an indeterminate tyrannosaurid, and a dromaeosaurid similar to Saurornitholestes. Non-dinosaur taxa contemporaneous with Dynamoterror include an indeterminate crocodylian, the alligatoroids Brachychampsa and Deinosuchus, an indeterminate baenid turtle, an indeterminate turtle, and an indeterminate trionychid turtle.

== See also ==
- 2018 in paleontology
- Timeline of tyrannosaur research
