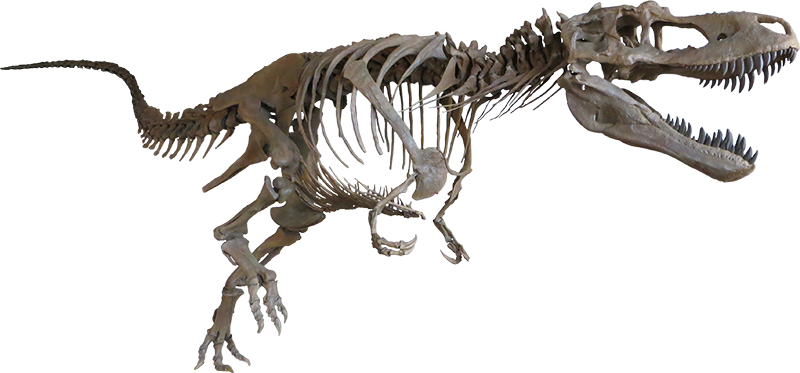
- Skeletal mount of Daspletosaurus torosus

Scientific classification
- Kingdom: Animalia
- Phylum: Chordata
- Clade: Dinosauria
- Clade: Saurischia
- Clade: Theropoda
- Superfamily: †Tyrannosauroidea
- Family: †Tyrannosauridae
- Subfamily: †Tyrannosaurinae
- Tribe: †Daspletosaurini; Voris et al., 2020

Type species
- Daspletosaurus torosus Russell, 1970

Genera
- †Daspletosaurus; †Thanatotheristes

= Daspletosaurini =

Daspletosaurins Temporal range: Late Cretaceous, middle Campanian 80.1–75 Ma

Extinct clade of tyrannosaurid dinosaurs

Daspletosaurini is an extinct clade (tribe) of tyrannosaurine dinosaurs that lived in Laramidia during the Late Cretaceous (Middle Campanian) period. It consists of two genera: Daspletosaurus and Thanatotheristes. Four species have been described in the two genera, namely Daspletosaurus torosus, Daspletosaurus horneri, Daspletosaurus wilsoni, and Thanatotheristes degrootorum. At one point all of them were assigned as specimens of D. torosus, but several papers since 2017 have found them to represent distinct species. Some researchers found anagenesis in the group, whether contained in a daspletosaurin clade or paraphyletic in respect to the lineage of tyrannosaurines leading up to Tyrannosaurus, but a 2023 study refuted this theory on the basis of morphological and stratigraphical data.

== Description ==
Size of four daspletosaurin species compared to a human

Daspletosaurins were large predators, reaching around 9 metres (30 ft) in length. However, they were not the largest tyrannosaurids, as more derived taxa, such as Tyrannosaurus, could reach lengths of more than 12 metres (39 ft).

Daspletosaurini is diagnosed by characteristics such as the presence of an extremely coarse subcutaneous surface of the maxilla anteroventral to the antorbital fossa; a constricted jugal ramus of maxilla; the anteroventral corner of the maxilla tapers into a shallow angle (<65°) as measured between the alveolar margin of the first two alveoli and the anterior margin of the subcutaneous surface; a prefrontal that is broad in dorsal view and strongly dorsomedially arced in anterior view; a dentary chin located ventral to either the third alveolus or third interdental plate and possessing no fewer than 14 maxillary teeth.

== Classification ==
In the 2020 description of Thanatotheristes, Voris et al. erected Daspletosaurini as a new clade within Tyrannosauridae, as a sister taxon to a clade comprising Zhuchengtyrannus, Tarbosaurus, and Tyrannosaurus. The cladogram below shows the results of the phylogenetic analyses performed by Voris et al. (2020):

- Tyrannosauridae
  - Albertosaurinae
    - Gorgosaurus
    - Albertosaurus
  - Tyrannosaurinae
    - Alioramini
      - Qianzhousaurus
      - - Alioramus remotus
        - Alioramus altai
    - - - Teratophoneus
        - Dynamoterror
        - Lythronax
      - - Nanuqsaurus
        - - - Daspletosaurini
              - Thanatotheristes
              - - Daspletosaurus torosus
                - Daspletosaurus horneri
            - - Zhuchengtyrannus
              - - Tarbosaurus
                - Tyrannosaurus

In 2022, Warshaw & Fowler proposed that the three Daspletosaurus species evolved through anagenesis in the Tyrannosaurinae in a line leading to Zhuchengtyrannus, Tarbosaurus, and Tyrannosaurus. Due to their more fragmentary nature, Thanatotheristes and Nanuqsaurus were excluded from this analysis. The cladogram below shows the results of the phylogenetic analysis performed by Warshaw & Fowler (2022).

- Tyrannosaurinae
  - - Alioramus remotus
    - - Alioramus altai
      - Qianzhousaurus
  - - - Dynamoterror
      - - Teratophoneus
        - Lythronax
    - - Daspletosaurus torosus
      - - Daspletosaurus wilsoni
        - - Daspletosaurus horneri
          - - Zhuchengtyrannus
            - - Tarbosaurus
              - Tyrannosaurus

In 2023, Scherer and Voiculescu-Holvad argued that the stratigraphic ranges of D. torosus, D. wilsoni and an unnamed species from the Dinosaur Park Formation and Oldman Formation show a clear overlap, indicating that anagenesis may not be the predominant factor of speciation within the genus, since all species of Daspletosaurus were contemporaneous with each other at some point during its evolution. Phylogenetic analyses resolved D. horneri as the most basal species, in spite of the fact that it's stratigraphically the youngest. While the authors did not completely refute the possibility that anagenesis was the main driver of Daspletosaurus evolution based on the intermediate morphological features, they also suggested that D. wilsoni may be a junior synonym of D. torosus, since there is a near lack of autapomorphic characters that can differentiate this species. They also claimed that Daspletosaurus did not evolve from Thanatotheristes, since they found no support on the basis of morphological and stratigraphical data, and that anagenesis will not be supported unequivocally due to the limited sample and nature of the fossil record which doesn't show a great degree of variation in morphology. The cladogram presented for their phylogenetic analysis is shown below.

- Tyrannosaurinae
  - Alioramini
    - Alioramus remotus
    - - Alioramus altai
      - Qianzhousaurus
  - - Teratophoneini
      - - Lythronax
        - Teratophoneus
      - Dynamoterror
    - - Daspletosaurini
        - Thanatotheristes
        - - Daspletosaurus horneri
          - - Daspletosaurus wilsoni
            - - Daspletosaurus torosus
              - Dinosaur Park and Oldman formations taxon (TMP 2001.36.1)
      - Tyrannosaurini
        - Zhuchengtyrannus
        - - Tarbosaurus
          - Tyrannosaurus
