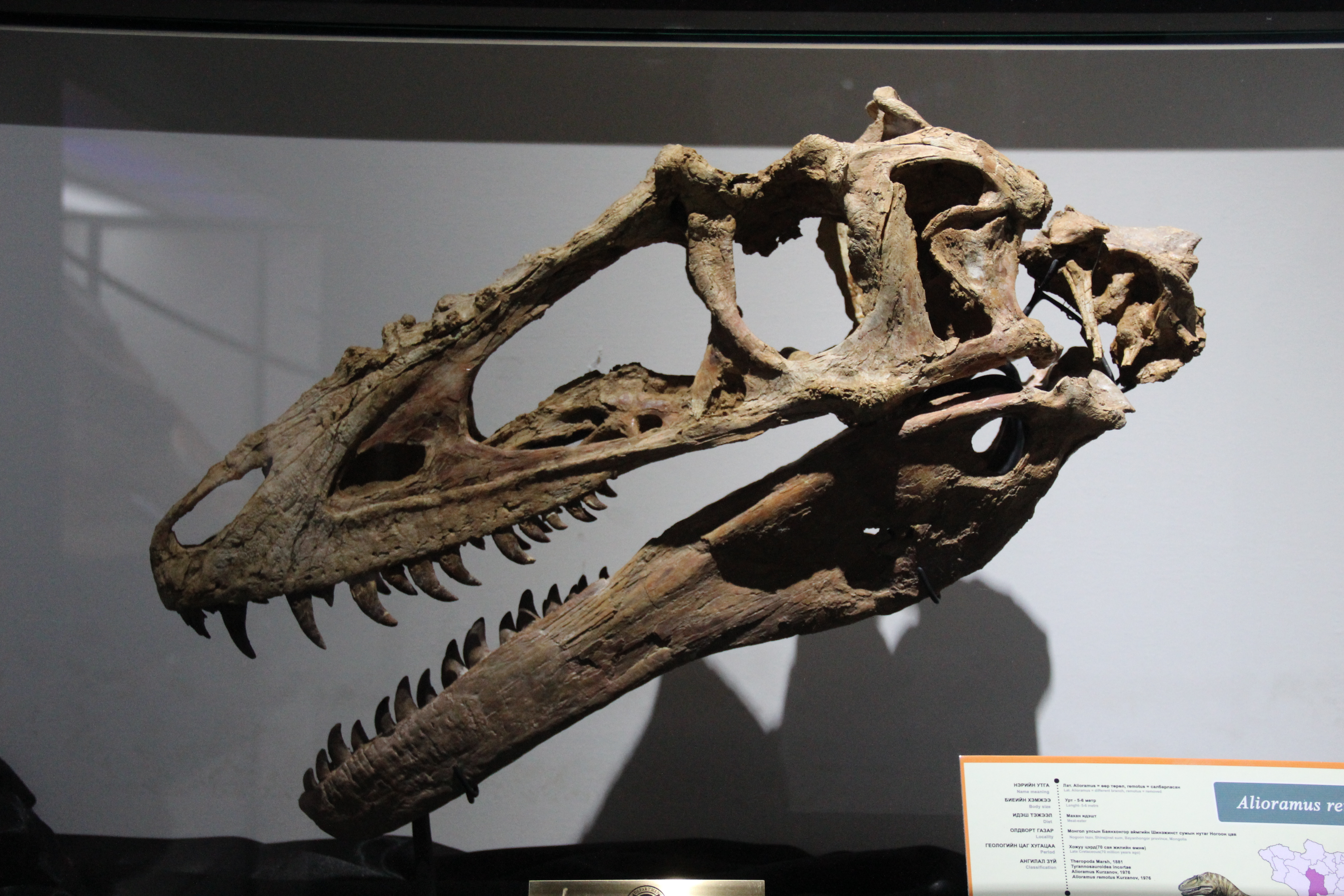
- Skull of Alioramus
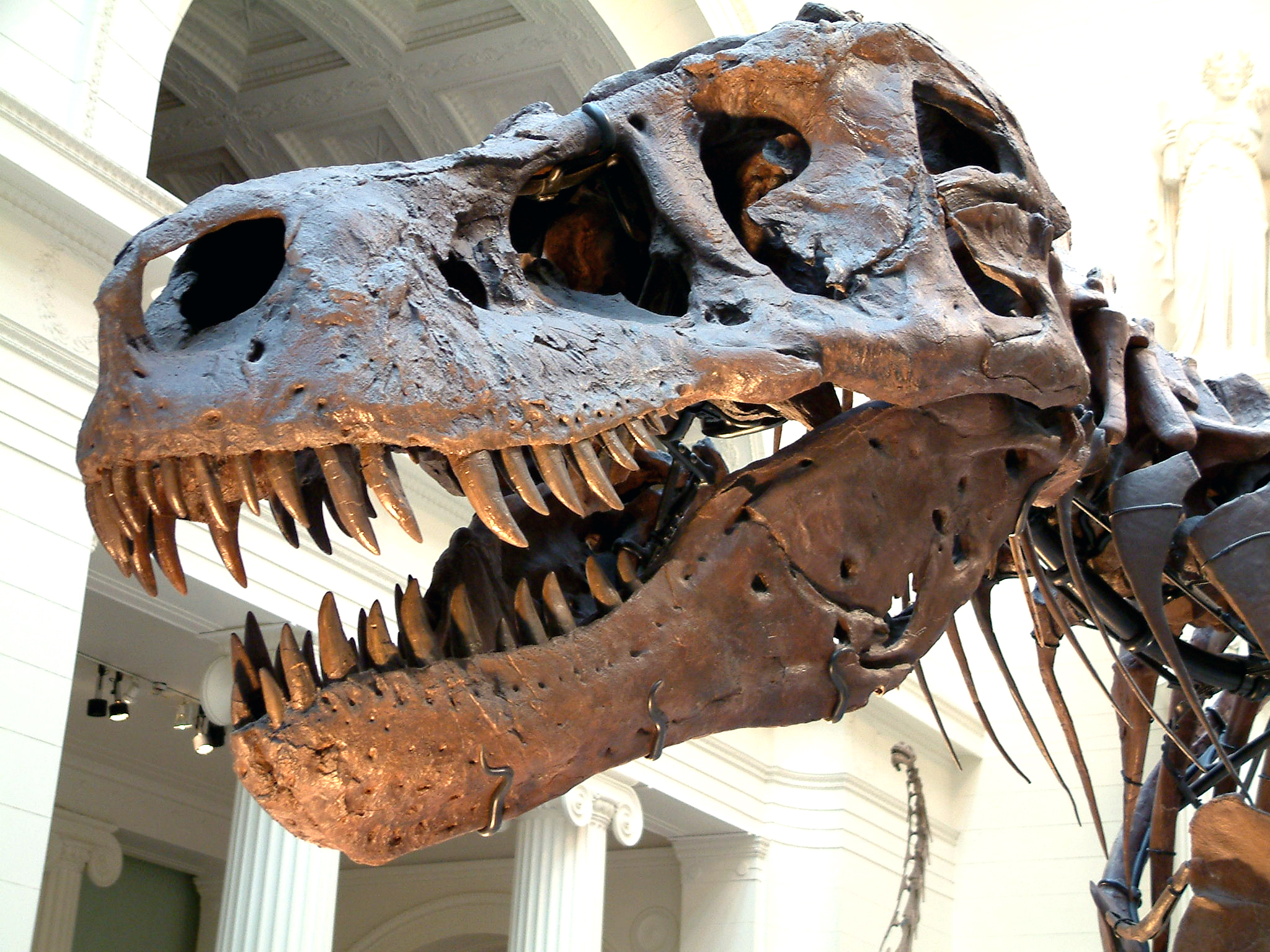
- Skull of Tyrannosaurus

Scientific classification
- Kingdom: Animalia
- Phylum: Chordata
- Class: Reptilia
- Clade: Dinosauria
- Clade: Saurischia
- Clade: Theropoda
- Superfamily: †Tyrannosauroidea
- Family: †Tyrannosauridae
- Subfamily: †Tyrannosaurinae; Osborn, 1906

Type genus
- †Tyrannosaurus Osborn, 1905

Subgroups
- †Asiatyrannus; †Nanuqsaurus; †Raptorex?; †Alioramini?; †Alioramus; †Qianzhousaurus; †Daspletosaurini; †Daspletosaurus; †Thanatotheristes; †Teratophoneini Scherer & Voiculescu-Holvad, 2023; †Bistahieversor?; †Dynamoterror; †Labocania?; †Lythronax; †Teratophoneus; †Tyrannosaurini Olshevsky, Ford & Yamamoto, 1995; †Tarbosaurus; †Tyrannosaurus; †Zhuchengtyrannus

= Tyrannosaurinae =

Tyrannosaurinae Temporal range: Late Cretaceous, 81.9–66 Ma (possible Cenomanian occurrence of Labocania)

Extinct subfamily of dinosaurs

Tyrannosaurinae (or tyrannosaurines) is one of the two extinct subfamilies of Tyrannosauridae, a family of coelurosaurian theropods that consists of at least three tribes and several genera. All fossils of these genera have been found in the Late Cretaceous deposits of western North America and east Asia. Compared to the related subfamily Albertosaurinae, tyrannosaurines overall are more robust and larger though the alioramins were gracile by comparison. This subfamily also includes Lythronax, one of the oldest known tyrannosaurid genera, as well as the youngest and most famous member of the group, Tyrannosaurus rex.

== History of discovery ==
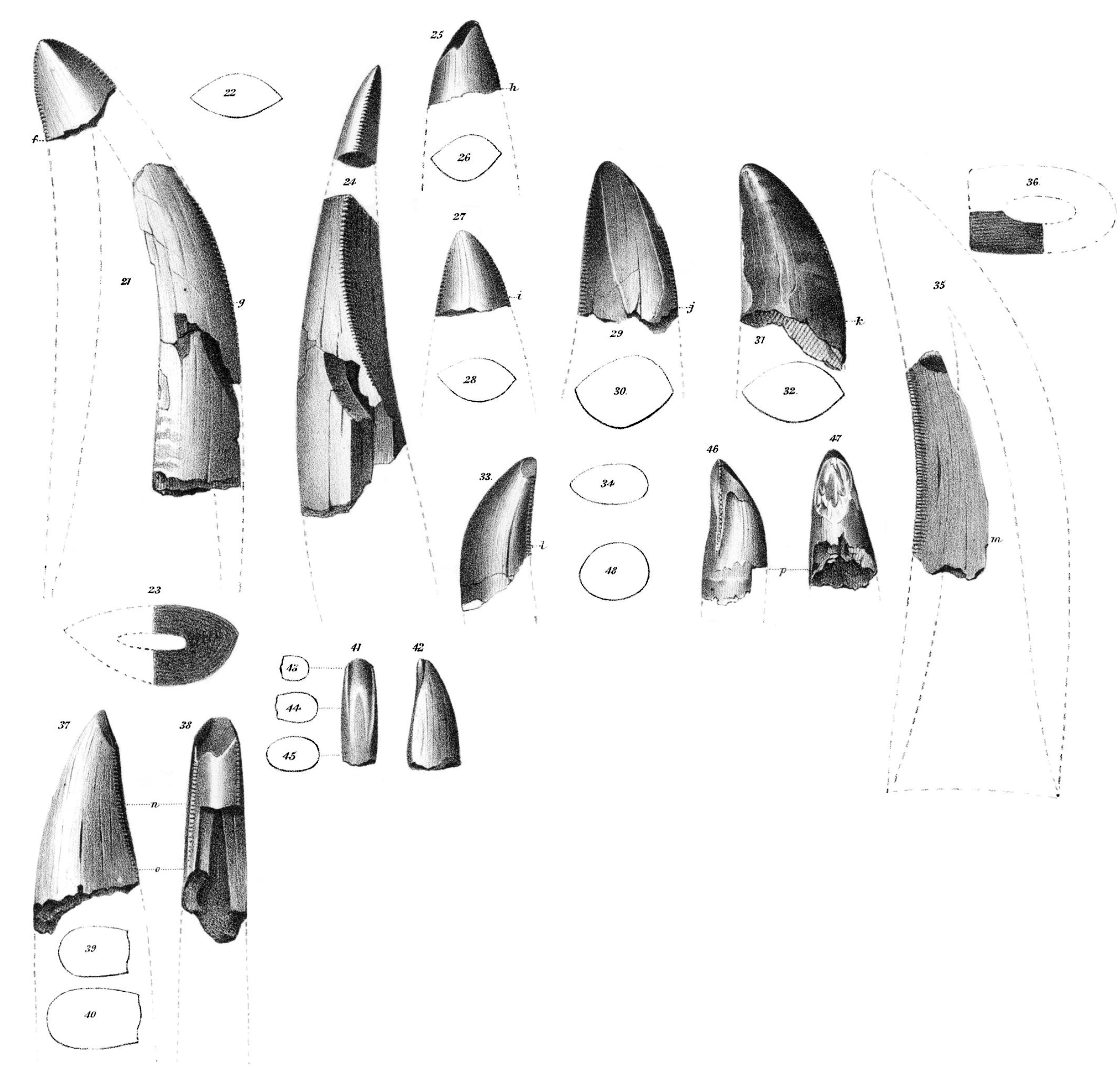
Deinodon teeth, the earliest known tyrannosaurid remains

The first remains of tyrannosaurids were uncovered during expeditions led by the Geological Survey of Canada, which located numerous scattered teeth. These distinctive dinosaur teeth were given the name Deinodon ("terrible tooth") by Joseph Leidy in 1856. In 1892 Edward Drinker Cope described more tyrannosaur material in the form of isolated vertebrae, and gave this animal the name Manospondylus gigas. This discovery was mostly overlooked for over a century, and caused controversy in the early 2000s when it was discovered that this material actually belonged to, and had name priority over, Tyrannosaurus rex. Later in 1905 Henry Fairfield Osborn described two tyrannosaur specimens that had been collected in Montana and Wyoming during a 1902 expedition of the American Museum of Natural History, led by Barnum Brown. Initially, Osborn considered these to be distinct species. The first, he named Dynamosaurus imperiosus ("emperor power lizard"), and the second, Tyrannosaurus rex ("king tyrant lizard"). A year later, Osborn recognized that these two specimens actually came from the same species. Despite the fact that Dynamosaurus had been found first, the name Tyrannosaurus had appeared one page earlier in his original article describing both specimens. Therefore, according to the International Code of Zoological Nomenclature (ICZN), the name Tyrannosaurus was used.

The second described representative of the tyrannosaurines, Tarbosaurus (originally described as an Asiatic representative of Tyrannosaurus) was in 1955 after a large skull was recovered in a joint Soviet-Mongolian expedition to the Gobi Desert in the Mongolian Ömnögovi Province in 1946. The holotype was named as Tyrannosaurus bataar by Evgeny Maleev as Tyrannosaurus bataar. The genus Tarbosaurus was also described in the same year based on PIN 551–2, a specimen with a skull and skeletal remains discovered by the same expedition in 1948 and 1949 as Tarbosaurus efremovi. It was only in 1965 that Ty. bataar and Ta. efremovi were the same species, the latter being a younger animal, and distinct from Tyrannosaurus recognized by A.K. Rozhdestvensky who recombined the species as Tarbosaurus bataar.

In the 1970s saw the description of two genera. In 1970 saw the publication of Daspletosaurus, with the holotype CMN 8506 consisting of a partial skeleton including the skull, the shoulder, a forelimb, the pelvis, a femur and all of the vertebrae from the neck, torso and hip, as well as the first eleven tail vertebrae. It was discovered in 1921 near Steveville, Alberta, by Charles Mortram Sternberg, who thought it was a new species of Gorgosaurus, but was found to be a new genus by Dale Russell using the aforementioned CMN 8506. The second, Alioramus, described in 1976 by Sergei Kurzanov which the holotype (PIN 3141/1) is a partial skull associated with three metatarsals found by a joint Soviet-Mongolian expedition to the Gobi Desert in the early 1970s found these remains at a locality known as Nogon-Tsav in the Mongolian province of Bayankhongor, Nemegt Formation.

From 1977 to 2009 saw the publications of several genera. In Asia they include Shanshanosaurus (1977), Maleevosaurus (1992), and Raptorex (2009), while in North America saw Nanotyrannus (1988), Dinotyrannus and Stygivenator (1995). These genera, however are controversial as the remains of these animals are immature or juvenile individuals. With the exception of Nanotyrannus (now recovered as an eutyrannosaurian outside Tyrannosauridae) and possibly Raptorex, it is widely assumed that the Asian specimens are early growth stages of Tarbosaurus, whereas the North American specimens are those of Tyrannosaurus.

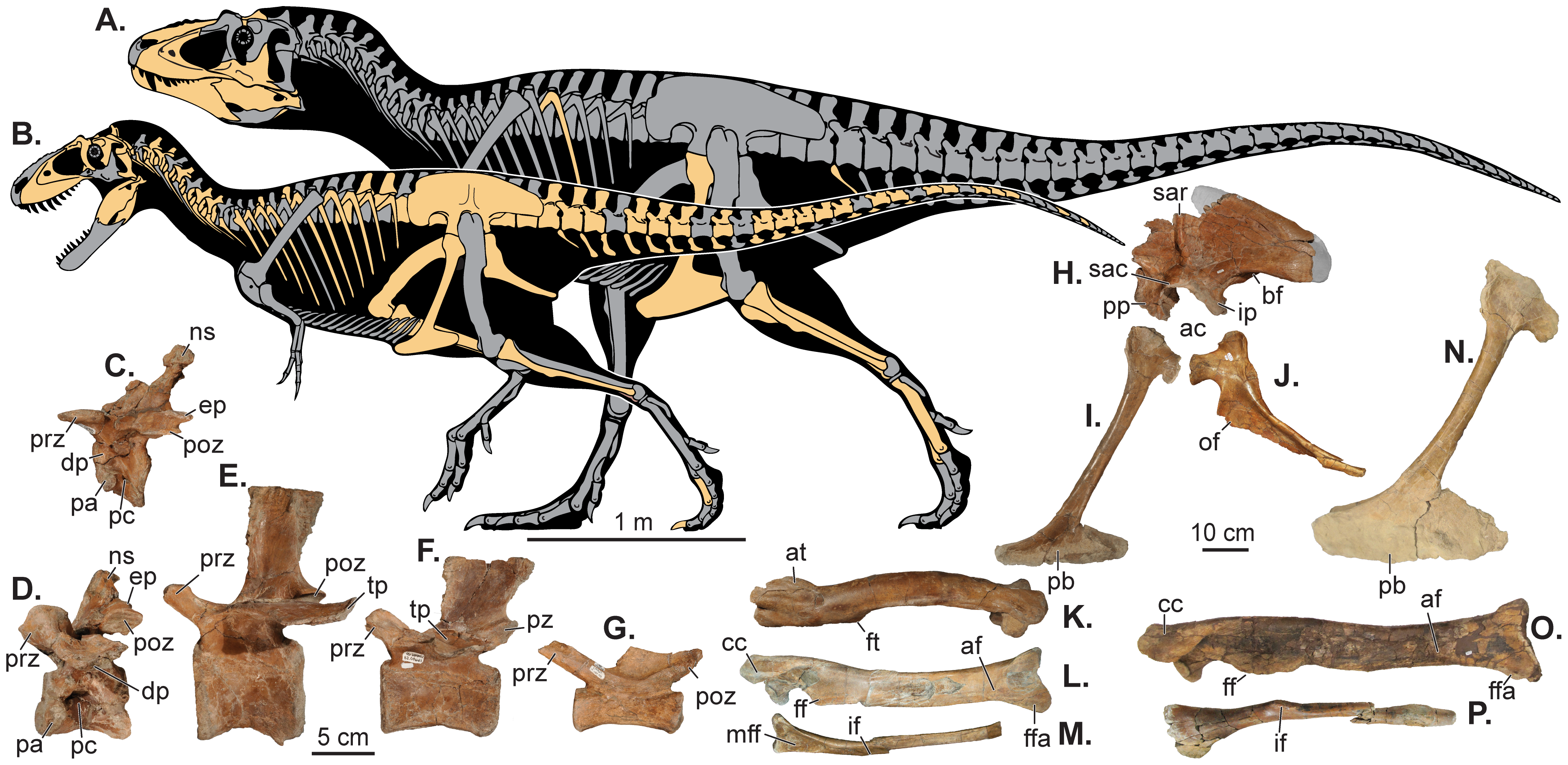
Skeletal diagrams showing holotype remains of Lythronax (A) and a Teratophoneus specimen (B). N–P show selected bones of the former

Valid genera would not be named until the 2010s, where in 2011 announced the publication of Teratophoneus by Thomas D. Carr and colleagues. The fossils were first found in the Kaiparowits Formation of southern Utah. Later, fossils from the same formation were discovered and identified as the genus. Argon-argon radiometric dating indicates that the Kaiparowits Formation was deposited between 76.1 and 74.0 million years ago, during the Campanian stage of the Late Cretaceous period. This date means that Teratophoneus lived in the middle of the Campanian stage of the Late Cretaceous. In the same year Zhuchengtyrannus was named by David W. E. Hone and colleagues based on the holotype ZCDM V0031, a nearly complete right maxilla and associated left dentary (lower jaw, both with teeth) housed at Zhucheng Dinosaur Museum. In 2014 came Nanuqsaurus, the northern most tyrannosaurid found in Prince Creek Formation of the North Slope of Alaska, United States. In the same year also announced Qianzhousaurus known from a partial sub-adult individual consisting of a nearly complete skull with the lower jaws missing all teeth (lost during fossilization), 9 cervical vertebrae, 3 dorsal vertebrae, 18 caudal vertebrae, both scapulocoracoids, partial ilia, and the left hindlimb compromising the femur, tibia, fibula, astragalus with calcaneum, and metatarsals III and IV. Lythronax, the oldest known member of Tyrannosauridae, was described in 2013 by Mark A. Loewen and colleagues from a nearly complete specimen that was uncovered in 2009 in the Wahweap Formation of the Grand Staircase–Escalante National Monument.

== Natural history ==
=== Description ===
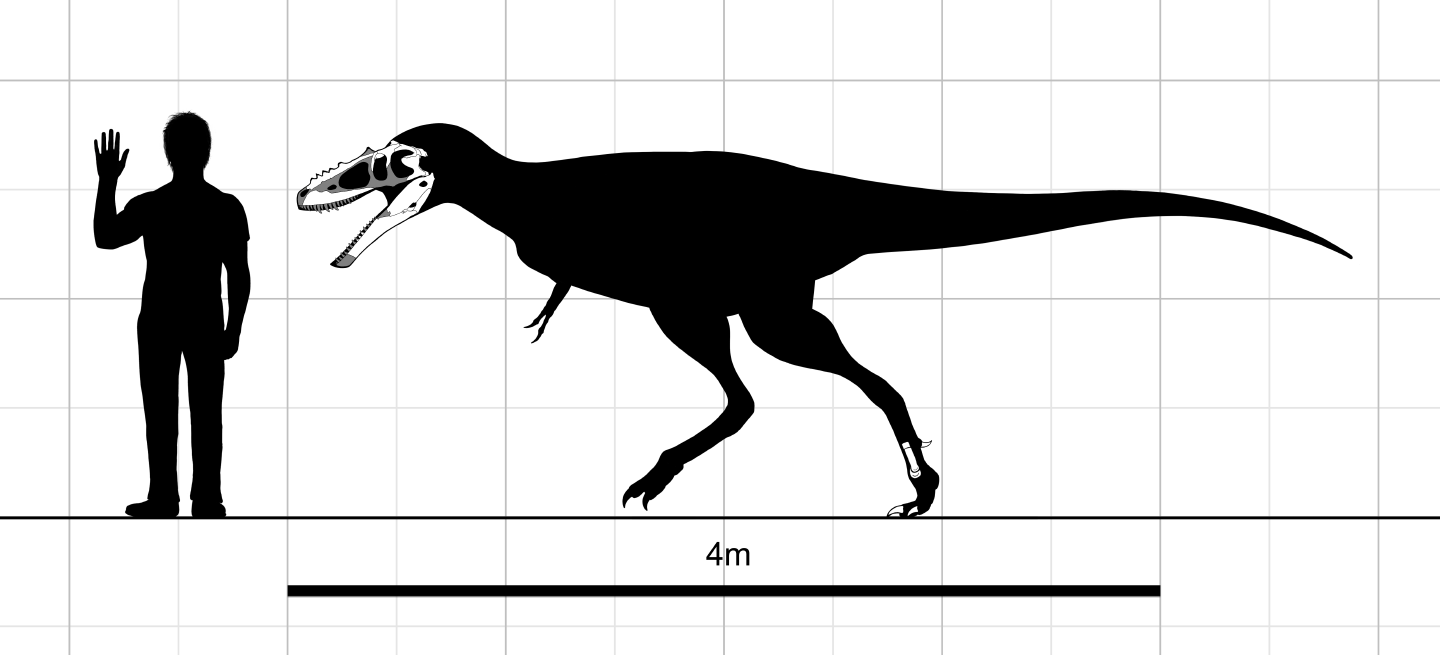
Size of A. remotus compared with a human

The specimens "Sue", AMNH 5027, "Stan", and "Jane", to scale with a human

In comparison to the albertosaurines, tyrannosaurines were more heavily built and larger. The alioramin genera of Qianzhousaurus and Alioramus, however, were the exception, as they were more comparable in built to albertosaurines and have longirostrine snouts. Like albertosaurines, tyrannosaurines also had heterodont dentition, large heads design to catch and kill their prey, and short didactyl arms. Based on the growth stages of Tyrannosaurus (and possibly Tarbosaurus), tyrannosaurines undergone ontogenetic changes from gracile or slender, semi-longirostrine immatures to robust, heavy-headed adults. This implies that these animals occupy different ecological niches as they developed. While there is fossil evidence of earlier tyrannosauroids having feathers, the evidence of such structures in tyrannosaurids is controversial as a study in 2017 from Bell and colleagues found no support in feathered integument in tyrannosaurids. The study used skin impressions which are small, found widely dispersed across the post-cranium at different regions of the body with a pattern similar to crocodiles. Further the croc analogy Thomas Carr and colleagues in 2017 by studying the snout of Daspletosaurus suggested they have large scales with sensory neuron pits under the skin. This notion has been challenged from other authors who suggested a more lip-covering of the teeth.

=== Distribution ===
The temporal range for tyrannosaurines went from almost 80.6 million years ago in the Campanian stage of the Late Cretaceous epoch to 66 million years ago in the Maastrichtian stage. Fossils have been found in different formations in what is now east Asia and western North America. While the Asian alioramins are the basal most group of the tyrannosaurines, the geographic placement of albertosaurines and other eutyrannosaurian tyrannosauroids found in North America suggests greatly the tyrannosaurines are North American in origin.

== Systematics ==
Prior to the 2010s, the relationships of the tyrannosaurines was best understood as Tyrannosaurus being a sister taxon to Tarbosaurus. These two genera in turn were the sister taxon to Daspletosaurus, follow by Alioramus. There was an alternative hypothesis from Phil Currie and colleagues (2003) who suggested Daspletosaurus to be more closely related to Tarbosaurus and Alioramus than to Tyrannosaurus based on cranial features. This relationship, however, has not been found in more recent studies. In 1988 Gregory Paul considered all tyrannosaurines at the time except Alioramus to be species of Tyrannosaurus. In the second edition of The Princeton Field Guide to Dinosaurs published in 2016, Paul would continue this thought as well as including Bistahieversor, Teratophoneus, Lythronax, and Nanuqsaurus into the genus as well. This multispecies Tyrannosaurus classification is, however, not widely accepted by most paleontologists. In some phylogenetic studies Bistahieversor is nested within Tyrannosaurinae, but it is most often recovered as the sister taxon to Tyrannosauridae instead.

The cladogram below displays the position of the Tyrannosaurinae within Eutyrannosauria and Tyrannosauridae, based on the results of phylogenetic analyses performed by Voris et al. (2020):

- Eutyrannosauria
  - Dryptosaurus aquilunguis
  - - Appalachiosaurus montgomeriensis
    - - Bistahieversor sealeyi
      - Tyrannosauridae
        - Albertosaurinae
          - Gorgosaurus libratus
          - Albertosaurus sarcophagus
        - - Tyrannosaurinae

As of 2023, at least three lineages of tyrannosaurines have been suggested. The basalmost clade is the Alioramini. The second clade to diverge is the Teratophoneini, which comprises the American southwest taxa Dynamoterror, Lythronax, and Teratophoneus. They are sister to a third clade comprising Nanuqsaurus and the clade containing Daspletosaurini, which includes Daspletosaurus and Thanatotheristes, and the Tyrannosaurini, which includes Zhuchengtyrannus, Tarbosaurus, and Tyrannosaurus.

The cladogram below displays the results of the strict consensus phylogenetic analysis performed by Scherer & Voiculescu-Holvad (2023), indicating the distinct lineages of tyrannosaurines.

- Tyrannosaurinae
  - Alioramini
    - Alioramus remotus
    - - Alioramus altai
      - Qianzhousaurus sinensis
  - - Teratophoneini
      - Dynamoterror dynastes
      - - Teratophoneus curriei
        - Lythronax argestes
    - - Nanuqsaurus hoglundi
      - - Daspletosaurini
          - Thanatotheristes degrootorum
          - - Daspletosaurus horneri
            - - Daspletosaurus wilsoni
              - - Daspletosaurus torosus
                - TMP 2001.36.1
        - Tyrannosaurini
          - Zhuchengtyrannus magnus
          - - Tarbosaurus bataar
            - Tyrannosaurus rex
