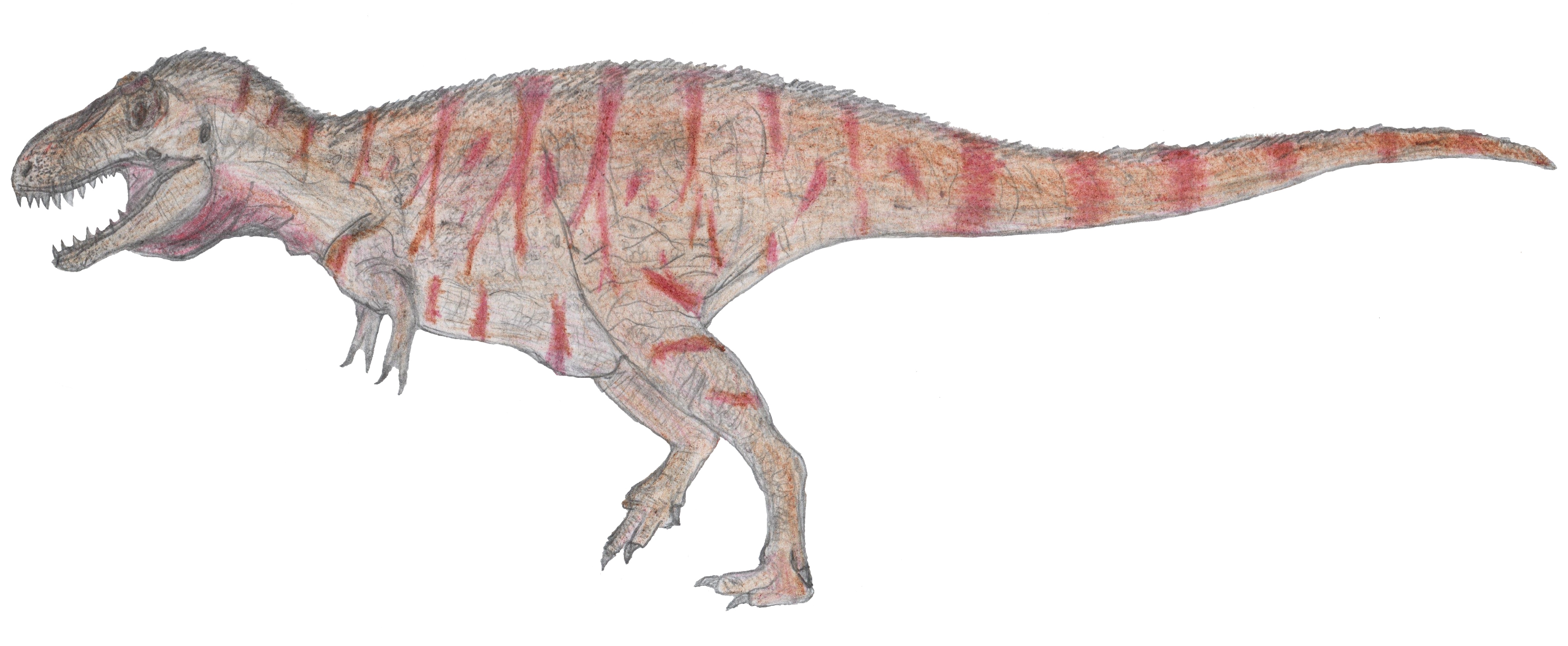
- Life restoration

Scientific classification
- Kingdom: Animalia
- Phylum: Chordata
- Class: Reptilia
- Clade: Dinosauria
- Clade: Saurischia
- Clade: Theropoda
- Superfamily: †Tyrannosauroidea
- Family: †Tyrannosauridae
- Subfamily: †Tyrannosaurinae
- Tribe: †Daspletosaurini
- Genus: †Thanatotheristes; Voris et al., 2020

Type species
- †Thanatotheristes degrootorum Voris et al., 2020

Synonyms
- Daspletosaurus degrootorum? (Voris et al., 2020)

= Thanatotheristes =

Thanatotheristes Temporal range: Late Cretaceous, middle Campanian 80.3–79.5 Ma

Daspletosaurin tyrannosaurid of the mid-Campanian

Thanatotheristes (meaning "reaper of death" according to the original authors; literally, "death harvester" in Greek: Θάνατος, romanized: Thánatos, "Death" and θεριστής, romanized: theristḗs, "harvester") is a genus of tyrannosaurid dinosaur from the Late Cretaceous of Laramidia, approximately 80.1-79.5 Ma. Thanatotheristes contains only one species, T. degrootorum. Fossils of this taxon are found in the Foremost Formation of Alberta, Canada, coexisting with medium-sized ceratopsids like Xenoceratops foremostensis and small pachycephalosaurids like Colepiocephale lambei.

== Discovery and naming ==
The holotype specimen of Thanatotheristes degrootorum (TMP 2010.5.7) is based on a right maxilla, right jugal, right postorbital, right surangular, right quadrate, right laterosphenoid, left frontal, and both dentaries. The length of the skull has been approximated to be 800 millimetres (31 in). It was smaller than the closely related Daspletosaurus, but the holotype individual was not osteologically mature at the time of death. A referred specimen, TMP 2018.016.0001, is based solely on a partial right maxilla from another subadult individual. It was found at the Twelve Mile Coulee in the upper Herronton Sandstone of the Foremost Formation. The specific name honours John and Sandra De Groot, who discovered the type specimen.

== Description ==
Size of Thanatotheristes compared to a human

T. degrootorum is characterised by:

- A single row of evenly spaced dorsoventrally oriented ridges on the subcutaneous surface of the maxilla ventral and anteroventral to the antorbital fossa.
- Rounded and inflated orbital margin of the jugal.
- Sagittal crest on the frontal extends anterior to the supratemporal ridge as a broad and rounded ridge.
- Lacrimal contact surface on the frontal extends anteromedially at ~60° relative to interfrontal suture.
- Prefrontal with two posteriorly projecting prongs articulating with the frontal on ventral surface of skull roof (long, medial, primary prong and shorter secondary, lateral prong).

The type specimen of Thanatotheristes has been estimated at 8 m (26 ft), based on the skull material and comparisons with related genera.

== Classification ==
The formal description of T. degrootorum erected a new clade within Tyrannosauridae, Daspletosaurini, a sister taxon to a clade comprising Zhuchengtyrannus, Tarbosaurus, and Tyrannosaurus. It includes T. degrootorum, Daspletosaurus torosus, D. horneri, and a tyrannosaurid from the Dinosaur Park Formation (FMNH PR308). The existence of Daspletosaurini shows that there is geographic segregation of clades within Tyrannosauridae, with the clade of Bistahieversor and the clade formed by Lythronax and Teratophoneus living in the south of Laramidia, and Albertosaurinae and Daspletosaurini occupying Canada and northern USA.

The cladogram below is the result of the phylogenetic analysis performed by Voris et al. (2020):

- Eutyrannosauria
  - Dryptosaurus aquilunguis
  - - Appalachiosaurus montgomeriensis
    - - Bistahieversor sealeyi
      - - Tyrannosauridae
          - Albertosaurinae
            - Gorgosaurus libratus
            - Albertosaurus sarcophagus
          - Tyrannosaurinae
            - Alioramini
              - Qianzhousaurus sinensis
              - - Alioramus remotus
                - Alioramus altai
            - - - Teratophoneus curriei
                - Dynamoterror dynastes
                - Lythronax argestes
              - - Nanuqsaurus hoglundi
                - - Daspletosaurini
                    - Thanatotheristes degrootorum
                    - - Daspletosaurus torosus
                      - Daspletosaurus horneri
                  - - Zhuchengtyrannus magnus
                    - - Tarbosaurus bataar
                      - Tyrannosaurus rex

An analysis of a subadult Daspletosaurus torosus frontal by Yun, 2020 suggests that features of the bone would effectively demonstrate that autapomorphies of some tyrannosaurid taxa would be inadequate, due to the broad range in morphology of frontals within particular clades. This may suggest that any autapomorphies or synapomorphies pertaining to the frontal of T. degrootorum are inadequate, and may therefore render it a species of Daspletosaurus. This identification was based on the 2003 study by Philip J. Currie. A subsequent analysis of Gorgosaurus ontogeny by Voris et al, 2021 found that Philip Currie's initial identification of this frontal as Daspletosaurus was in error and that the frontal actually belonging to a Gorgosaurus. This study further reinforced the frontal autapomorphies of Thanatotheristes initially proposed by Voris et al (2020) as valid noting that Yun (2020)'s consideration of the characters as invalid was due to his misidentification of the specimen as Daspletosaurus and a misinterpretation of the frontal morphology of tyrannosaurids overall.
