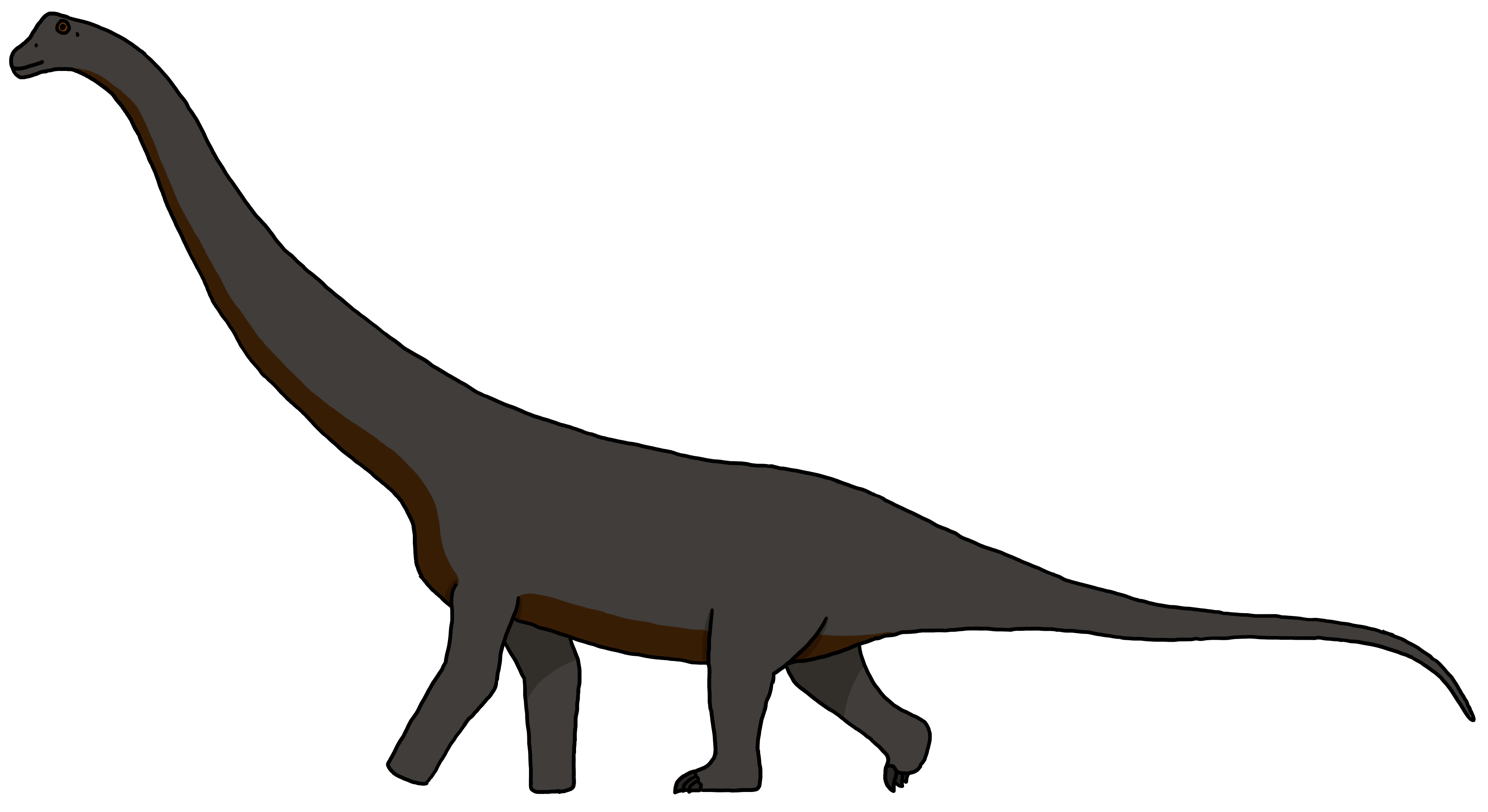
- Hypothetical restoration based on Opisthocoelicaudia

Scientific classification
- Kingdom: Animalia
- Phylum: Chordata
- Class: Reptilia
- Clade: Dinosauria
- Clade: Saurischia
- Clade: †Sauropodomorpha
- Clade: †Sauropoda
- Clade: †Macronaria
- Clade: †Titanosauria
- Family: †Saltasauridae
- Genus: †Zhuchengtitan; Mo et al., 2017

Type species
- †Zhuchengtitan zangjiazhuangensis Mo et al., 2017

= Zhuchengtitan =

Zhuchengtitan Temporal range: Campanian, 73.5 Ma

Extinct genus of dinosaurs

Zhuchengtitan (meaning "Zhucheng titan") is a genus of titanosaurian sauropod dinosaur from the Late Cretaceous of Shandong, China. It contains a single species, Z. zangjiazhuangensis, named by Mo Jinyou and colleagues in 2017 from a single humerus. Zhuchengtitan can be identified by the extreme width of the top end of its humerus, as well as the expansion of the deltopectoral crest on its humerus; both of these characteristics indicate that it was likely closely related to Opisthocoelicaudia. However, it differs from the latter by the flatter bottom articulating surface of its humerus. Zhuchengtitan lived in a floodplain environment alongside Shantungosaurus, Zhuchengtyrannus, and Sinoceratops.

== Discovery and naming ==
Zhuchengtitan is known from a single humerus that was discovered in the Wangshi Group within the region of Zhucheng, Shandong, China. The primary fossil localities within this region are the Longgujian, Kugou, and Zangjiazhuang Quarries. In 2008, researchers from the Zhucheng Dinosaur Culture Research Center uncovered the humerus and some other sauropod bones at the Zangjiazhuang Quarry; the humerus was catalogued as ZJZ-57 at the center. While the humerus is mostly complete, the outer edge of the top end, all edges of the bottom end save for the rear edge, and the deltopectoral crest have all been partially lost to damage. Additionally, the preserved portions are twisted.

Locally, the Wangshi Group is further divided into two smaller units, the Xingezhuang and Hongtuya Formations. Deposits in the Xingezhuang Formation consist of multi-colored clastic rocks formed from siltstone, sandstone, and grey-colored clay, while deposits in the Hongtuya Formation consist of red interfingering layers of sandstone and conglomerate, capped at the top by a basalt layer. The boundary between the two is formed by sandy conglomerate and sandstone deposits; ZJZ-57 originates from this boundary.

In 2017, ZJZ-57 was described by Mo Jinyou, Wang Kebai, Chen Shuqing, Wang Peiye, and Xu Xing in a research paper published in the Geological Bulletin of China. They named it as a new genus and species of titanosaurian sauropod Zhuchengtitan zangjiazhuangensis; the genus name Zhuchengtitan combines Zhucheng with the Greek suffix titan ("titan", for "titanosaur"), while zangjiazhuangensis refers to its origin from the Zangjiazhuang Quarry.

== Description ==
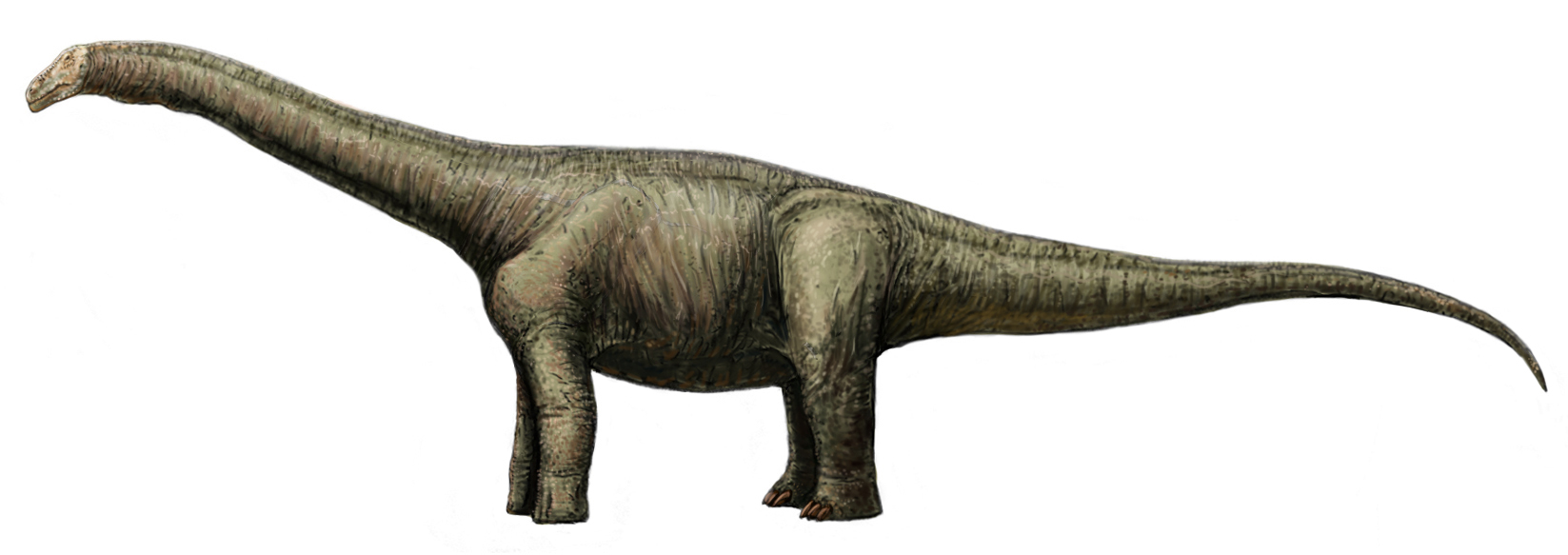
Reconstruction of the closely related Opisthocoelicaudia

The humerus ZJZ-57 (when viewed from the front) measures 108 centimetres (43 in) long, 59.3 centimetres (23.3 in) wide at the top, 23.1 centimetres (9.1 in) wide at midshaft, and 37.5 centimetres (14.8 in) wide at the bottom. It can be identified by the extreme width of its top end compared to other titanosaurs, which is 0.55 times its whole length. This figure is closest to the 0.49 of Saltasaurus and the 0.56 of Opisthocoelicaudia. Consequently, the robustness index (RI) (the ratio between the average of the three width measurements and the length) is also quite high, at 0.39; Saltasaurus has an RI of 0.35, while Opisthocoelicaudia has an RI of 0.38. The width arises from the inner edge of the bone, which is angled more sharply inwards at the top end of the bone than the bottom end.

Further below, the shaft of the bone is cylindrical in cross-section, with the long axis oriented sideways. The deltopectoral crest, which is located on the front surface near the top end of the bone, is very prominent, and bears a hook-like process about 1/3 of the way down its length. It extends downwards to the midshaft of the bone, and sideways so that it occupies the outer 2/5 of the bone's width. In Opisthocoelicaudia, the crest is wider, occupying 1/2 of the bone's width. The humerus forms a wide depression on the portion of the shaft further inward than the crest.

Near the top end on the back of the bone, there are two depressions bordering a central ridge, which extends upwards to support the rounded humeral head. On the bottom of the bone, the two condyles that articulate respectively with the radius and ulna are separated by a broad but shallow intercondylar groove, and there is a low but robust ridge on either side of the groove. These structures are more prominent in Saltasaurus and Opisthocoelicaudia. The condyles are expanded towards the front of the bone; viewed from the bottom, the surface of the condyles is very roughened.

== Classification ==
On account of the inward and downward expansion of the deltopectoral crest, the localized swelling of the bone surrounding the crest, and the presence of a projecting process 1/3 of the way down the length of the crest, Mo and colleagues assigned Zhuchengtitan to the Saltasauridae, given the status of these traits as defining characteristics of the group. Despite differences in the condyles, they recognized that the form and proportions of the humerus, including the RI, were most similar to Opisthocoelicaudia. Thus, they hypothesized that Opisthocoelicaudia and Zhuchengtitan may be closely related, but noted that this conclusion would need to be confirmed by the discovery of additional material. As for other Asian titanosaurs, Zhuchengtitan can be distinguished from Qingxiusaurus, Huabeisaurus, Borealosaurus, and Phuwiangosaurus by the greater width of the top end of its humerus as well as its better-developed deltopectoral crest. It cannot be compared with other genera that lack preserved humeri.

== Paleoecology ==
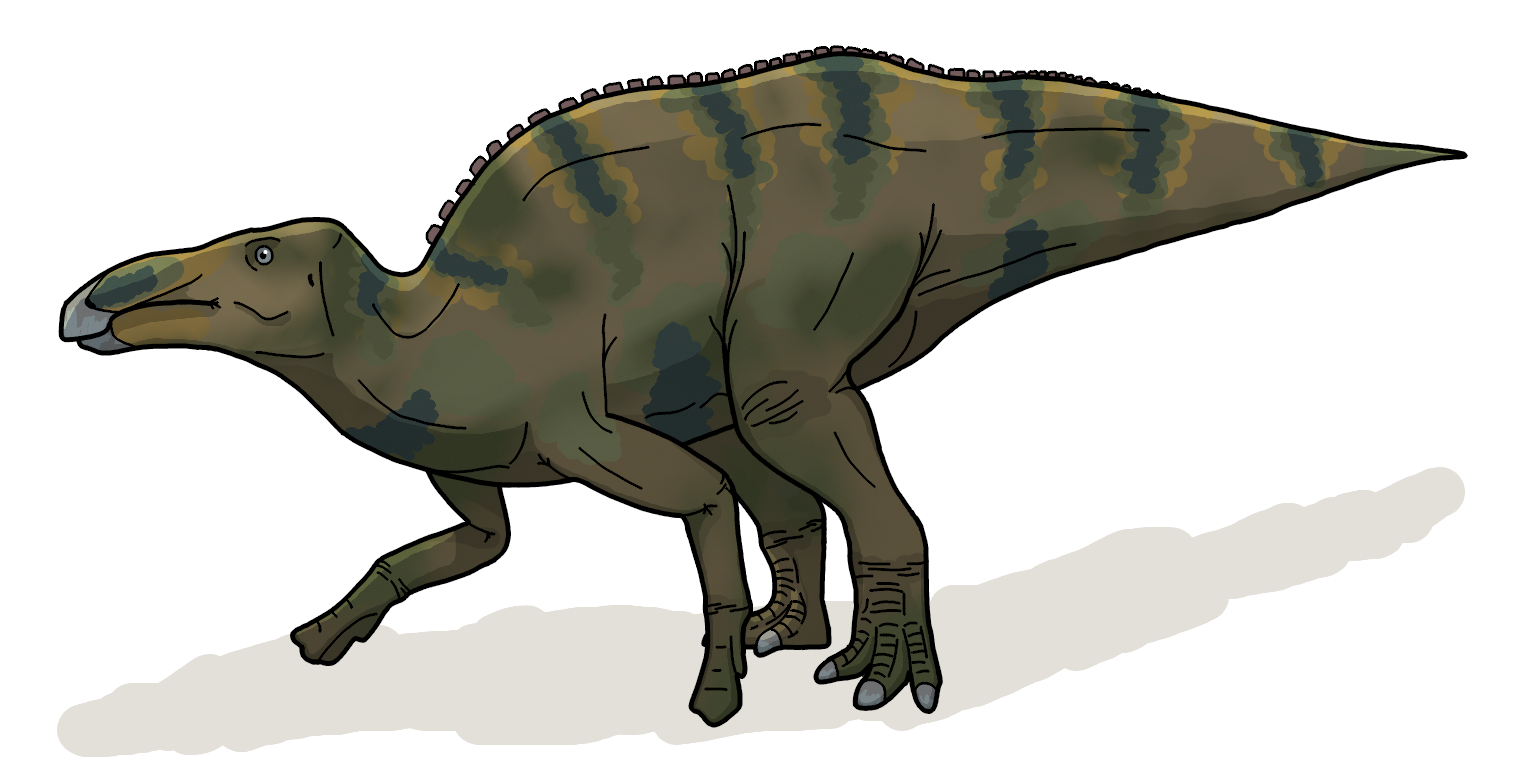
Shantungosaurus was a contemporary of Zhuchengtitan

The deposits from which Zhuchengtitan originated are characteristic of alluvial fans, braided rivers, and floodplains. Based on argon-argon dating of the basalt layer at its top end, the Hongtuya Member at Zangjiazhuang has been estimated at 73.5 Ma in age, which places it during the Campanian age of the Cretaceous period. Other dinosaurs found at Zangjiazhuang include the hadrosaurid ornithopod Shantungosaurus giganteus (referred to by Mo and colleagues as "Huaxiasaurus maximus"), the tyrannosaurid theropod Zhuchengtyrannus magnus, and the ceratopsid Sinoceratops zhuchengensis. Dinosaur fossils at Zangjiazhuang generally only consist of a few specimens except for the thousands of Shantungosaurus specimens that are known, which likely represent the victims of a sudden mass mortality event.

== See also ==
- 2017 in archosaur paleontology
