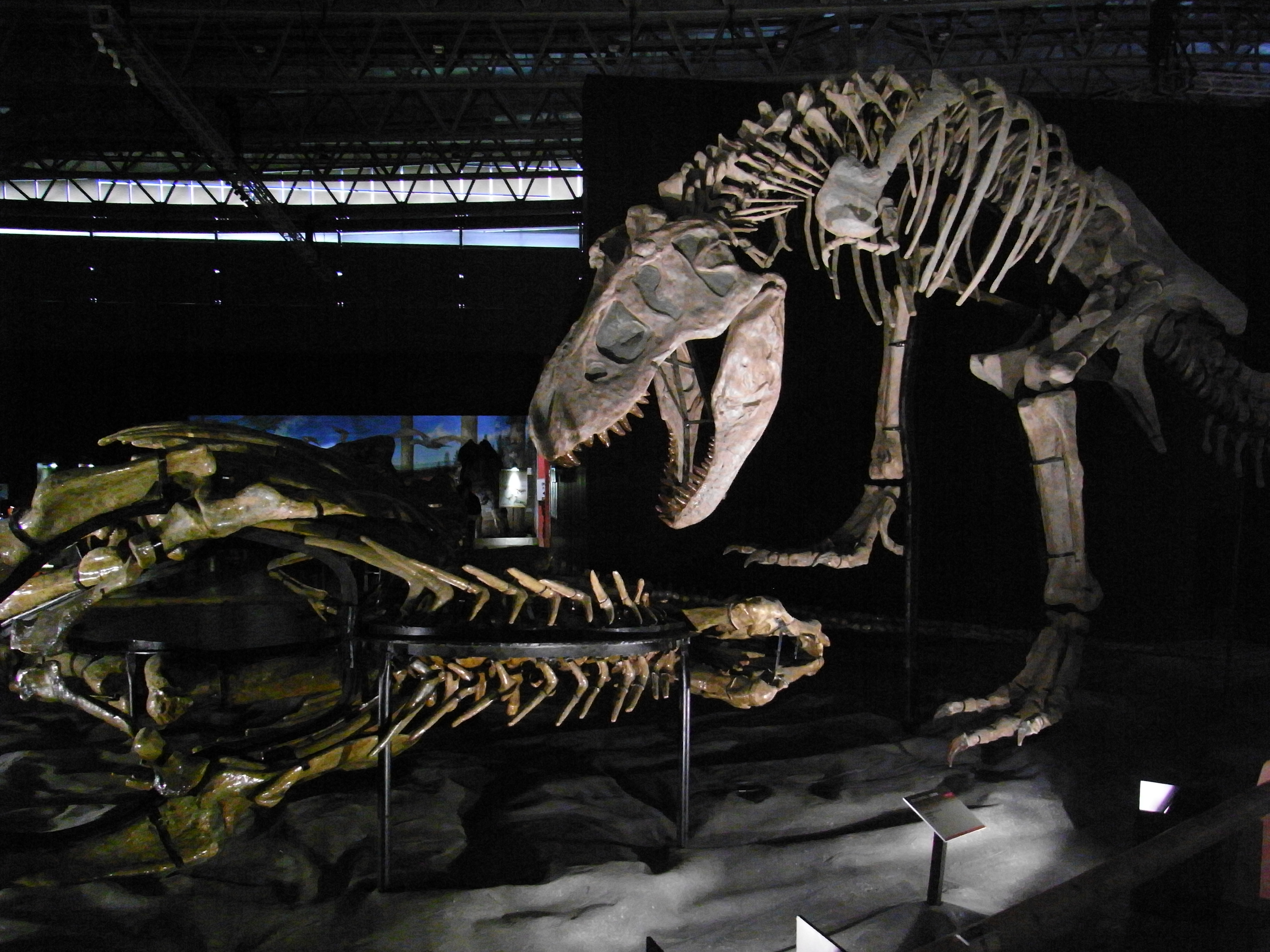
- Reconstructed skeleton, with missing bones cast from Tyrannosaurus

Scientific classification
- Kingdom: Animalia
- Phylum: Chordata
- Class: Reptilia
- Clade: Dinosauria
- Clade: Saurischia
- Clade: Theropoda
- Superfamily: †Tyrannosauroidea
- Family: †Tyrannosauridae
- Subfamily: †Tyrannosaurinae
- Tribe: †Tyrannosaurini
- Genus: †Zhuchengtyrannus; Hone et al., 2011

Type species
- †Zhuchengtyrannus magnus Hone et al., 2011

Synonyms
- Tyrannosaurus zhuchengensis? Hu et al., 2001

= Zhuchengtyrannus =

Zhuchengtyrannus Temporal range: Campanian ~73.5 Ma

Tyrannosaurid theropod dinosaur genus from Late Cretaceous period

Zhuchengtyrannus (meaning "Zhucheng tyrant") is a genus of tyrannosaurid theropod dinosaur from Asia, known from the Campanian stage of the Late Cretaceous of Shandong Province, China. It belongs to the subfamily Tyrannosaurinae, and contains a single species, Zhuchengtyrannus magnus.

== Discovery and naming ==
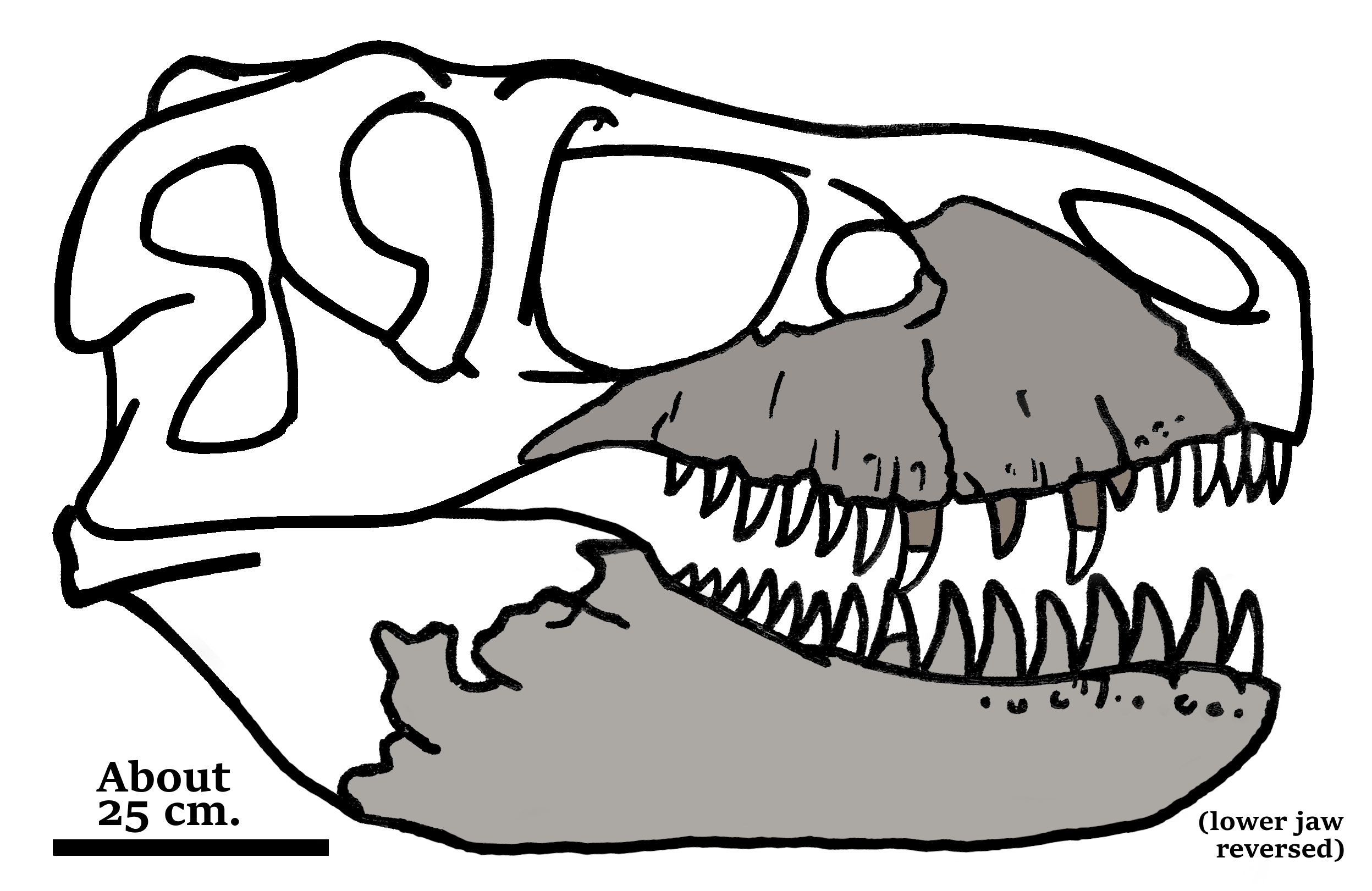
Diagram showing known remains

Zhuchengtyrannus was first described and named by David W. E. Hone, Kebai Wang, Corwin Sullivan, Xijin Zhao, Shuqing Chen, Dunjin Li, Shuan Ji, Qiang Ji and Xing Xu in 2011 and the type species is Zhuchengtyrannus magnus. The generic name is derived from the word Zhucheng, which refers to the type locality, and tyrant in reference to its phylogenetic position as a tyrannosaurid. The specific name magnus meaning "great" in Latin refers to the relatively large size of Zhuchengtyrannus.

Zhuchengtyrannus is known solely from the holotype ZCDM V0031, a nearly complete right maxilla and associated left dentary (lower jaw, both with teeth) discovered during large scale excavations alongside the Sinankylosaurus holotype in 2008, and is currently housed at the Zhucheng Dinosaur Museum. Casts of the holotype, IVPP FV 1794, are held at the Institute of Vertebrate Paleontology and Paleoanthropology. ZCDM V0031 was collected in the Hongtuya Formation from the Wangshi Group at Zangjiazhuang quarry, Zhucheng City, dating to the Campanian stage, at least 73.5 million years ago. A second tyrannosaurid dentary (ZCDM V0030) and maxilla (ZCDM V0032) have also been collected at Zangjiazhuang quarry. Even though they were not associated with one another, both specimens are different from other tyrannosaurids, including Zhuchengtyrannus, implying the existence of at least one additional tyrannosaurid from the quarry. Apart from the tyrannosaurid material, specimens of Sinoceratops, hadrosaurids (probably Shantungosaurus) and the indeterminate dinosaur Sinankylosaurus were recovered from it. Zhuchengtyrannus was found in an area that was a floodplain in the Cretaceous period and contains one of the highest concentrations of dinosaur bones in the world.

== Description ==
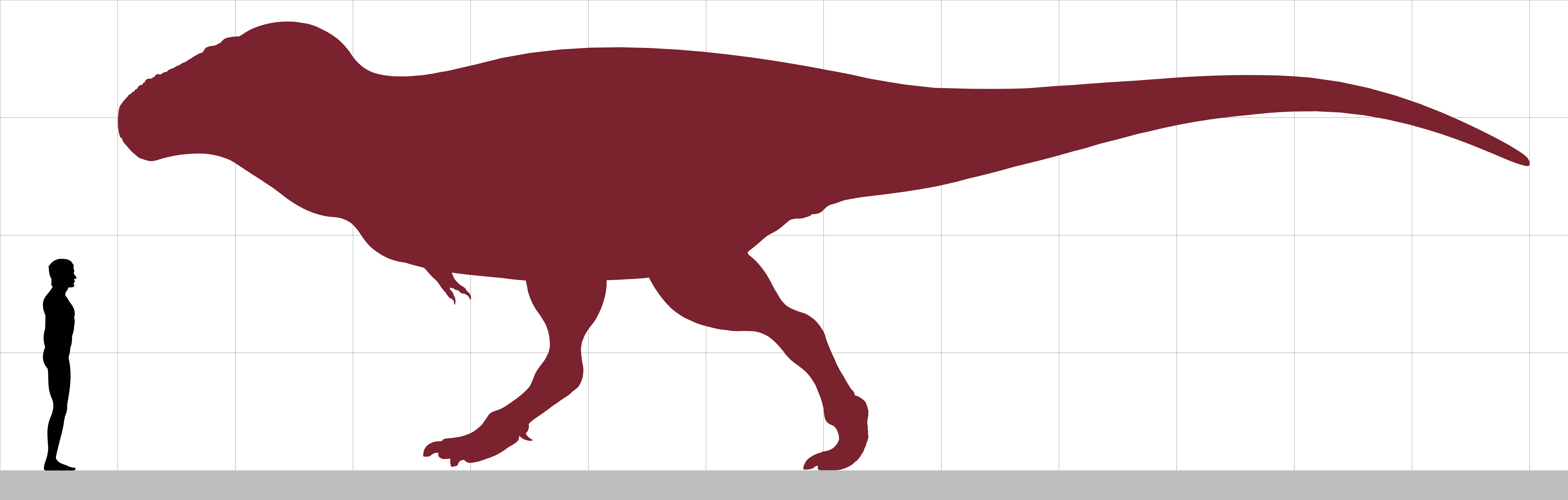
Estimated size compared to a human

Zhuchengtyrannus was a large carnivorous theropod, and the holotype specimen is estimated at 10 metres (33 ft) in length. However this is not the largest specimen. Other remains from the quarry are larger, similar in size to the T.rex specimen Sue. Thus the largest Zhuchengtyrannus would be 12–12.8 metres (39–42 ft) in length and 8 to 10 tonnes in weight.

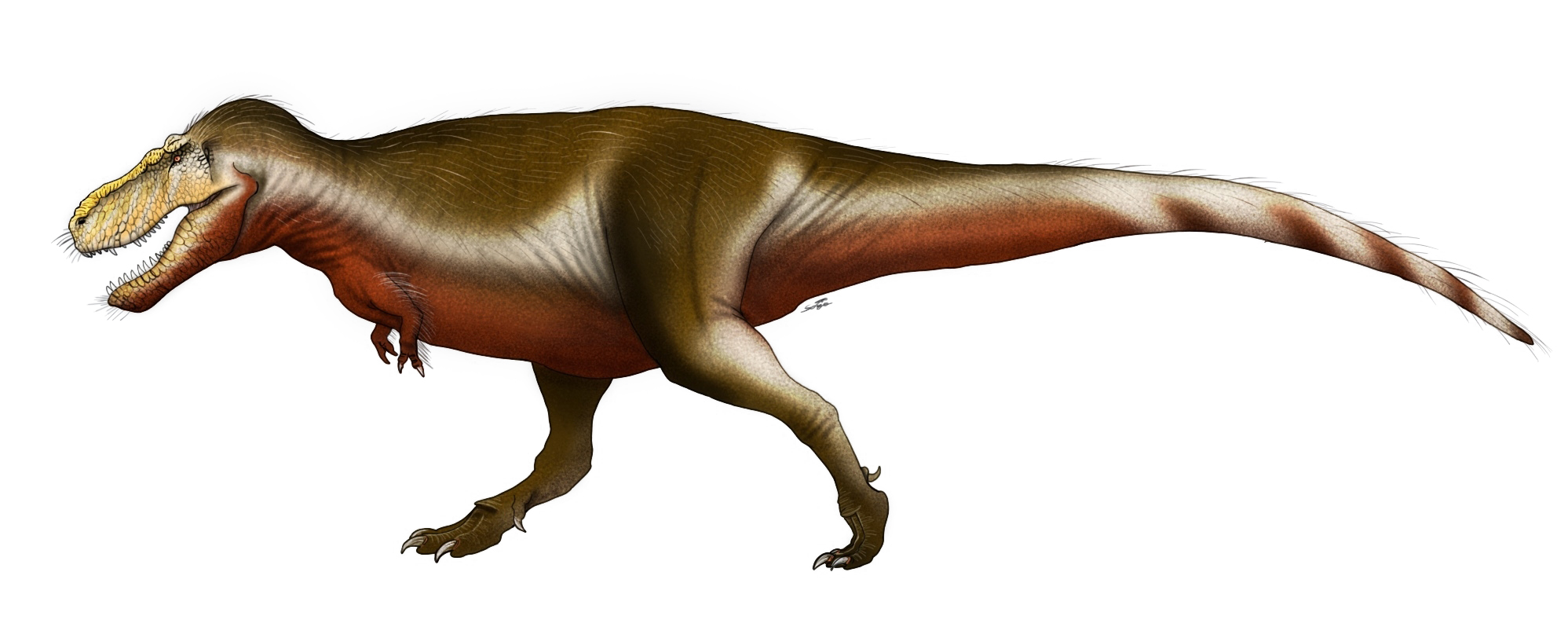
Life restoration

Zhuchengtyrannus can be distinguished from all other tyrannosaurines by a single autapomorphy, the presence of a horizontal shelf on the lateral surface of the base of the ascending process of the maxilla, and a rounded notch in the anterior margin of the maxillary fenestra. Zhuchengtyrannus also possesses a ventral margin of the antorbital fenestra that lies well above that of the ventral rim of the antorbital fossa. Additionally, the total length of the maxillary fenestra is more than half the distance between the anterior margins of the antorbital fossa and fenestra. Unlike the contemporaneous Tarbosaurus, Zhuchengtyrannus lacks a subcutaneous flange on the posterodorsal part of the jugal ramus of the maxilla, and a ventrally convex palatal shelf that covers the bulges of the roots of the rear teeth in medial view.

== Classification ==
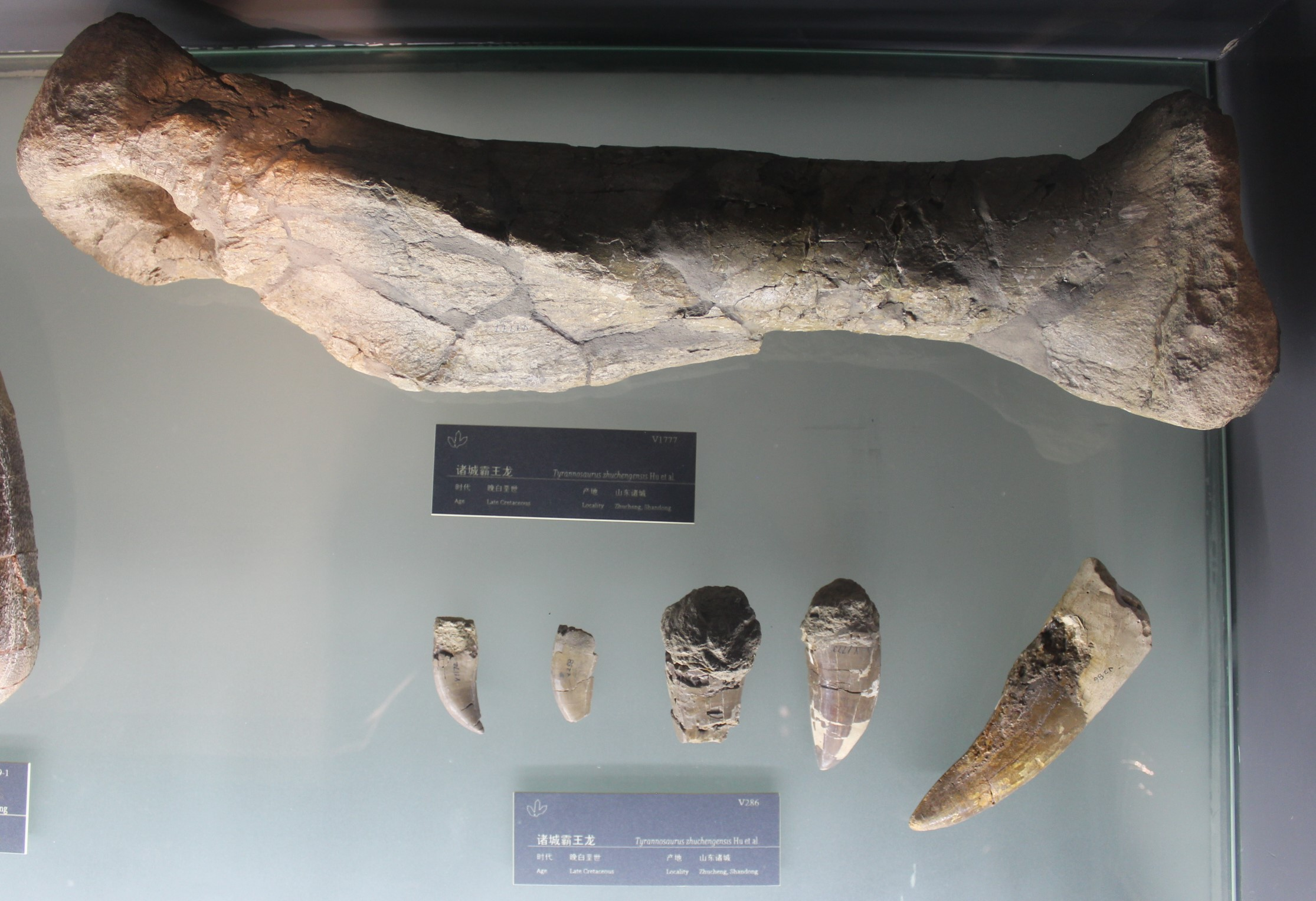
Metatarsal and teeth of "Tyrannosaurus zhuchengensis" at the Geological Museum of China

It is possible that several isolated teeth recovered from one of the Zhucheng dinosaur quarries during the 1970s, previously given the name Tyrannosaurus zhuchengensis, belong to this or a related species. The T. zhuchengensis teeth are characterized by serrations that extend all the way to the base of the tooth crown, a feature not seen in any other tyrannosaurine species. All known teeth of Zhuchengtyrannus are too poorly preserved in this area to compare with T. zhuchengensis, but further finds may clarify their relationship.

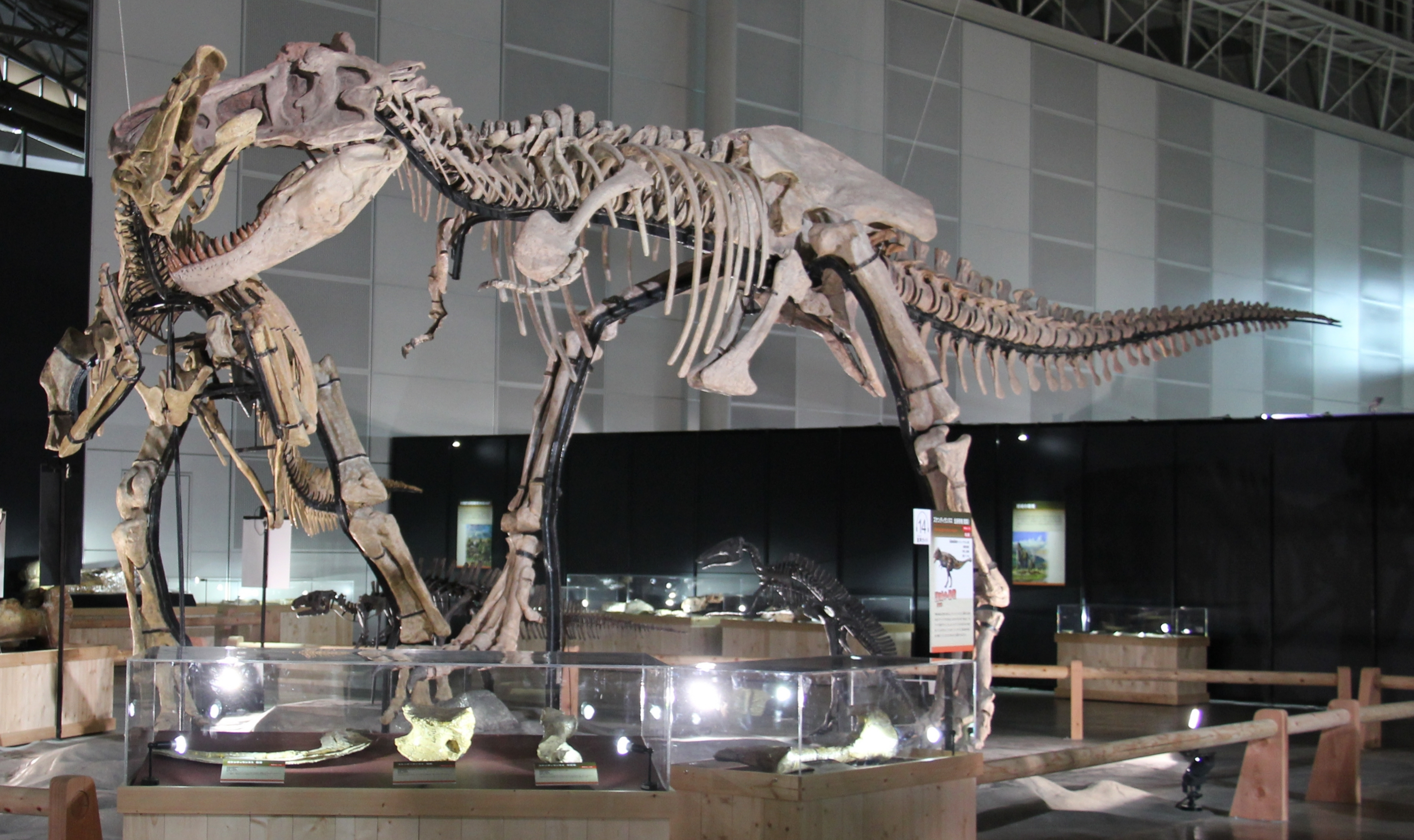
Restored skeleton mounted as attacking a juvenile Shantungosaurus

A phylogenetic analysis published with the description of the tyrannosaurine Lythronax in the journal PLOS One by Loewen et al. 2013, recovered Zhuchengtyrannus as the sister taxon of Tarbosaurus. It also suggests that Zhuchengtyrannus and other currently known Asian tyrannosaurids were part of an evolutionary radiation descending from the same North American stem that later gave rise to Tyrannosaurus rex, recovered as their closest known relative. Below are the results obtained in their phylogenetic analysis: A study by Voris et al in 2020 recovered Zuchengtyrannus as the sister taxon to a clade containing the Maastrichtian genera Tyrannosaurus and Tarbosaurus. A cladogram of their results is reproduced below:

- Tyrannosaurinae
  - Alioramini
    - Qianzhousaurus sinensis
    - - Alioramus remotus
      - Alioramus altai
  - - - Teratophoneus curriei
      - Dynamoterror dynastes
      - Lythronax argestes
    - - Nanuqsaurus hoglundi
      - - - Daspletosaurini
            - Thanatotheristes degrootorum
            - - Daspletosaurus torosus
              - Daspletosaurus horneri
          - - Zhuchengtyrannus magnus
            - - Tarbosaurus bataar
              - Tyrannosaurus rex

A 2024 study by Dalman and colleagues, incorporating their new species Tyrannosaurus mcraeensis instead found Zhuchengtyrannus to be the closest relative of Tarbosaurus:

- - - Albertosaurus sarcophagus
    - Gorgosaurus libratus
  - - - - Daspletosaurus horneri
        - Thanatotheristes
      - - Daspletosaurus torosus
        - Daspletosaurus wilsoni
    - - Teratophoneus
      - - Nanuqsaurus
        - - Bistahieversor
          - - Lythronax
            - Tyrannosaurini
              - - Tyrannosaurus mcraeensis
                - Tyrannosaurus rex
              - - Zhuchengtyrannus
                - Tarbosaurus

== See also ==
- Timeline of tyrannosaur research
- List of Asian dinosaurs
