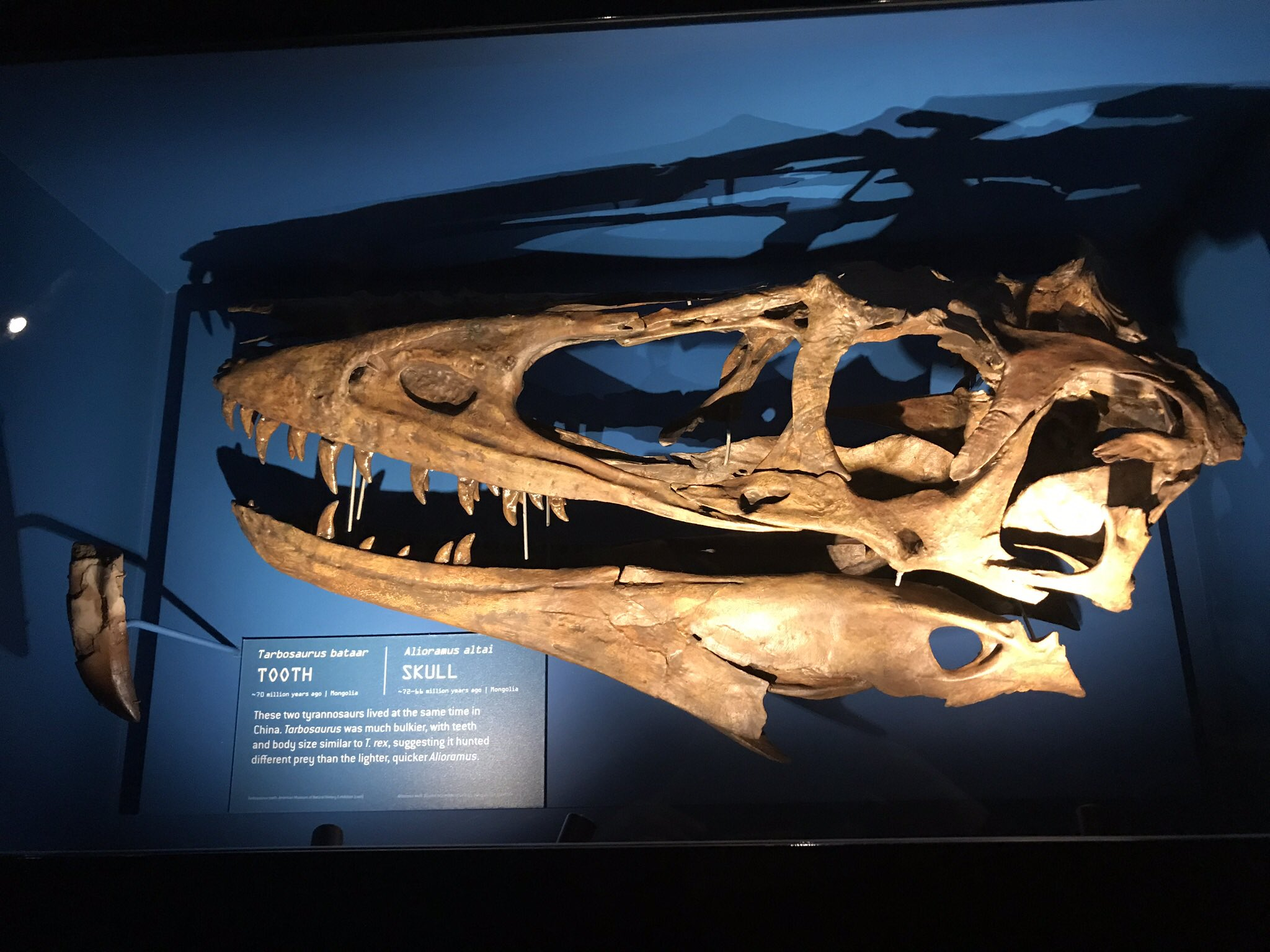
- Holotype skull of Alioramus altai
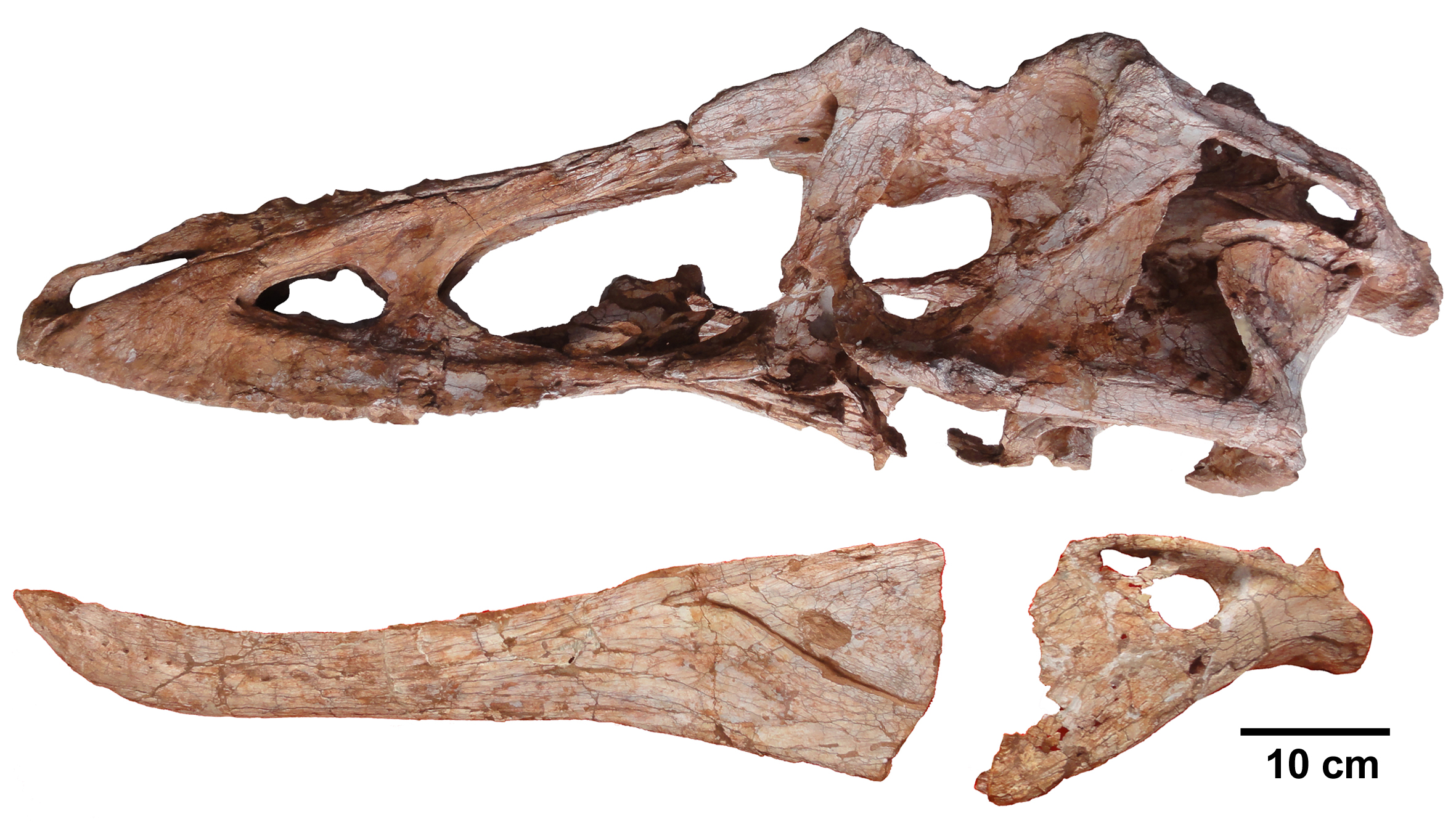
- Holotype skull of Qianzhousaurus

Scientific classification
- Kingdom: Animalia
- Phylum: Chordata
- Clade: Dinosauria
- Clade: Saurischia
- Clade: Theropoda
- Superfamily: †Tyrannosauroidea
- Family: †Tyrannosauridae
- Subfamily: †Tyrannosaurinae
- Tribe: †Alioramini; Olshevsky, Ford & Yamamoto, 1995

Type species
- Alioramus remotus Kurzanov, 1976

Genera
- †Alioramus; †Qianzhousaurus

Synonyms
- Alioramidae (Olshevsky et al., 1995) Ford, 2005

= Alioramini =

Alioramins Temporal range: Late Cretaceous, ~70–66 Ma

Extinct clade of tyrannosaurid dinosaurs

Alioramini is a clade of long-snouted tyrannosaurine tyrannosaurid dinosaurs from the Late Cretaceous epoch. It includes the genera Alioramus and Qianzhousaurus. Although tyrannosaurids are known from a variety of places around the globe, alioramins are restricted to Asia in mostly Maastrichtian strata. Many of the fossils attributed to Alioramini are not from fully developed individuals.

== Description ==
Size of three alioramin species compared to a human

Alioramins are medium-sized tyrannosaurids, reaching around 5–7 m (16–23 ft) in length. They have a more gracile body plan as compared to most other tyrannosaurines. Alioramins have rather shallow snouts, a trait that is rather rare among tyrannosaurs but can be found in the early tyrannosauroid, Xiongguanlong. Alioramins are unique when compared to contemporary tyrannosaurs from the same time, such as Tarbosaurus and Tyrannosaurus, because most of the longer snouted tyrannosauroids, such as Xiongguanlong, were found in deposits dating to earlier times during the Cretaceous. Members of the alioramins also have an elongated maxillary fenestra. Besides their elongated snouts, perhaps another major trait that makes alioramins stand out is their nasal ridges. While most other tyrannosaurids have nasal ridges, the nasal ridges in alioramins are pronounced and discrete. They form well developed bumps on the surface of the nasal bones, forming their nasal crest. Within the dentary bone, alioramins have 18 or more teeth.

== Classification ==
The name Alioramini was first coined in 1995 by George Olshevsky, Tracy L. Ford and Seiji Yamamoto only to contain the at-the-time uncertain Alioramus. Olshevsky classified Alioramini within the base of Tyrannosaurinae and considered it to be a tribe or a "paratribe" (a name for a paraphyletic tribe, emphasizing Olshevsky's view that the hypothetical common ancestor of tyrannosaurids could be classified as an alioramin). Alioramini were first described as a clade by Junchang Lü and colleagues in 2014, who defined it as a branch-based clade containing all tyrannosaurids more related to Alioramus than to Albertosaurus, Proceratosaurus, and Tyrannosaurus. Hence, the clade Alioramini consists of three species, namely Alioramus altai, Alioramus remotus, and Qianzhousaurus sinensis.

Dinosaur researcher Gregory S. Paul has proposed a potential synonymy between Qianzhousaurus and Alioramus, though others maintain them as separate genera. Alioramini is usually considered to be a part of the Tyrannosaurinae subfamily within the Tyrannosauridae family. This is supported by several features, including a maxillary process of the premaxilla that points upwards; the deep joint surface in the maxilla conceals certain features related to tooth roots; the particular shape of the lacrimal, mostly hidden from view; and an ectopterygoid with a pneumatic recess that possesses a distinctive round or triangular shape. Below is a cladogram showing a basal placement of Alioramini within the Tyrannosaurinae, according to Brusatte & Carr (2016).

- Tyrannosauridae
  - Albertosaurinae
    - Gorgosaurus libratus
    - Albertosaurus sarcophagus
  - Tyrannosaurinae
    - - Alioramini
        - Qianzhousaurus sinensis
        - - Alioramus altai
          - Alioramus remotus
    - - - Nanuqsaurus hoglundi
        - Teratophoneus curriei
      - - Lythronax argestes
        - - - Daspletosaurus horneri
            - Daspletosaurus torosus
          - - Zhuchengtyrannus magnus
            - - Tarbosaurus bataar
              - Tyrannosaurus rex

In their 2025 description of the non-tyrannosaurid tyrannosauroid Khankhuuluu, Voris et al. (2025) proposed a novel arrangement of tyrannosaurine clades; suggesting that alioramins were a late-diverging clade more closely related to the similarly-aged Tyrannosaurini (Zhuchengtyrannus, Tarbosaurus, and Tyrannosaurus) than previously recognized. The authors reasoned that previous analyses had over-scored anatomical characters related to shallow skull morphology (a trait more common in non-tyrannosaurids and juvenile tyrannosaurids), which resulted in more basal positions for these species. They recognized seven cranial features that alioramins share with tyrannosaurins to the exclusion of other tyrannosaurines. They further argued that the juvenile-like proportions of alioramins were the result of paedomorphosis, rather than immaturity or being indicative of a basal phylogenetic position. These results are displayed in the cladogram below:

- Eutyrannosauria
  - - Albertosaurus
    - Gorgosaurus
  - - - Lythronax
      - Teratophoneus
    - - Bistahieversor
      - - Nanuqsaurus
        - - Thanatotheristes
          - - - Daspletosaurus torosus
              - Daspletosaurus horneri
            - - Alioramini
                - Alioramus spp.
                - Qianzhousaurus
              - Tyrannosaurini
                - Zhuchengtyrannus
                - - Tarbosaurus
                  - Tyrannosaurus rex

== Paleobiology ==
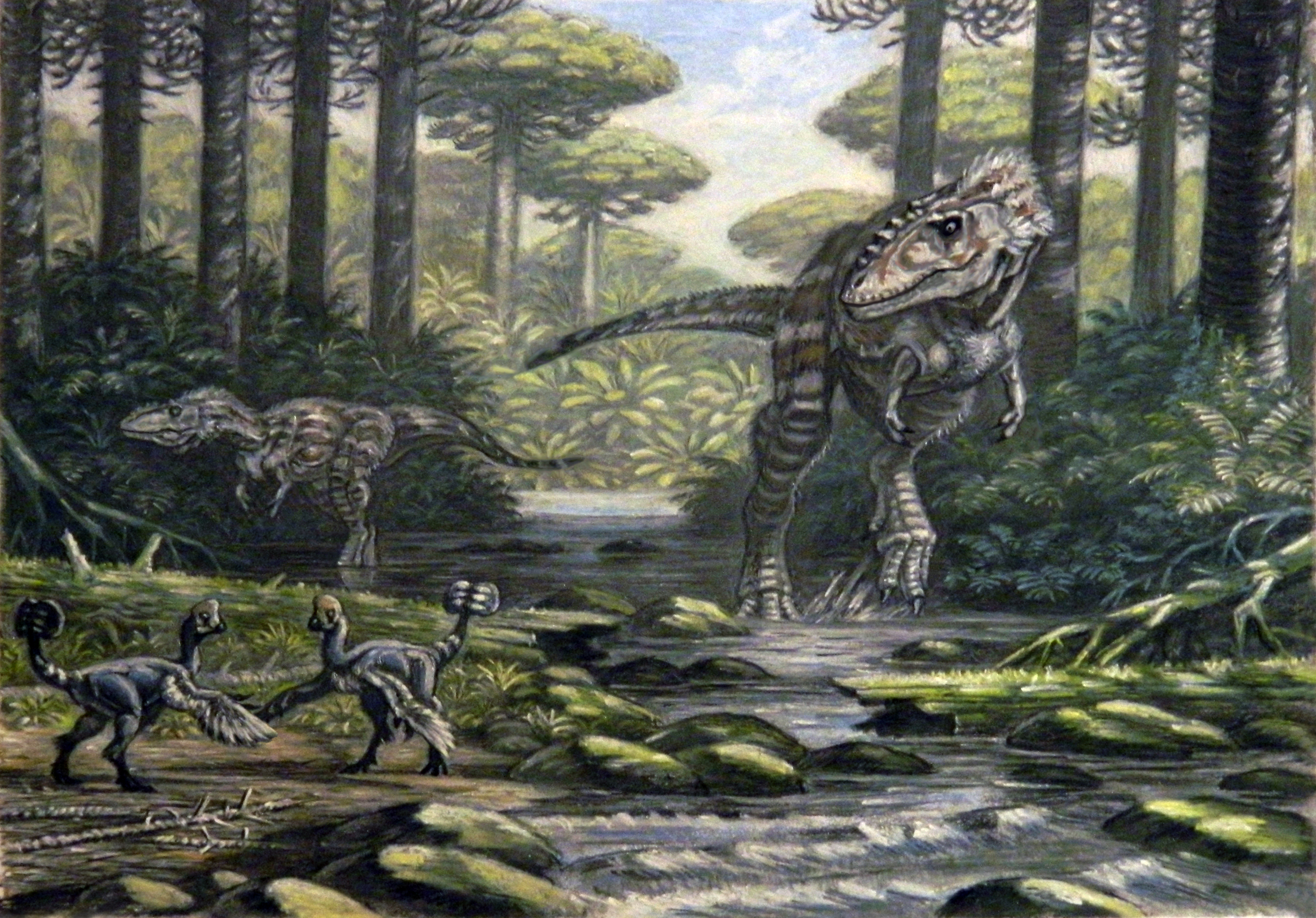
Life restoration of Alioramus with the caenagnathid Nomingia in the Nemegt Formation paleoenvironment

Alioramins, due to their relatively gracile build and long snouts, were likely specialized in hunting small-sized prey with quick turns. Such feeding strategies may have avoided direct competition with other tyrannosaurids. In contrast to robust tyrannosaurids, whose juveniles underwent drastic changes in their skull, the characteristic elongated snout morphology of alioramins was likely maintained throughout their ontogeny (growth).

Studies on the morphology of tyrannosauroid skulls suggest that alioramins experienced lower amounts of stress in their skulls when biting and feeding and that they likely did not utilize puncture-and-pull feeding like larger tyrannosaurines such as Tyrannosaurus and Daspletosaurus.

== See also ==
- Timeline of tyrannosaur research
