= Khankhuuluu =

Khankhuuluu Temporal range: Late Cretaceous (~Turonian–Santonian)
- Reconstructed skeleton including the holotype and referred specimens

Scientific classification
- Kingdom: Animalia
- Phylum: Chordata
- Class: Reptilia
- Clade: Dinosauria
- Clade: Saurischia
- Clade: Theropoda
- Superfamily: †Tyrannosauroidea
- Genus: †Khankhuuluu; Voris et al., 2025
- Species: †K. mongoliensis

Binomial name
- †Khankhuuluu mongoliensis Voris et al., 2025

Genus of tyrannosauroid dinosaurs

Khankhuuluu (/xɑːnˈxuːluː/ khahn-KOO-loo; lit. 'dragon prince') is an extinct genus of early tyrannosauroid theropod dinosaurs from the Late Cretaceous of what is now the Gobi Desert in Mongolia. The genus contains a single species, Khankhuuluu mongoliensis, known from several skull bones and two partial skeletons, including shoulder, pelvic, and hindlimb bones, and several vertebrae from the back and tail. The remains were discovered in 1972 and 1973 and first described in 1977 as belonging to the Chinese Alectrosaurus. Later researchers recognized the uniqueness of the bones, and they were eventually named as belonging to a new species in 2025. Khankhuuluu is a medium-sized tyrannosauroid with a shallow skull and long, slender legs. Its skeleton demonstrates a unique combination of anatomical traits seen in both earlier-diverging (basal) tyrannosauroids and the later-diverging (derived) tyrannosaurids.

Khankhuuluu is known from the Bayanshiree Formation, which dates to around the Turonian–Santonian ages. The formation has yielded abundant fossils of diverse dinosaurs including various theropods, ankylosaurs, marginocephalians, hadrosauroids, and sauropods, in addition to pterosaurs, crocodylomorphs, turtles, and fish. These fossils were deposited in an environment with meandering rivers.

== Discovery and naming ==
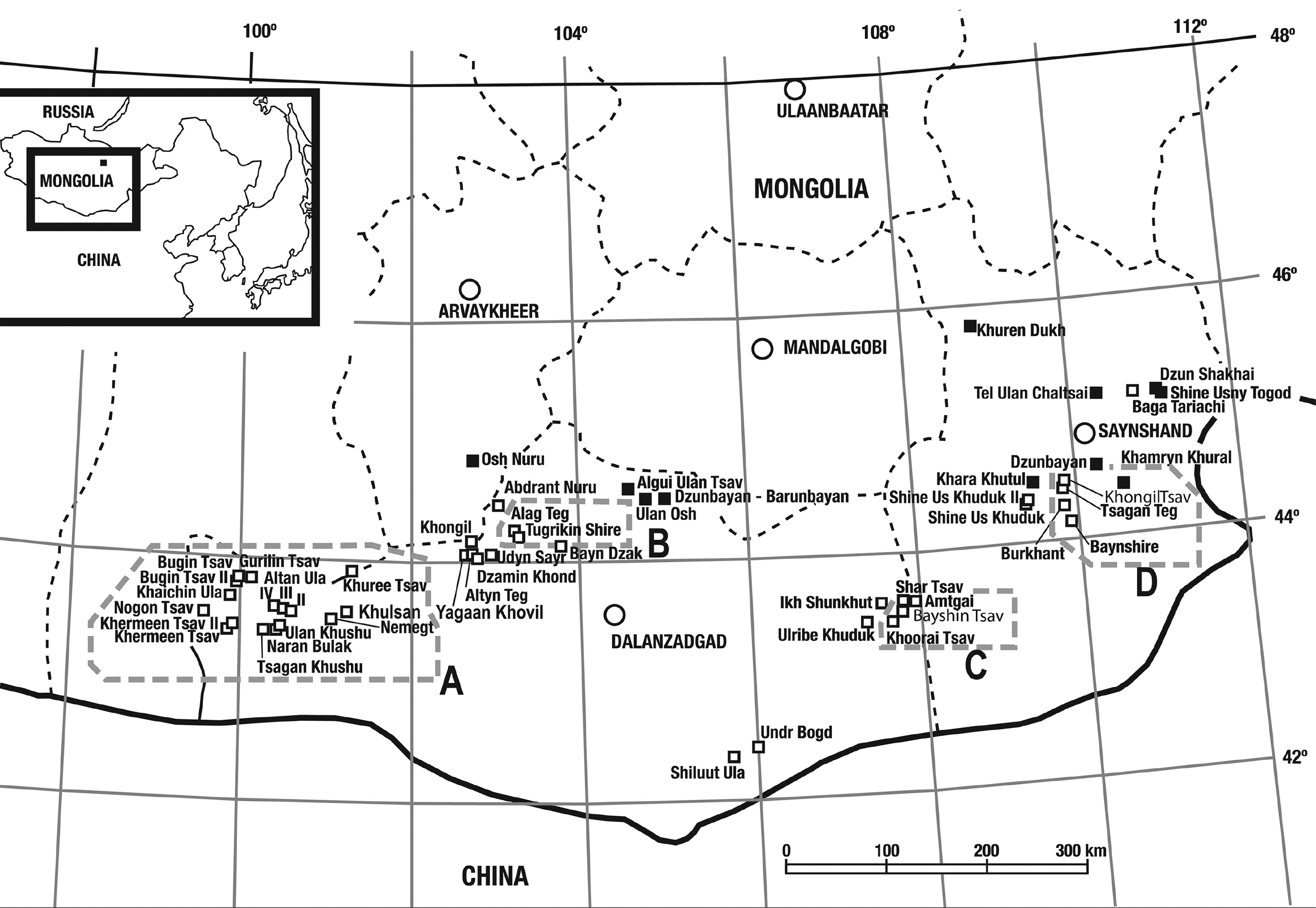
Mongolian Cretaceous fossil localities; Khankhuuluu is known from the 'Baishin-Tsav' (C) and 'Tsaagan Teg' (D) localities

The Khankhuuluu fossil material was discovered in 1972–1973 in outcrops of the Bayanshiree Formation (Baishin-Tsav locality) in southeastern Mongolia. The collected specimens are now accessioned at the Mongolian Academy of Sciences. The first specimen MPC-D 100/50, comprises a partial skeleton including cranial bones (the nasal, incomplete left lacrimal, parts of both quadrates, a vomer, and parts of both ectopterygoids and pterygoids), several vertebrae (three dorsals and the last 17 caudal vertebrae), a furcula, the left scapulocoracoid, and the left metatarsal III. The second specimen, MPC-D 100/51, also includes cranial bones (the right postorbital, quadratojugal, and quadrate), a partial left pelvic girdle (ischium and partial ilium), part of the right hindlimb (proximal part of the metatarsus and four toe bones), and part of the left hindlimb (incomplete tibia). These remains were first described by Mongolian paleontologist Altangerel Perle in 1977. He assigned them to the Chinese species Alectrosaurus olseni, known from the Iren Dabasu Formation, claiming that the bones provided evidence that these two formations were synchronous.

In 2012, Tsuihiji and colleagues described an isolated left frontal bone, MPC-D 102/4, from the Bayanshiree Formation (Tsaagan Teg region). In a separate paper published that year, Averianov and Hans-Dieter Sues described several isolated cranial and postcranial tyrannosauroid remains (later named as a new taxon, Timurlengia) from the Bissekty Formation of Uzbekistan. Citing tyrannosaur researcher Thomas Carr, they noted that the Bayanshiree "Alectrosaurus" material could not be definitively referred to this genus.

In 2025, Jared T. Voris and colleagues described Khankhuuluu mongoliensis as a new genus and species of early tyrannosauroids based on these fossil remains. They noted that several skull bones (a premaxilla, maxilla, jugal, and dentary) and a manual ungual (hand claw), originally described by Perle in 1977, could not be found to be studied. MPC-D 100/50 was established as the holotype (name-bearing) specimen. MPC-D 100/51 and MPC-D 102/4 were also referred to the species based on anatomical similarities with the holotype; MPC-D 100/50 and MPC-D 100/51 both preserve a quadrate that demonstrates two autapomorphies (unique derived traits). While neither of these specimens preserves a frontal, MPC-D 100/50 includes a nasal, which articulates with the frontal. The morphology of the contact between these two bones is consistent across both specimens, indicating they belong to the same species.

The generic name, Khankhuuluu, combines khankhuu (a Latinization of the Mongolian ханхүү), meaning "prince", and luu (from the Mongolian луу), meaning "dragon". The term "prince" was chosen to refer to the predecessory position of Khankhuuluu in the tyrannosaur lineage, relative to the much larger 'tyrant lizards' that lived millions of years later. The specific name, mongoliensis, references the country from which the fossil material was discovered. The intended translation of the full binomial name is "Dragon Prince of Mongolia".

== Description ==
Size of the smaller referred specimen (MPC-D 100/51) compared to a human

Khankhuuluu is a medium-sized tyrannosauroid. None of the known specimens preserve a complete skull. However, the cranial bones of the two more complete specimens, MPC-D 100/50 and MPC-D 100/51, suggest a total skull length between 60 and 70 centimetres (24–28 in) long. MPC-D 100/51 is slightly smaller than the holotype and has a femur 66.8 centimetres (26.3 in) long. Both specimens likely belong to mature individuals. Sexual maturity is suggested by the development of ornamentation on the nasal and lacrimal. Skeletal maturity is implied by the close of the neurocentral sutures of the dorsal vertebrae, as well as the interdigitating frontal sutural surface of the postorbital. Estimates suggest Khankhuuluu was around 2 m (6.6 ft) tall at the hips and at least twice that in length. It may have weighed around 750 kg (1,650 lb). Khankhuuluu is notable as it illuminates the evolutionary patterns of tyrannosauroid dinosaurs. While some of its anatomical characteristics are more reminiscent of earlier-diverging species, many other features more closely resemble later members of the Tyrannosauridae.

=== Skull ===
Reconstructed skull including all known remains

In profile, the skull of Khankhuuluu is shallow, comparable to juvenile tyrannosaurids and members of the Alioramini. The textured ornamentation on the skull is reduced in comparison to later species, in which these horns likely functioned as intimidation structures or mating displays. Like most eutyrannosaurians ('true tyrannosaurs', the clade including giant Asian and North American taxa such as the tyrannosaurids), the fused midline nasal bones are rugose and have many small bosses. The lacrimal has a rugose cornual process (bony protuberance), another typical eutyrannosaurian feature. However, unlike tyrannosaurids, in which this horn-like process has a dorsal component, it is strictly laterally directed in Khankhuuluu. In contrast to adult tyrannosaurids, which have a prominent cornual process on the lateral surface of the postorbital, this bone is smooth in Khankhuuluu. This is more similar to juvenile tyrannosaurids and the more basal tyrannosauroid Xiongguanlong. As evidenced by the morphology of the postorbital, the posterior margin of the orbit is round, lacking the suborbital flange seen in both juvenile and mature tyrannosaurids. While the orbit is also round in juvenile tyrannosaurids, it becomes more angular through growth with the increased development of the suborbital flange.

Although the tooth-bearing bones could not be studied for the 2025 description of Khankhuuluu, earlier publications provided brief descriptions of the material. In 2000, Philip J. Currie stated that the premaxillary teeth lack denticles (serrations). This bone bears four teeth. Based on Perle's 1977 description, he noted the surprisingly high tooth count in the maxilla (upper jawbone) and dentary (lower jawbone) compared to later-diverging tyrannosaurs; the maxilla bears 17 teeth while the dentary holds 18–19 teeth. The first two or three maxilla teeth were described as 'incisiform' (cutting). In general, the teeth are more narrow and bladelike than the 'specialized' teeth of later-diverging species. There are two rows of foramina (small holes) on the anterior (front) end of the maxilla, which merge into a single row posteriorly (toward the back). A nearly complete right maxilla referred to Timurlengia and found in the Bissekty Formation is long and shallow, and the lower margin is slightly convex. Similar to the Khankhuuluu maxilla, this specimen preserves at least seventeen alveoli.

=== Postcranial skeleton ===
The dorsal vertebrae have a centrum that is deeper than it is long and tall neural spines that exceed the height of the centra. While this is typical for eutyrannosaurians, it is different from the earlier Xiongguanlong which lacks the first character, and Timurlengia which lacks both. The postacetabular process of the ilium tapers toward the back when viewed from the side, while in tyrannosaurids it is long and rectangular. This is more similar to the earlier-diverging genera Juratyrant and Stokesosaurus. The ischium has a prominent tubercle on the posterior surface and it lacks expansion on the distal end. Both of these features are more similar to eutyrannosaurians than earlier taxa.

Among the bones described by Perle in 1977 but not located by Voris and colleagues in 2025 were a manual ungual (hand claw), likely one from the first digit, and the proximal end of a humerus. The ungual is 8 cm (3.1 in) long. These bones presumably indicate large claws and forelimb proportions compared to later tyrannosaurids like Albertosaurus. Like Xiongguanlong and later taxa, the lesser trochanter of the femur is as tall as the greater trochanter. While the tibia is incomplete, it was likely notably longer than the femur. The leg bones of alioramins, immature tyrannosaurids, and the earlier genera Moros and Dilong are proportionally similar in this sense. However, eutyrannosaurians excluding alioramins have a tibia that is shorter than, or comparable in length to, the femur.

== Classification ==
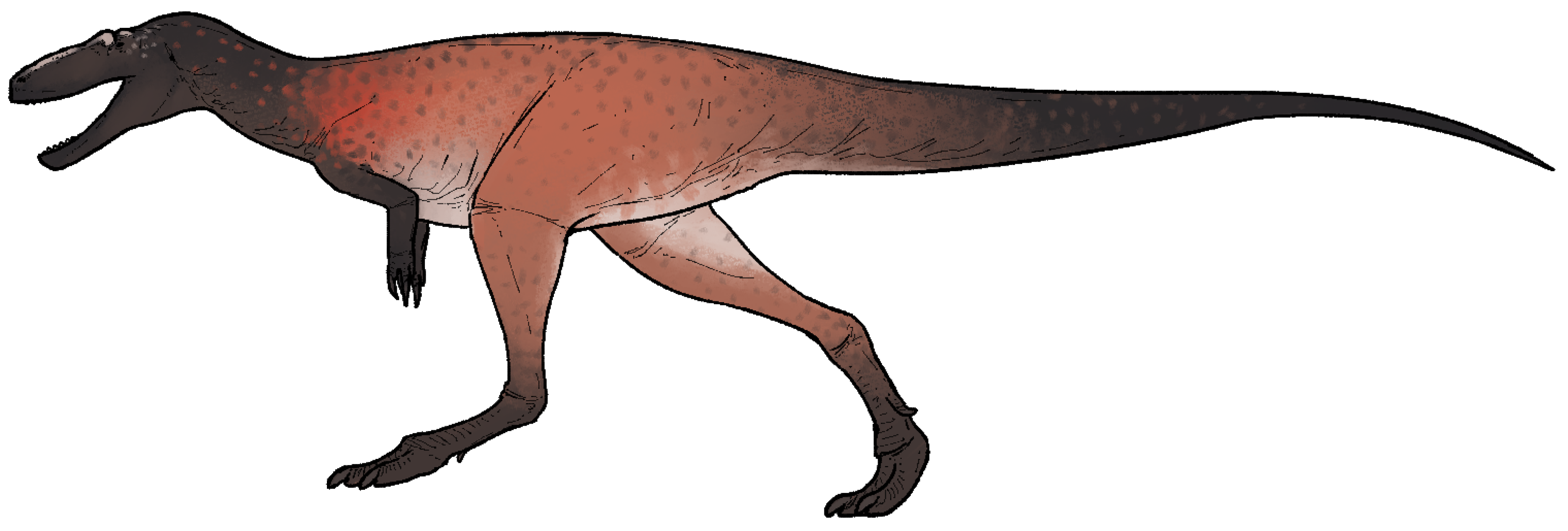
Speculative life restoration

Prior to the formal description and naming of Khankhuuluu, some studies commented on the relationships of the Bayanshiree fossil material. When included in a phylogenetic analysis, the Bissekty tyrannosauroid Timurlengia was recovered in a position similar to that later found for Khankhuuluu in its 2025 description, as a late-diverging tyrannosauroid outside of the Tyrannosauridae. In 2016, Stephen Brusatte and colleagues postulated that Xiongguanlong, Timurlengia, and potentially the Bayanshiree taxon may form a clade or evolutionary grade of long-snouted tyrannosauroids very closely related to the larger tyrannosaurids. They further speculated that these mid-sized, slender-skulled species may represent the ancestral body plan of tyrannosaurids.

In their 2025 phylogenetic analyses, Voris and colleagues recovered Khankhuuluu as a member of the Tyrannosauroidea outside of the Eutyrannosauria. Their results placed Khankhuuluu as diverging immediately after the roughly coeval Chinese Alectrosaurus, to which the remains were originally assigned. These results are displayed in the cladogram below:

- - - Juratyrant
    - Stokesosaurus
  - - Suskityrannus
    - - Xiongguanlong
      - - Timurlengia
        - - Alectrosaurus
          - - Khankhuuluu
            - Eutyrannosauria
              - Dryptosaurus
              - - Appalachiosaurus
                - Tyrannosauridae
                  ⊞
                  - Albertosaurinae
                    - Albertosaurus
                    - Gorgosaurus
                  - Tyrannosaurinae
                    - Teratophoneini
                      - Lythronax
                      - Teratophoneus
                    - - Bistahieversor
                      - - Nanuqsaurus
                        - - Thanatotheristes
                          - - - Daspletosaurus torosus
                              - Daspletosaurus horneri
                            - - Alioramini
                                - Alioramus spp.
                                - Qianzhousaurus
                              - Tyrannosaurini
                                - Zhuchengtyrannus
                                - - Tarbosaurus
                                  - Tyrannosaurus rex
                  ⊟

In their 2025 revision of Nanotyrannus, Zanno and Napoli published the results of an extensive novel phylogenetic dataset. Under both tested settings (maximum parsimony and Bayesian inference), they recovered Khankhuuluu as the sister taxon to Alectrosaurus. Under maximum parsimony, this clade also included Appalachiosaurus, while under Bayesian inference, it instead included Suskityrannus. As in the results of Voris et al., these taxa were recognized as non-eutyrannosaurian tyrannosauroids.

== Paleoecology ==
=== Age and palaeoenvironment ===
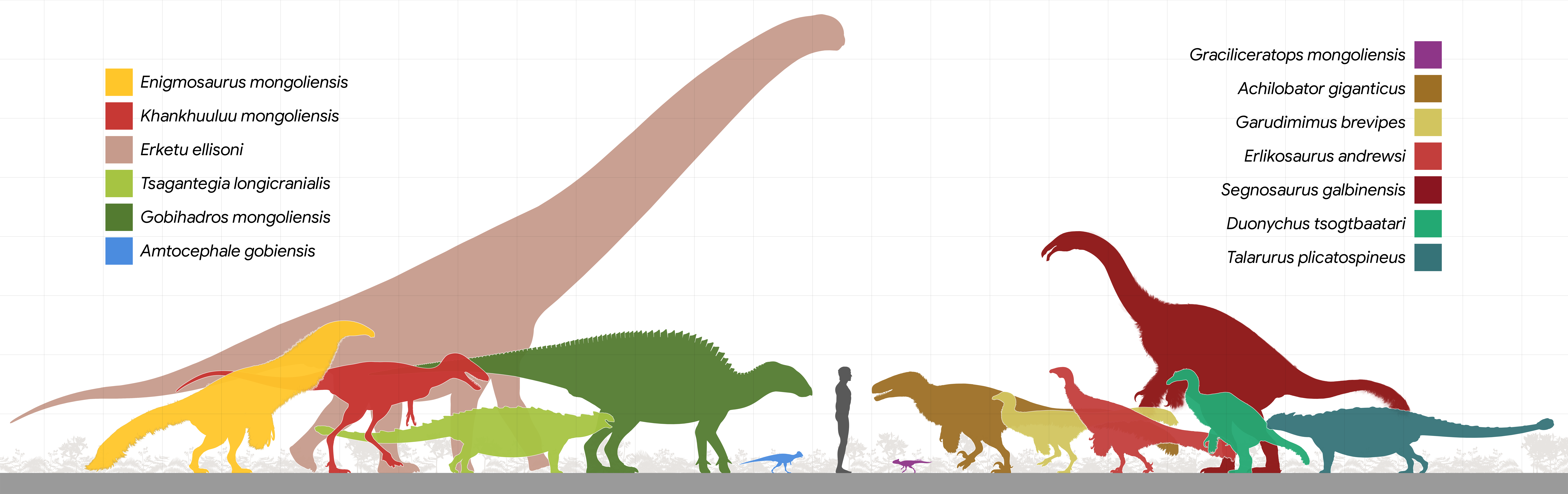
Size of many dinosaurs known from the Bayanshiree Formation (Khankhuuluu shown in red, left)

Khankhuuluu is known from the 'Baishin-Tsav' and 'Tsaagan Teg' localities of the Bayanshiree Formation. Various methods have been used to classify the age of this formation. Magnetostratigraphic techniques seem to confirm that it lies within the Cretaceous Long Normal, which lasted only until the end of the Santonian stage. Calcite U–Pb measurements estimate the age of the Bayanshiree Formation from 95.9 ± 6.0 to 89.6 ± 4.0 million years ago, dating to the Cenomanian through earliest Coniacian ages. There may be two distinct levels of the formation based on faunal differences: a lower part lasting from the Cenomanian to early Turonian ages and an upper part lasting the late Turonian to Santonian ages.

Fluvial, lacustrine and caliche-based sedimentation indicates that the Bayanshiree environment would have had a semi-arid climate, with large lakes. Largescale cross-stratification in many of the sandstone layers at the Baynshire and Burkhant localities may indicate the presence of large meandering rivers, which may have drained the eastern part of the Gobi Desert.

=== Contemporary biota ===
A vast faunal diversity is known in the formation, comprising fossils of dinosaurs and various other animals. Named theropods besides Khankhuuluu include several therizinosaurs (Duonychus, Erlikosaurus, Enigmosaurus, and Segnosaurus), the large dromaeosaurid Achillobator, and the ornithomimosaur Garudimimus. Herbivorous dinosaurs are represented by the ankylosaurs Talarurus and Tsagantegia, the small marginocephalians Amtocephale (a pachycephalosaur) and Graciliceratops (a ceratopsian), the hadrosauroid Gobihadros, and the sauropod Erketu. Other fauna include small mammals, azhdarchid pterosaurs, semiaquatic reptiles like crocodylomorphs and nanhsiungchelyid turtles, and various fish. Numerous fossilized fruits have been recovered from the Bor Guvé and Khara Khutul localities.
