= Tromerosaurus =

Tromerosaurus Temporal range: Late Cretaceous (mid-Campanian), ~76.72–76.35 Ma
- Reconstructed skull at the University of Alberta

Scientific classification
- Kingdom: Animalia
- Phylum: Chordata
- Class: Reptilia
- Clade: Dinosauria
- Clade: Saurischia
- Clade: Theropoda
- Superfamily: †Tyrannosauroidea
- Family: †Tyrannosauridae
- Subfamily: †Albertosaurinae
- Genus: †Tromerosaurus; Powers et al., 2026
- Species: †T. solumons

Binomial name
- †Tromerosaurus solumons Powers et al., 2026

Genus of theropod dinosaur

Tromerosaurus (lit. 'terrible lizard') is an extinct genus of tyrannosaurid theropod dinosaur known from the Late Cretaceous (Campanian age) of Canada. The genus contains a single species, Tromerosaurus solumons, known from at least three partial skulls and skeletons. Previous work had regarded one of these, deriving from the Oldman Formation, as belonging to Daspletosaurus, and two of them, from the Dinosaur Park Formation, as belonging to the closely related Gorgosaurus. A placement within the subfamily Albertosaurinae is preferred, though some anatomical features of Tromerosaurus are reminiscent of tyrannosaurines.

== Discovery and naming ==
Excavation of the holotype in 2010

In 2010, Stuart Plotkin discovered the remains of a tyrannosaur skeleton in outcrops of the upper Oldman Formation (quarry Q258) in eastern Dinosaur Provincial Park in Alberta, Canada. A team from the University of Alberta (UA) assisted in excavating the specimen in 2010 and 2011. The specimen is now housed in the UA Laboratory for Vertebrate Paleontology (UALVP), where it is accessioned as specimen UALVP 52981. It consists of a partially articulated, albeit incomplete, skeleton including most of the skull (missing the splenials and some components of the right half) and much of the postcranium (vertebrae from the neck and trunk, gastralia, ribs, both humeri, the pelvis, and most of the right hindlimb). Initial reports in the early 2020s identified this specimen as belonging to Daspletosaurus without discussion.

The discovery of this specimen prompted the reanalysis of two partial skeletons from the lower rock layers of the Dinosaur Park Formation, which overlies the Oldman Formation. Both of these specimens, housed in the Royal Tyrrell Museum of Palaeontology (TMP), had been previously mentioned in the scientific literature as belonging to the closely related genus Gorgosaurus. TMP 1994.012.0602, which includes much of the skull and tail, in addition to gastralia, ribs, most of both hindlimbs, and the pelvis, has been regarded as the largest and most mature adult specimen of G. libratus. TMP 1995.005.0001, a smaller partial skeleton, comprises an incomplete, disarticulated skull and an unprepared pelvis.

Skull of the holotype specimen

In 2026, Mark J. Powers and colleagues described Tromerosaurus solumons as a new genus and species of tyrannosaurid theropod based on these fossil remains, designating UALVP 52981 as the holotype specimen. TMP 1994.012.0602 and TMP 1995.005.0001 were referred to this species based on shared anatomical features with the holotype. Two isolated maxillae (primary upper tooth-bearing bones) from unknown localities were tentatively also referred, one of which (UALVP 56605) belongs to a mature individual, while the other (TMP 1985.011.0003) belongs to a small juvenile. This smaller bone was first assigned to Albertosaurus libratus in 1999.

=== Etymology ===
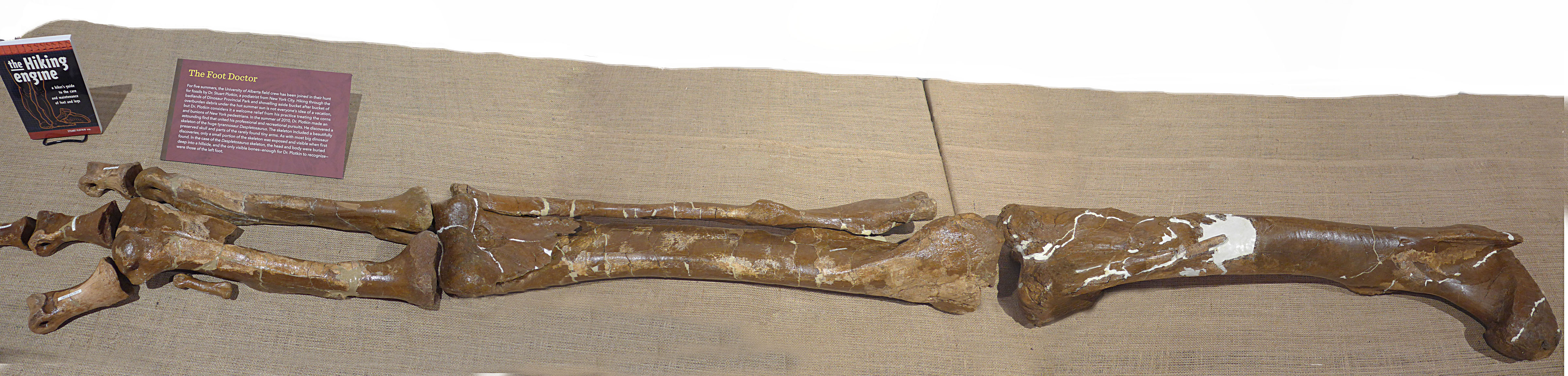
Leg of the holotype

The generic name, Tromerosaurus, is combines the Ancient Greek words τρομερός (tromerós), meaning 'terrible' or 'frightful', and σαῦρος (saûros), meaning 'lizard'. This alludes to the combination of anatomical traits it shares with Gorgosaurus (lit. 'terrible lizard') and Daspletosaurus (lit. 'frightful lizard'). The specific name, solumons, is derived from the Latin words solus, meaning 'lonely', and mōns, meaning 'mountain'. This references the anatomy of the lacrimal horn, which is isolated by a wide, flattened shelf of the bone's posterior process. It also alludes to the dragon Smaug and his lair on Lonely Mountain in J. R. R. Tolkien's 1937 fantasy novel The Hobbit, hinting at the visual parallels between dragon iconography and tyrannosaurids.

== Description ==
Size of two Tromerosaurus specimens compared to a human

As preserved, T. solumons holotype skull is disarticulated, with the components no longer in their natural anatomical placements. When digitally reconstructed, its greatest length is .9 metres (3.0 ft). The femur is longer, at .95 m (3.1 ft). This condition, with a skull shorter than the femur, is more similar to albertosaurine tyrannosaurids than tyrannosaurines, in which the skull is generally longer. The snout comprises more than 60% of the skull's length, and the skull maintains a broadly consistent depth from the snout to the back of the cranium. The braincase of the holotype is taphonomically compressed, but the braincase of one of the referred specimens indicates the temporal region is laterally wide, a feature shared by tyrannosaurines and Nanotyrannus. The maxillae of the T. solumons holotype bear 13 teeth, in contrast to the 15 teeth in the referred specimen TMP 1994.012.0602. Most specimens of Albertosaurus, Gorgosaurus, and Teratophoneus have 14 maxillary teeth, and the standard maxillary tooth count variation in tyrannosaurids is ±1. The dentary has 16 teeth, within the range of 15–18 seen in Gorgosaurus.

== Classification ==
Life restoration of Tromerosaurus

Pelvis of the holotype on exhibit

To test the affinities and relationships of Tromerosaurus, Powers et al. (2026) included it in an updated version of the phylogenetic matrix of Voris (2025).

In all versions of their parsimony analyses, Tromerosaurus was recovered as the basalmost member of the tyrannosaurid subfamily Albertosaurinae, which also includes Albertosaurus and Gorgosaurus. These results are displayed in Topology A below. This is comparable to the parsimony and Bayesian results recovered the year prior using an independent dataset developed and published by Zanno and Napoli. These researchers recovered the T. solumons holotype (then unnamed) as the sister taxon to Gorgosaurus + Albertosaurus, though the exact composition of earlier-diverging albertosaurines varied between methods.

Topology A: Parsimony analysis (k=12)

- - Nanotyrannus spp.
    ⊞	Nanotyrannus lancensis; Nanotyrannus lethaeus	⊟
  - Eutyrannosauria
    - Dryptosauridae
      - Appalachiosaurus montgomeriensis
      - Dryptosaurus aquilunguis
    - Tyrannosauridae
      - Albertosaurinae
        - Tromerosaurus solumons
        - - Gorgosaurus sp.
          - - Gorgosaurus libratus
            - - Albertosaurus sp.
              - Albertosaurus sarcophagus
      - Tyrannosaurinae
        - Teratophoneini
          ⊞	Lythronax argestes; Teratophoneus curriei	⊟
        - - Bistahieversor sealeyi
          - - Nanuqsaurus hoglundi
            - - Thanatotheristes degrootorum
              - - Daspletosaurus spp.
                  ⊞
                  - Daspletosaurus horneri
                  - Daspletosaurus torosus
                  ⊟
                - - Alioramini
                    ⊞	Alioramus spp.; Qianzhousaurus sinensis	⊟
                  - Tyrannosaurini
                    ⊞
                    - Zhuchengtyrannus magnus
                    - - Tarbosaurus bataar
                      - Tyrannosaurus rex
                    ⊟

In contrast to their parsimony results, the Bayesian results of Powers et al. (2026) placed Tromerosaurus as the basalmost member of the subfamily Tyrannosaurinae (the sister group to Albertosaurinae). These results are displayed in Topology B below. ⊞ symbols can be clicked to expand nodes. While the albertosaurine placement was preferred, these conflicting results highlight the mosaic anatomy of Tromerosaurus, with some features similar to both albertosaurines and early tyrannosaurines.

Topology B: Bayesian analysis

- Eutyrannosauria
  - Dryptosaurus aquilunguis
  - - Appalachiosaurus montgomeriensis
    - - Nanotyrannus spp.
        ⊞	Nanotyrannus lancensis; Nanotyrannus lethaeus	⊟
      - - Gorgosaurus sp.
        - Tyrannosauridae
          - Albertosaurinae
            - Gorgosaurus libratus
            - - Albertosaurus sp.
              - Albertosaurus sarcophagus
          - Tyrannosaurinae
            - Tromerosaurus solumons
            - - Teratophoneini
                ⊞	Lythronax argestes; Teratophoneus curriei	⊟
              - - Bistahieversor sealeyi
                - - Thanatotheristes degrootorum
                  - - Nanuqsaurus hoglundi
                    - - Daspletosaurus spp.
                        ⊞
                        - Daspletosaurus horneri
                        - Daspletosaurus torosus
                        ⊟
                      - - Alioramini
                          ⊞	Alioramus spp.; Qianzhousaurus sinensis	⊟
                        - Tyrannosaurini
                          ⊞
                          - Zhuchengtyrannus magnus
                          - - Tarbosaurus bataar
                            - Tyrannosaurus rex
                          ⊟
