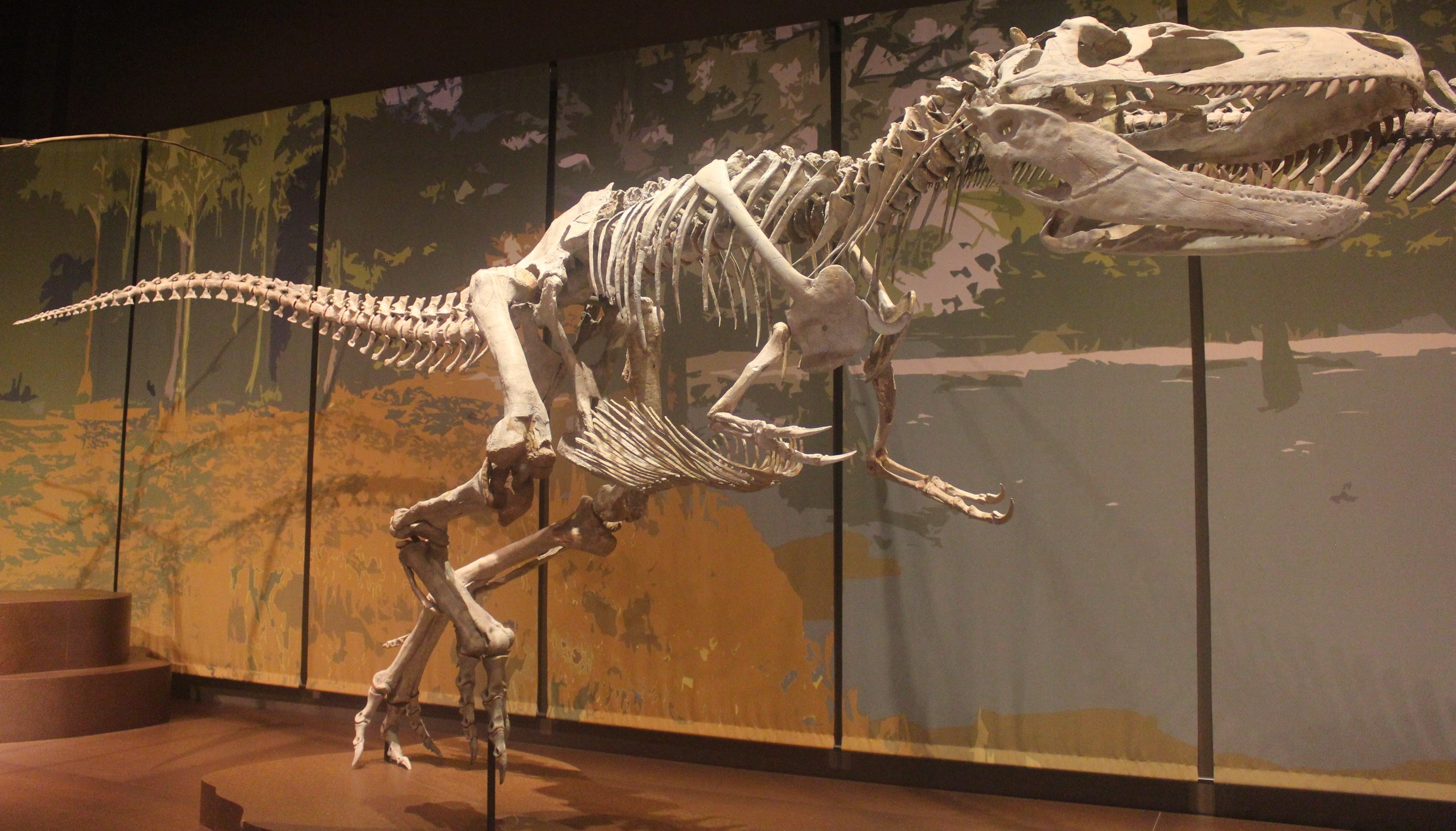
- Reconstructed skeleton, Tellus Science Museum

Scientific classification
- Kingdom: Animalia
- Phylum: Chordata
- Class: Reptilia
- Clade: Dinosauria
- Clade: Saurischia
- Clade: Theropoda
- Superfamily: †Tyrannosauroidea
- Clade: †Eutyrannosauria
- Genus: †Appalachiosaurus; Carr et al., 2005
- Species: †A. montgomeriensis

Binomial name
- †Appalachiosaurus montgomeriensis Carr et al., 2005

= Appalachiosaurus =

Appalachiosaurus Temporal range: Late Cretaceous, 82–77.9 Ma

Extinct genus of dinosaurs

Appalachiosaurus (/ˌæpəˌleɪtʃioʊˈsɔːrəs/ AP-ə-LAY-chee-oh-SOR-əs; "Appalachian lizard") is a genus of tyrannosauroid theropod dinosaur from the Late Cretaceous period of what is now eastern North America. It was a basal member of the clade Eutyrannosauria, meaning it was rather close in relation to the true tyrannosaurids such as Tyrannosaurus. Like most theropods, it was a bipedal predator. Only a juvenile skeleton has been found, representing an animal approximately 6.5 metres (21 ft) long and weighing 623 kilograms (1,373 lb), which indicates an adult would have been significantly larger.

Fossils of Appalachiosaurus were found in central Alabama's Demopolis Chalk Formation. This formation dates to the middle of the Campanian age of the Late Cretaceous, around 77 million years ago. Fossil material assigned to Appalachiosaurus is also known from the Donoho Creek and Tar Heel/Coachman formations of South and North Carolina respectively in 2007, as well as the Ripley Formation in the Hannahatchee Creek in Georgia.

== Discovery and naming ==
The type specimen was found by Auburn University geologist David King in July 1982. This dinosaur was named after the region of the eastern United States known as Appalachia, which also gave its name to the ancient island continent where Appalachiosaurus lived. Both are named after the Appalachian Mountains. The generic name also includes the Greek word sauros ("lizard"), the most common suffix used in dinosaur names. There is one known species, A. montgomeriensis, which is named after Montgomery County, Alabama. Both the genus and species were named in 2005 by paleontologists Thomas Carr and Thomas Williamson.

== Description ==
Size comparison

The juvenile specimen of Appalachiosaurus measures approximately 6.5 m (21 ft) long and 623 kg (1,373 lb). So far, it is only known from partial remains, including parts of the skull and lower jaw, as well as several vertebrae, parts of the pelvis, and most of both legs. These remains are housed at the McWane Science Center in Birmingham, Alabama. There are several open sutures between bones of the skull, indicating that the animal was definitely a juvenile. Several of its bones are crushed, but the specimen is still informative and shows many unique characteristics. Several of these have been identified in the skull and the foot claws show an unusual protrusion on the end closest to the body. A row of six low crests lines the top of the snout, similar to those of the Asian Alioramus, although most tyrannosaur species exhibit ornamentation to varying degrees on top of their snout and brows. The only remains found are from a juvenile, meaning that the size and weight of an adult is unknown. Appalachiosaurus is significantly different and more derived than another eutyrannosaur from eastern North America, Dryptosaurus.

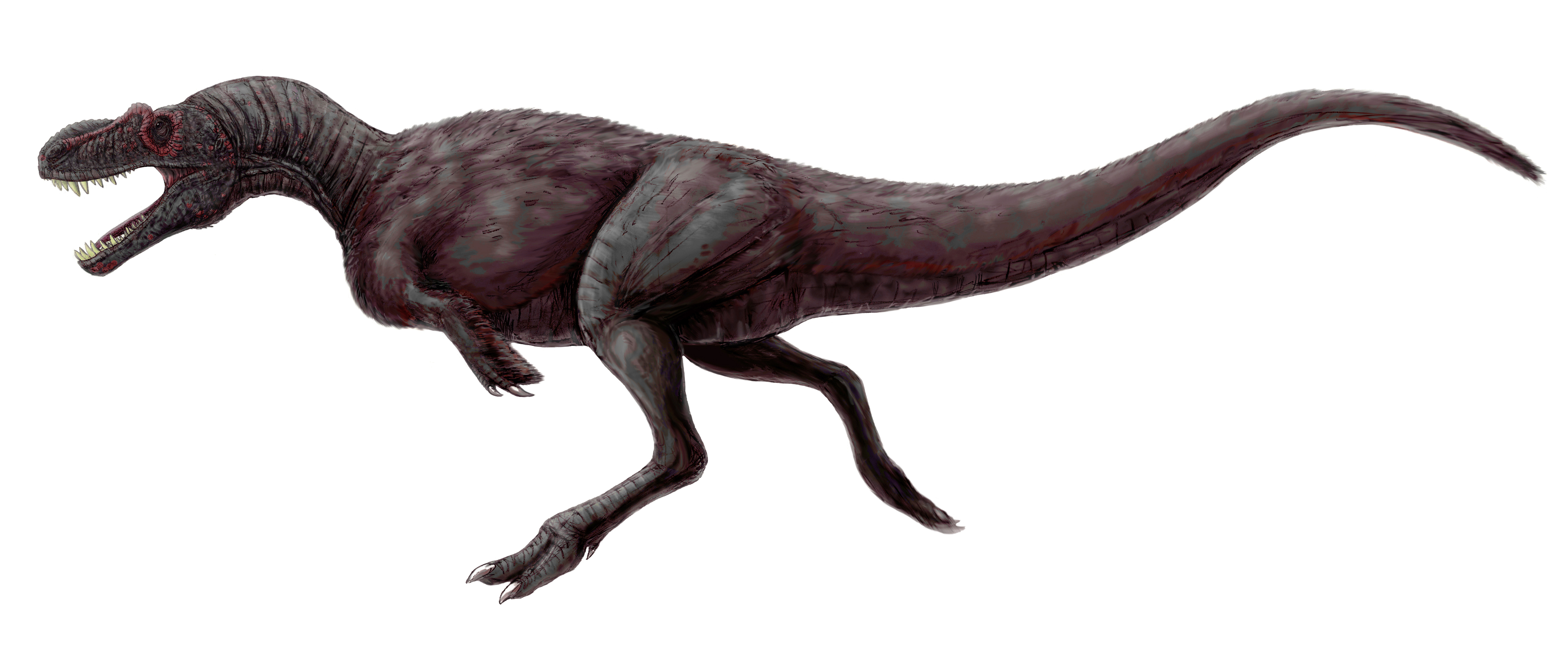
Life restoration

The arms of Appalachiosaurus are poorly known. Large tyrannosaurids are characterized by proportionally small arms and hands with two functional fingers. Although some reports of a humerus are ascribed to Appalachiosaurus, no arm material is actually known. Early reconstructions gave it long arms with three large fingers, but they are now thought to have been much shorter and have only two fingers. Museum mounts have been corrected accordingly, though other locations still support the former theory.

== Classification ==
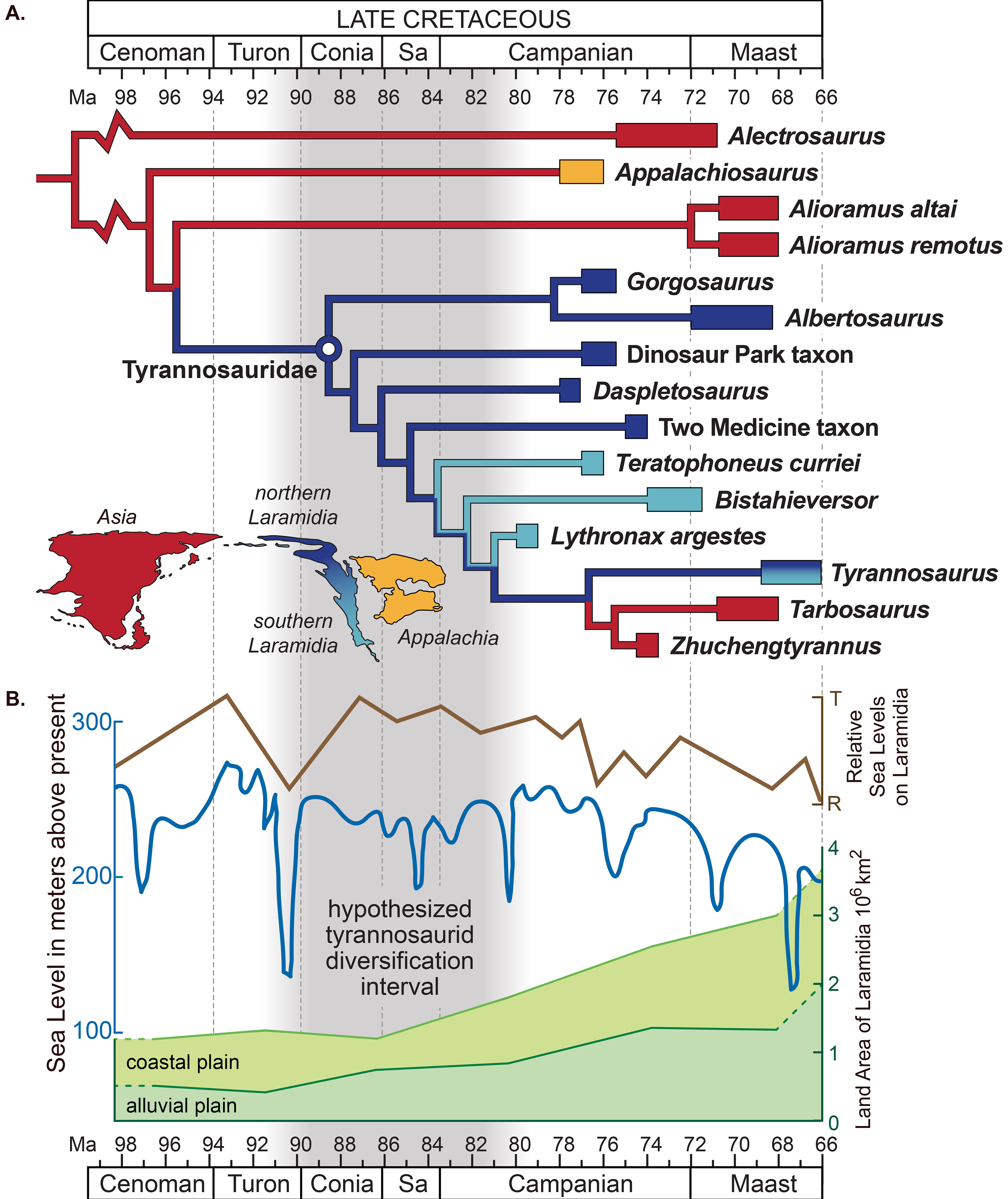
Appalachiosaurus represents the only known genus of Tyrannosauroidea to cross east of the Western Interior Seaway to Appalachia.

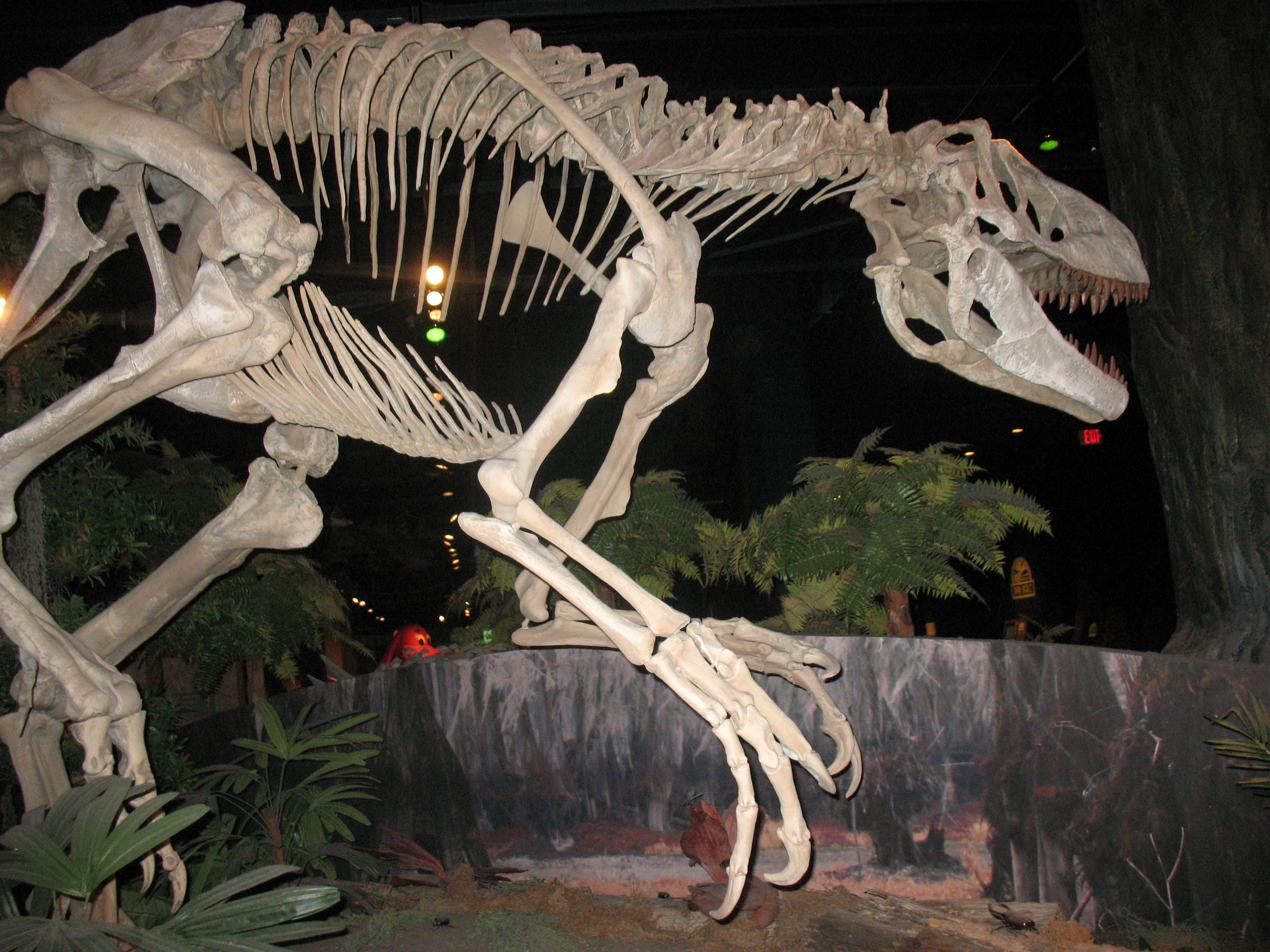
Outdated skeletal reconstruction with large, three-fingered forelimbs, based on a pubic bone earlier thought to have been a humerus upper arm bone.

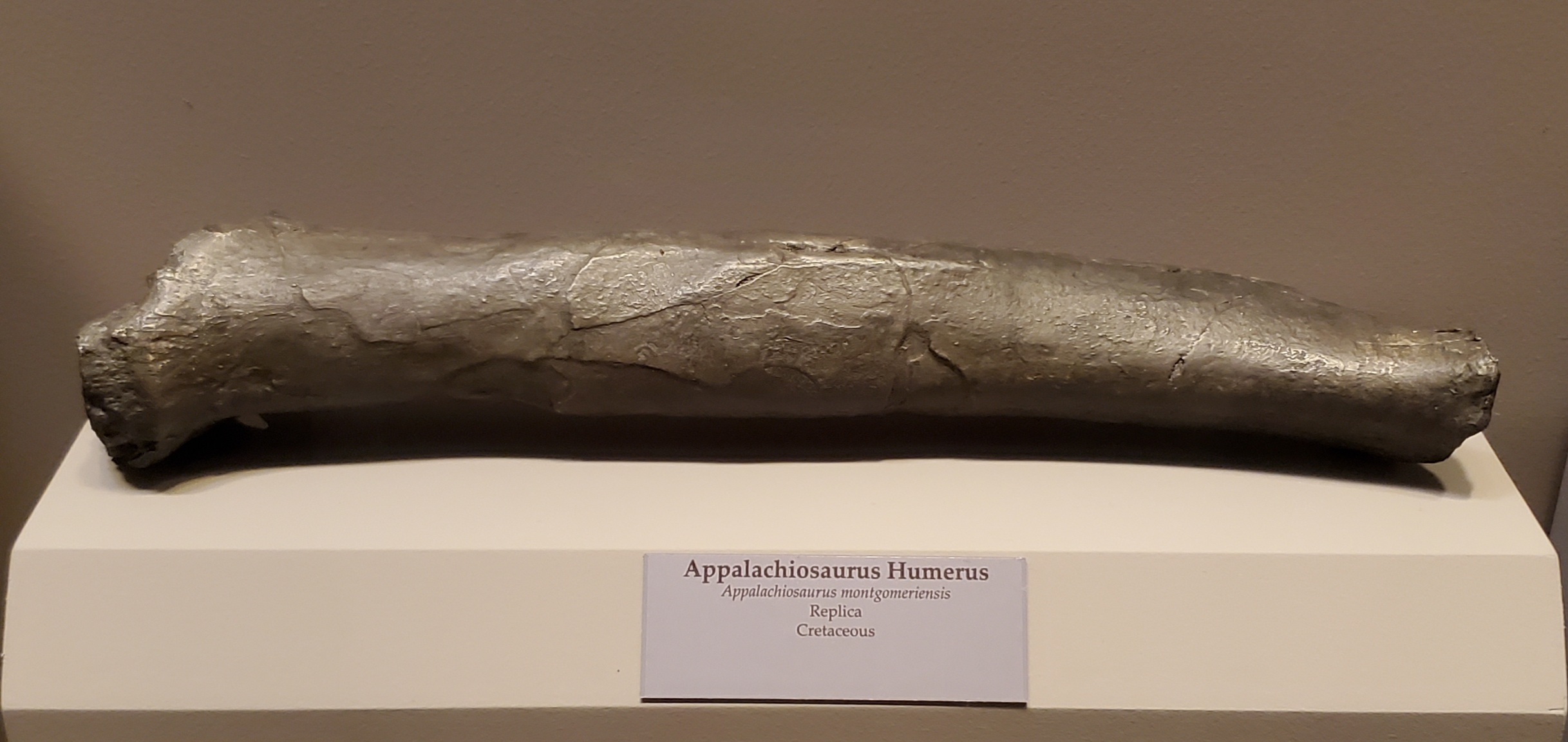
Pubic bone mislabelled as a humerus, Tellus Science Museum

The only known specimen of Appalachiosaurus was complete enough to be included in phylogenetic analyses using cladistics. The first was performed before the animal had even been named and found Appalachiosaurus to be a member of the Albertosaurinae subfamily of Tyrannosauridae, which only includes Albertosaurus and Gorgosaurus. The original description also included a cladistic analysis, finding A. montgomeriensis to be a basal tyrannosauroid outside of Tyrannosauridae. However, Asian tyrannosaurs, like Alioramus and Alectrosaurus, were excluded, as was Eotyrannus from England. Earlier tyrannosaurs, such as Dilong and Guanlong, had not been described at the time this analysis was performed. These exclusions may have a significant effect on the phylogeny.

Below is a cladogram published in 2013 by Loewen et al..

- - Dilong paradoxus
  - - Eotyrannus lengi
    - - Bagaraatan ostromi
      - - Raptorex kriegsteini
        - - Dryptosaurus aquilunguis
          - - - Alectrosaurus olseni
              - Xiongguanlong baimoensis
            - - Appalachiosaurus montgomeriensis
              - - - Alioramus altai
                  - Alioramus remotus
                - Tyrannosauridae

In their 2025 paper, Zanno and Napoli conducted two phylogenetic analyses using an extensive novel dataset focused on sampling tyrannosauroids. The first, a maximum parsimony analysis (shown below as Topology A) recovered Appalachiosaurus outside of Eutyrannosauria as sister taxon to a clade containing the Mongolian species Alectrosaurus olseni and Khankhuuluu mongoliensis. The second, a Bayesian inference analysis implementing a fossilized birth–death (BI-FBD) model (shown below as Topology B), placed the Appalachian tyrannosauroids Appalachiosaurus and Dryptosaurus as the successive earliest-divering branches within the Nanotyrannidae. The authors noted that further testing and more data would be required to support the results of one analysis over the other.

Topology A: Maximum parsimony tree (K = 12)

- Tyrannosauroidea
  - Proceratosauridae
  - Pantyrannosauria
    - - Dilong paradoxus
      - Eotyrannus lengi
    - - Suskityrannus hazelae
      - - Xiongguanlong baimoensis
        - - Timurlengia euotica
          - - - Appalachiosaurus montgomeriensis
              - - Alectrosaurus olseni
                - Khankhuuluu mongoliensis
            - Eutyrannosauria
              - Dryptosaurus aquilunguis
              - - Nanotyrannidae
                  - - Moros intrepidus
                    - N. lethaeus
                      (BMRP 2002.4.1)
                  - N. lancensis
                    - BMRP 2006.4.4
                    - CMNH 7541
                      (N. lancensis holotype)
                    - NCSM 40000
                      ("Bloody Mary")
                    - KUVP 156375
                - Tyrannosauridae
                  - Albertosaurinae
                    ⊞
                    - - Bistahieversor sealeyi
                      - UMNH VP 16690
                    - - Jinbeisaurus wangi
                      - - TCMI 2001.81.1
                        - - Teratophoneus curriei
                          - - UALVP 52981
                            - - Gorgosaurus sp. nov
                              - - Gorgosaurus libratus
                                - - Albertosaurus sarcophagus
                                  - Albertosaurus sp. nov
                    ⊟
                  - Tyrannosaurinae
                    - Alioramini
                      ⊞	Alioramus altai; Qianzhousaurus sinensis	⊟
                    - - Asiatyrannus xui
                      - - Thanatotheristes degrootorum
                        - - Daspletosaurus
                            ⊞
                            - Daspletosaurus wilsoni
                            - - Daspletosaurus horneri
                              - Daspletosaurus torosus
                            ⊟
                          - Tyrannosaurini
                            ⊞
                            - Lythronax argestes
                            - - Zhuchengtyrannus magnus
                              - - Tarbosaurus bataar
                                - - Tyrannosaurus mcraeensis
                                  - Tyrannosaurus rex
                            ⊟

Topology B: BI-FBD tree

- Tyrannosauroidea
  - Proceratosauridae
  - Pantyrannosauria
    - - Dilong paradoxus
      - Eotyrannus lengi
    - - Xiongguanlong baimoensis
      - - - Suskityrannus hazelae
          - - Alectrosaurus olseni
            - Khankhuuluu mongoliensis
        - - - Moros intrepidus
            - Timurlengia euotica
          - Eutyrannosauria
            - Nanotyrannidae
              - Appalachiosaurus montgomeriensis
              - - Dryptosaurus aquilunguis
                - - N. lethaeus
                    (BMRP 2002.4.1)
                  - N. lancensis
                    - BMRP 2006.4.4
                    - - CMNH 7541
                        (N. lancensis holotype)
                      - - KUVP 156375
                        - NCSM 40000
                          ("Bloody Mary")
            - Tyrannosauridae
              - Albertosaurinae
                ⊞
                - - Bistahieversor sealeyi
                  - Jinbeisaurus wangi
                - - UALVP 52981
                  - - - TCMI 2001.81.1
                      - Gorgosaurus sp. nov
                    - - Gorgosaurus libratus
                      - - Albertosaurus sarcophagus
                        - Albertosaurus sp. nov
                ⊟
              - Tyrannosaurinae
                - - Lythronax argestes
                  - - Teratophoneus curriei
                    - UMNH VP 16690
                - - Alioramini
                    ⊞
                    - Asiatyrannus xui
                    - - Alioramus altai
                      - Qianzhousaurus sinensis
                    ⊟
                  - - Thanatotheristes degrootorum
                    - - Daspletosaurus
                        ⊞
                        - Daspletosaurus horneri
                        - - Daspletosaurus torosus
                          - Daspletosaurus wilsoni
                        ⊟
                      - Tyrannosaurini
                        ⊞
                        - Zhuchengtyrannus magnus
                        - - Tarbosaurus bataar
                          - - Tyrannosaurus mcraeensis
                            - Tyrannosaurus rex
                        ⊟

== Paleobiology ==
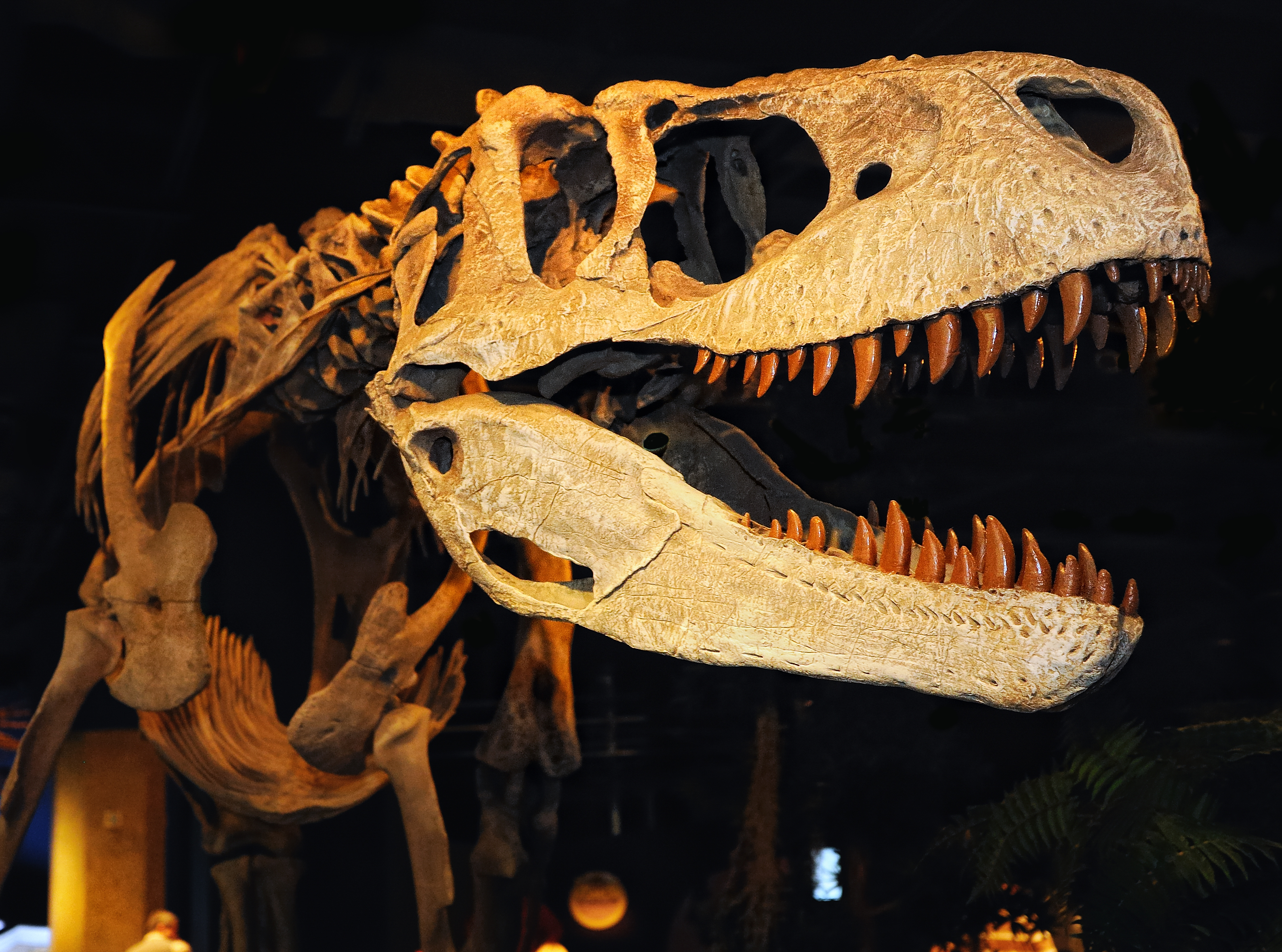
Reconstructed skull

Appalachiosaurus had a bone-crushing bite force of around 32,500 newtons, or 7,193 pounds per square inch.

=== Paleopathology ===
Two vertebrae of the tail were found to be fused together, which is possibly a result of new bone growth following some sort of minor or traumatic injury.

== See also ==
- Timeline of tyrannosaur research
