= Thomas Carr (paleontologist) =

American paleontologist

Thomas D. Carr is a vertebrate paleontologist who received his PhD from the University of Toronto in 2005. He is now a member of the biology faculty at Carthage College in Kenosha, Wisconsin. Much of his work centers on tyrannosauroid dinosaurs. Carr published the first quantitative analysis of tyrannosaurid ontogeny in 1999, establishing that several previously recognized genera and species of tyrannosaurids were in fact juveniles of other recognized taxa. Carr shared the Lanzendorf Prize for scientific illustration at the 2000 Society of Vertebrate Paleontology conference for the artwork in this article. In 2005, he and two colleagues described and named Appalachiosaurus, a late-surviving basal tyrannosauroid found in Alabama. Carr directed the Carthage Institute of Paleontology from 2004 until the institute closed on January 4th, 2026. He is also scientific advisor to the Dinosaur Discovery Museum in Kenosha, Wisconsin.

Below is a list of taxa that Carr has contributed to naming:

Year	Taxon	Authors
2020	Jinbeisaurus wangi gen. et sp. nov.	Wu, Shi, Dong, Carr, Yi, & Xu
2017	Daspletosaurus horneri sp. nov.	Carr, Varricchio, Sedlmayr, Roberts, & Moore
2012	Thylacodon montanensis sp. nov.	Williamson, Brusatte, Carr, Weil, & Standhardt
2011	Teratophoneus curriei gen. et sp. nov.	Carr, Williamson, Britt, & Stadtman
2010	Bistahieversor sealeyi gen. et sp. nov.	Carr & Williamson
2009	Alioramus altai sp. nov.	Brusatte, Carr, Erickson, Bever, & Norell
2005	Appalachiosaurus montgomeriensis gen. et sp. nov.	Carr, Williamson, & Schwimmer
2003	Sphaerotholus buchholtzae sp. nov.	Williamson & Carr
2003	Sphaerotholus goodwini gen. et sp. nov.	Williamson & Carr

== Selected publications ==
- Carr, Thomas D. (1999). "Craniofacial ontogeny in Tyrannosauridae (Dinosauria, Coelurosauria)." Journal of Vertebrate Paleontology 19 (3): 497–520.
- Carr, Thomas D.; Williamson, Thomas E.; & Schwimmer, David R. (2005). "A new genus and species of tyrannosauroid from the Late Cretaceous (middle Campanian) Demopolis Formation of Alabama." Journal of Vertebrate Paleontology 25 (1): 119–143.
