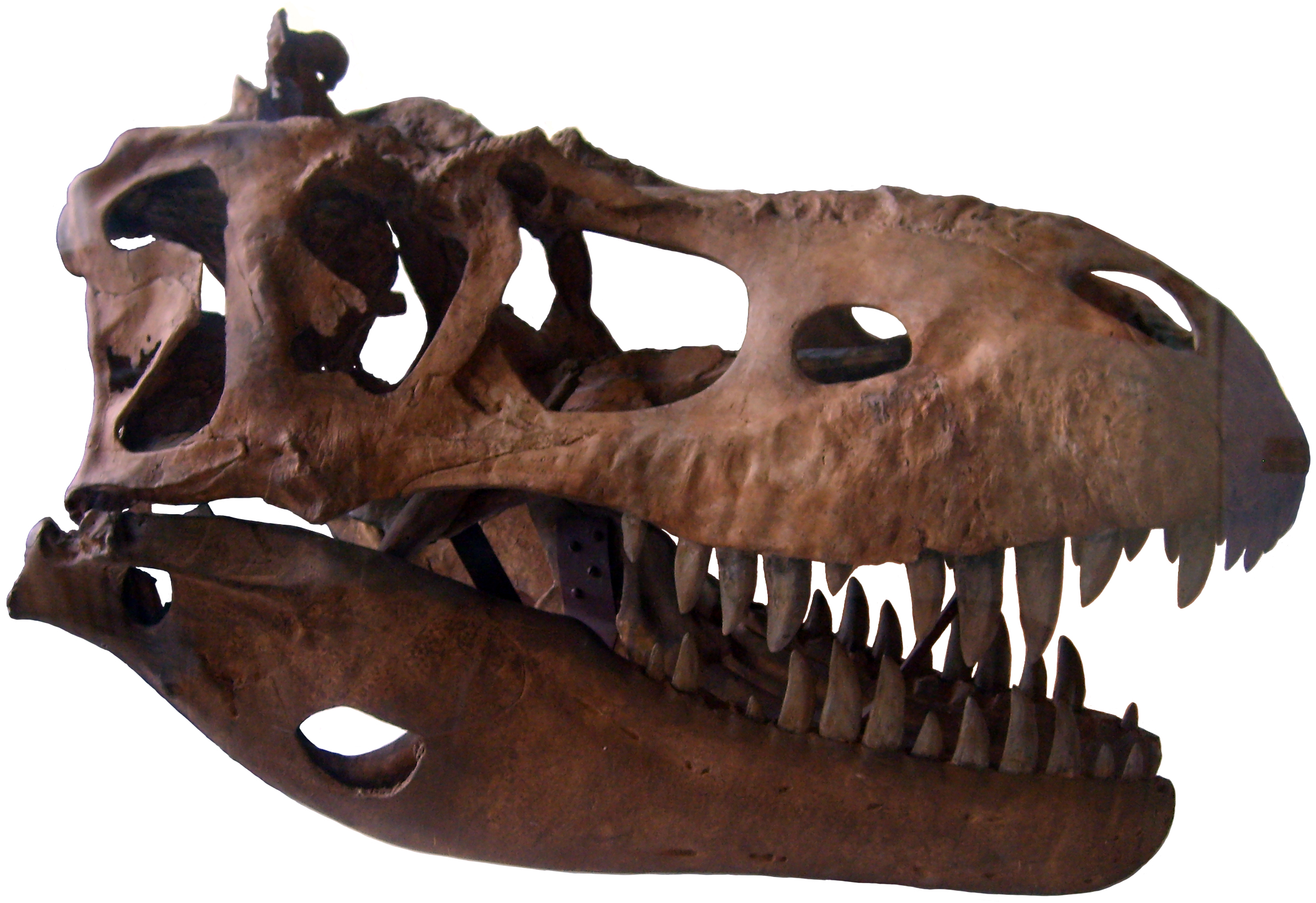
- Albertosaurus skull cast
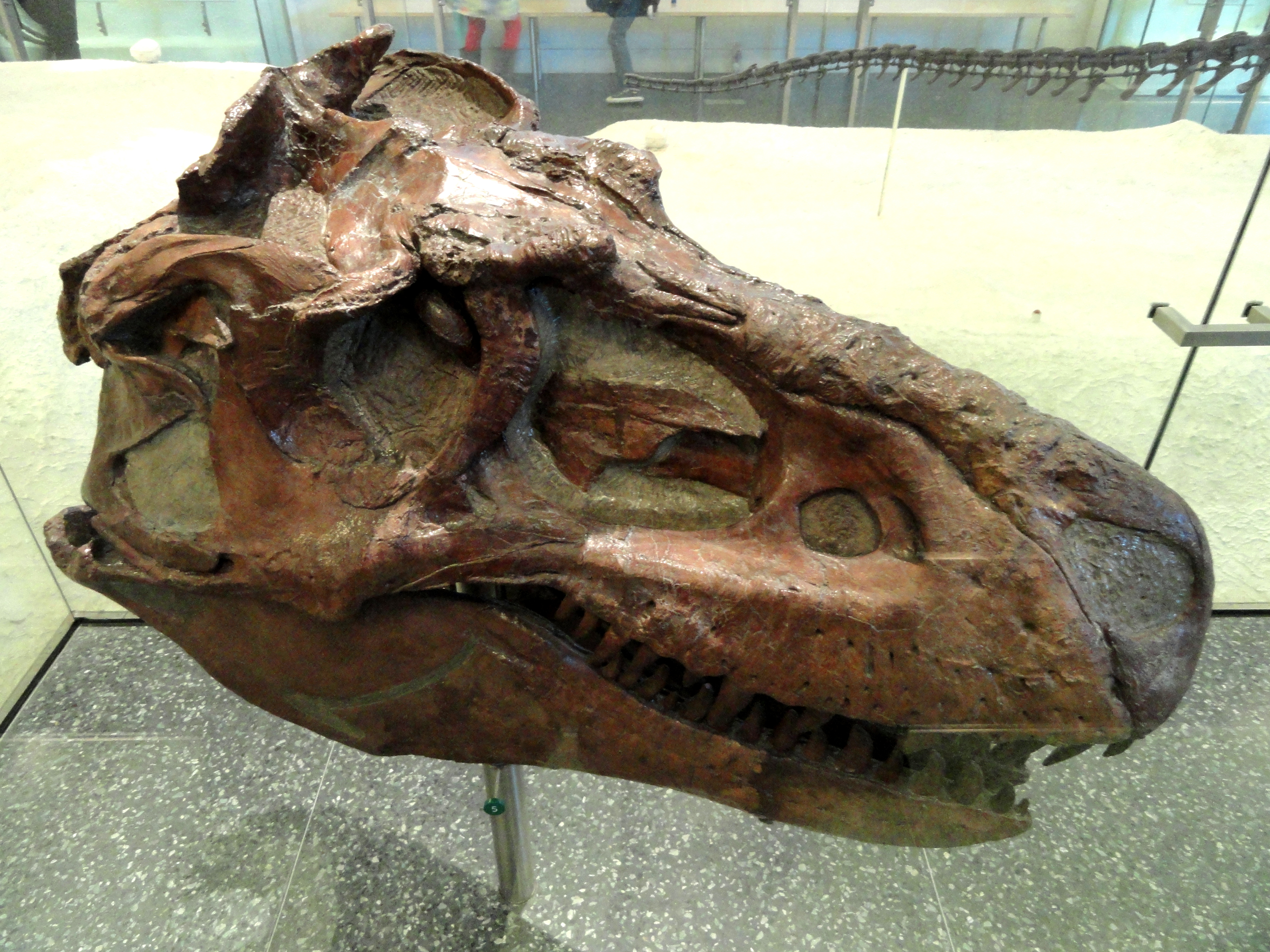
- Gorgosaurus skull

Scientific classification
- Kingdom: Animalia
- Phylum: Chordata
- Class: Reptilia
- Clade: Dinosauria
- Clade: Saurischia
- Clade: Theropoda
- Superfamily: †Tyrannosauroidea
- Clade: †Pantyrannosauria
- Clade: †Eutyrannosauria
- Family: †Tyrannosauridae
- Subfamily: †Albertosaurinae; Olshevsky et al., 1995 (emend Currie et al., 2003 )

Type species
- †Albertosaurus sarcophagus Osborn, 1905

Genera
- †Albertosaurus; †Bistahieversor?; †Gorgosaurus; †Jinbeisaurus?; †Teratophoneus?; †Tromerosaurus

= Albertosaurinae =

Albertosaurines Temporal range: Late Cretaceous, 76.6–68 Ma

Extinct subfamily of dinosaurs

Albertosaurinae is a subfamily of tyrannosaurid theropod dinosaurs known from the Late Cretaceous of the United States and Canada. The subfamily was first used by Philip J. Currie, Jørn H. Hurum, and Karol Sabath and defined as "(Albertosaurus + Gorgosaurus)", including only the two genera. The group is the sister clade to Tyrannosaurinae. In 2007, it was found that the group also contained Maleevosaurus, often synonymized with Tarbosaurus. However, this classification has not been accepted and Maleevosaurus is still considered a juvenile Tarbosaurus or Tyrannosaurus. A new taxon, Tromerosaurus solumons, was named as a probable member of this clade in 2026.

== Description ==
Albertosaurines are large, lightly built tyrannosaurids. Compared to tyrannosaurines, they are more slender and have shorter, flatter skulls, shorter ilia, and proportionally longer tibiae. Albertosaurines and tyrannosaurines share arms of about equal length, with the exception of Tarbosaurus, which had short arms for its size.

Size comparison of Albertosaurus (yellow) with Gorgosaurus (blue) and a human

Albertosaurus was smaller than some other tyrannosaurids, such as Tarbosaurus and Tyrannosaurus. Typical adults of Albertosaurus and Gorgosaurus measured up to 8 to 9 m (26 to 30 ft) long, while rare individuals of Albertosaurus could grow to over 10 m (33 ft) in length. Several independent mass estimates, obtained by different methods, suggest that an adult Albertosaurus weighed between 1.3 tonnes (1.4 short tons; 1.3 long tons) and 2 tonnes (2.2 short tons; 2.0 long tons). Gorgosaurus estimates are higher, around 2.5 tonnes (2.8 short tons; 2.5 long tons), although greater estimates exist of about 2.8–2.9 tonnes (3.1–3.2 short tons; 2.8–2.9 long tons).

All tyrannosaurids, including albertosaurines, shared a similar body appearance. Typical for theropods, tyrannosaurids were bipedal and balanced their heavy head and torso with a long tail. However, tyrannosaurid arms were extremely small for their body size and retained only two digits. The legs were long and ended in a four-toed foot. The first digit, called the hallux, was short and only the other three contacted the ground, with the third (middle) digit being longer than the rest. Albertosaurus may have been able to reach walking speeds of 14−21 kilometres per hour (8−13 miles per hour). At least for the younger individuals, a high running speed is plausible.

== Classification and systematics ==
The subfamily was first used by Philip J. Currie, Jørn H. Hurum, and Karol Sabath as a group of tyrannosaurid dinosaurs. It was originally defined as "(Albertosaurus + Gorgosaurus)", including only the two genera. This group is the sister clade to Tyrannosaurinae. In 2007, it was found that the group also contained Maleevosaurus, often synonymized with Tarbosaurus. However, this classification has not been accepted and Maleevosaurus is still considered a juvenile Tarbosaurus or Tyrannosaurus. This classification has not been accepted.

Albertosaurus is a member of the theropod family Tyrannosauridae, in the subfamily Albertosaurinae. Its closest relative is the slightly older Gorgosaurus libratus (sometimes called Albertosaurus libratus; see below). These two species are the only described albertosaurines, but other undescribed species may exist. Thomas Holtz found Appalachiosaurus to be an albertosaurine in 2004, but his more recent unpublished work locates it just outside Tyrannosauridae, in agreement with other authors. The other major subfamily of tyrannosaurids is the Tyrannosauridae, including genera such as Daspletosaurus, Tarbosaurus, and Tyrannosaurus.

=== Relationship of Gorgosaurus and Albertosaurus ===
The close similarities between Gorgosaurus libratus and Albertosaurus sarcophagus have led many experts to combine them into one genus over the years. Albertosaurus was named first, so by convention it is given priority over the name Gorgosaurus, which is sometimes considered its junior synonym. William Diller Matthew and Barnum Brown doubted the distinction of the two genera as early as 1922. Gorgosaurus libratus was formally reassigned to Albertosaurus (as Albertosaurus libratus) by Dale Russell in 1970, with many subsequent authors following his lead. Combining the two greatly expands the geographical and chronological range of the genus Albertosaurus. Other experts maintain the two genera as separate. Canadian paleontologist Phil Currie claims there are as many anatomical differences between Albertosaurus and Gorgosaurus as there are between Daspletosaurus and Tyrannosaurus, which are almost always kept separate. He also notes that undescribed tyrannosaurids discovered in Alaska, New Mexico, and elsewhere in North America may help clarify the situation. Gregory S. Paul has suggested that Gorgosaurus libratus is ancestral to Albertosaurus sarcophagus.

=== Phylogeny ===
Albertosaurinae is a basal subfamily of tyrannosaurids. They were recognized in the 2014 analysis of the new genus Nanuqsaurus, a derived tyrannosaurine. Albertosaurinae was recovered as including only Albertosaurus and Gorgosaurus. Albertosaurus and Gorgosaurus are kept separate by most classifications, as should be according to Currie. The cladogram below was found during the analysis of Nanuqsaurus by Anthony Fiorillo and Ronald Tykoski.

- Tyrannosauridae
  - Albertosaurinae
    - Albertosaurus
    - Gorgosaurus
  - Tyrannosaurinae
    - - Daspletosaurus torosus
      - Daspletosaurus horneri
    - - Teratophoneus
      - - Bistahieversor
        - - Lythronax
          - - Nanuqsaurus
            - - - Tarbosaurus
                - Zhuchengtyrannus
              - Tyrannosaurus

In the phylogenetic analyses in their 2025 reanalysis of Nanotyrannus, Zanno and Napoli consistently recovered Bistahieversor and Jinbeisaurus as members of the Albertosaurinae. Their maximum parsimony analysis also recovered Teratophoneus and other yet-undescribed southern tyrannosaur specimens as members of the group, though no such placement is found in the fossilized birth–death (BI-FBD) model, and further research is required to test the stability of this placement. In their 2026 description of Tromerosaurus, Powers and colleagues consistently recovered it as the earliest-diverging albertosaurine under parsimony (the referred placement) or as an early-diverging tyrannosaurine under Bayesian inference.

== Paleobiology ==
=== Coexistence of Gorgosaurus and Daspletosaurus ===
In the middle stages of the Dinosaur Park Formation, Gorgosaurus lived alongside a rarer species of tyrannosaurine, Daspletosaurus. This is one of the few examples of two tyrannosaurid genera coexisting. Similar-sized predators in modern predator guilds are separated into different ecological niches by anatomical, behavioral, or geographical differences that limit competition. Niche differentiation between the Dinosaur Park tyrannosaurids is not well understood. In 1970, Dale Russell hypothesized the more common Gorgosaurus actively hunted fleet-footed hadrosaurs, while the rarer and more troublesome ceratopsians and ankylosaurians (horned and heavily armoured dinosaurs) were left to the more heavy built Daspletosaurus. However, a specimen of Daspletosaurus (OTM 200) from the contemporaneous Two Medicine Formation of Montana preserves the digested remains of a juvenile hadrosaur in its gut region, with another bonebed containing the remains of three Daspletosaurus alongside the remains of at least five hadrosaurs.

Unlike some other groups of dinosaurs, neither genus was more common at higher or lower elevations than the other. However, Gorgosaurus appears more common in northern formations like Dinosaur Park, with species of Daspletosaurus more abundant to the south. The same pattern is seen in other groups of dinosaurs. Chasmosaurine ceratopsians and hadrosaurine hadrosaurs are also more common in the Two Medicine Formation of Montana and in southwestern North America during the Campanian, while centrosaurine and lambeosaurines dominate in northern latitudes. Holtz has suggested this pattern indicates shared ecological preferences between tyrannosaurines, chasmosaurines, and hadrosaurines. At the end of the later Maastrichtian stage, tyrannosaurines like Tyrannosaurus rex, hadrosaurines like Edmontosaurus annectens, and chasmosaurines like Triceratops were widespread throughout western North America, while lambeosaurines were rare and the albertosaurines and centrosaurines had gone extinct.

=== Growth ===
A graph showing the hypothesized growth curves (body mass versus age) of four tyrannosaurids. Gorgosaurus is shown in blue and Albertosaurus is shown as red. Based on Erickson et al. 2004.

Gregory Erickson and colleagues have studied the growth and life history of tyrannosaurids using bone histology, which can determine the age of a specimen when it died. A growth curve can be developed when the ages of various individuals are plotted against their sizes on a graph. Tyrannosaurids grew throughout their lives, but underwent tremendous growth spurts for about four years, after an extended juvenile phase. Sexual maturity may have ended this rapid growth phase, after which growth slowed down considerably in adult animals. Examining five Gorgosaurus specimens of various sizes, Erickson calculated a maximum growth rate of about 50 kg (110 lb) per year during the rapid growth phase, slower than in tyrannosaurines like Daspletosaurus and Tyrannosaurus, but comparable to Albertosaurus.

Gorgosaurus spent as much as half its life in the juvenile phase before ballooning up to near-maximum size in only a few years. This, along with the complete lack of predators intermediate in size between huge adult tyrannosaurids and other small theropods, suggests these niches may have been filled by juvenile tyrannosaurids. This pattern is seen in modern Komodo dragons, whose hatchlings start off as tree-dwelling insectivores and slowly mature into massive apex predators capable of taking down large vertebrates.

During growth, thickening of the tooth morphology changed so much that, had the association of young and adult skeletons on the Dry Island bonebed not proven they belonged to the same taxon, the teeth of juveniles would likely have been identified by statistical analysis as those of a different species.

==== Life history ====
Most known Albertosaurus individuals were aged 14 years or more at the time of death. However, the youngest individual known is a juvenile two-year-old and the oldest is an adult 28-year-old. The two-year-old was discovered in the Dry Island bonebed, weighed an estimated 50 kg (110 lb), and was about 2 m (6.6 ft) in length. The 28-year-old specimen from the same quarry measured 10 m (33 ft) long. Juvenile animals are rarely found as fossils for several reasons, mainly preservation bias, where the smaller bones of younger animals were less likely to be preserved by fossilization than the larger bones of adults, and collection bias, where smaller fossils are less likely to be noticed by collectors in the field. Young Albertosaurus are relatively large for juvenile animals, but their remains are still rare in the fossil record compared with adults. It has been suggested that this phenomenon is a consequence of life history, rather than bias, and that fossils of juvenile Albertosaurus are rare because they simply did not die as often as adults did.

A hypothesis of Albertosaurus life history postulates that hatchlings died in large numbers, but have not been preserved in the fossil record due to their small size and fragile construction. After just two years, juveniles were larger than any other predator in the region aside from adult Albertosaurus and more fleet of foot than most of their prey animals. This resulted in a dramatic decrease in their mortality rate and a corresponding rarity of fossil remains. Mortality rates doubled at age twelve, perhaps the result of the physiological demands of the rapid growth phase, and then doubled again with the onset of sexual maturity between the ages of fourteen and sixteen. This elevated mortality rate continued throughout adulthood, perhaps due to the high physiological demands of procreation, including stress and injuries received during intraspecific competition for mates and resources, and eventually, the ever-increasing effects of senescence. The higher mortality rate in adults may explain their more common preservation. Very large animals were rare because few individuals survived long enough to attain such sizes. High infant mortality rates, followed by reduced mortality among juveniles and a sudden increase in mortality after sexual maturity, with very few animals reaching maximum size, is a pattern observed in many modern large mammals, including elephants, African buffalo, and rhinoceros. The same pattern is also seen in other tyrannosaurids. The comparison with modern animals and other tyrannosaurids lends support to this life history hypothesis, but bias in the fossil record may still play a large role, especially since more than two-thirds of all Albertosaurus specimens are known from one locality. Albertosaurus and Gorgosaurus individuals both grow the most rapidly during a four-year period until they are approximately 16.

==== Pack behaviour ====
The Dry Island bonebed discovered by Barnum Brown and his crew contains the remains of 22 Albertosaurus, which is the most individuals found in one locality of any large Cretaceous theropod and the second-most of any large theropod dinosaur behind the Allosaurus assemblage at the Cleveland-Lloyd Dinosaur Quarry in Utah. The group seems to be composed of one very old adult, eight adults between 17 and 23 years old, seven sub-adults undergoing their rapid growth phases at between 12 and 16 years old, and six juveniles between the ages of 2 and 11 years that had not yet reached the growth phase.

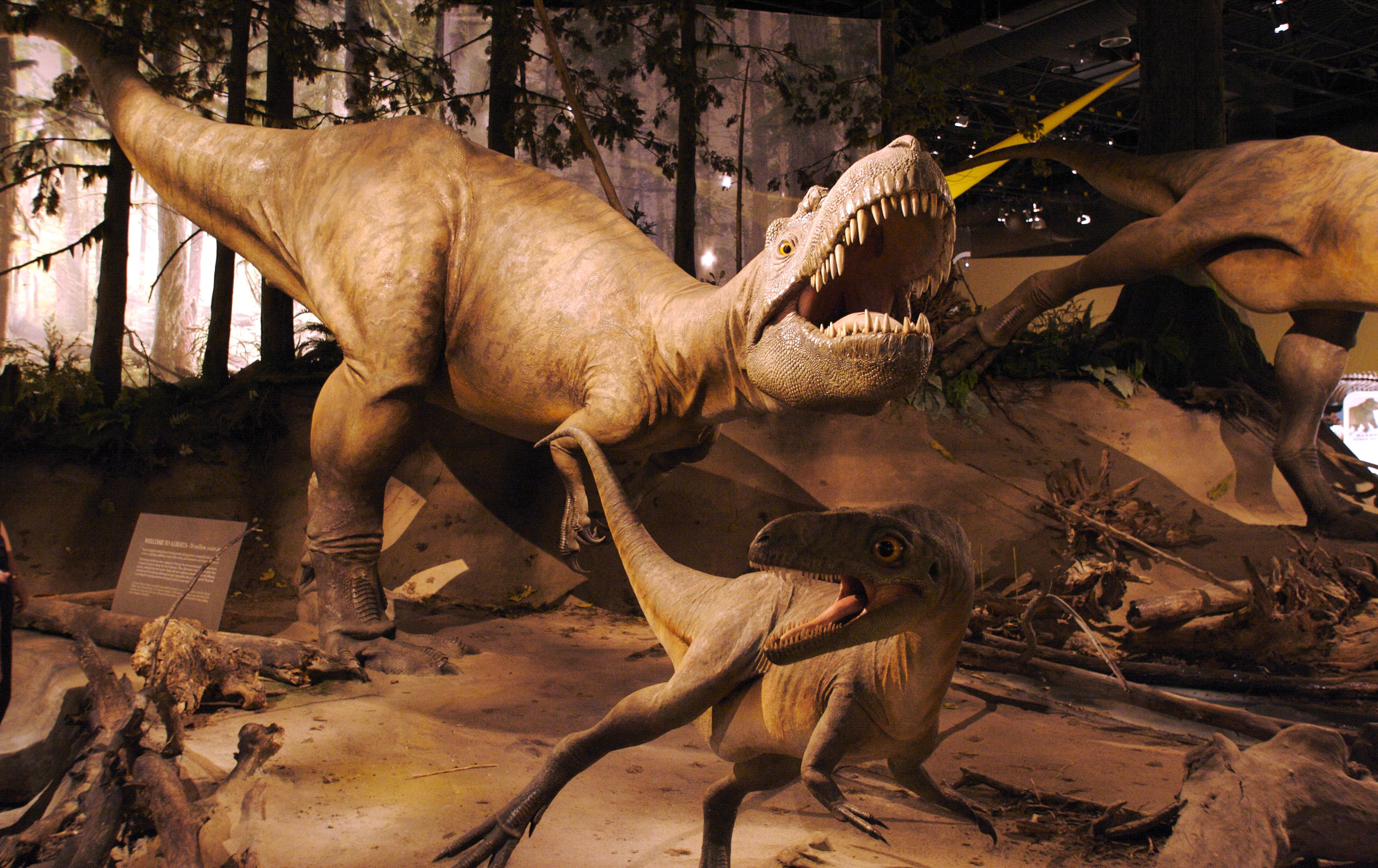
Bronze sculptures of a pack of Albertosaurus, Royal Tyrell Museum, designed by Brian Cooley in 2007

The near-absence of herbivore remains and the similar state of preservation common to the many individuals at the Albertosaurus bonebed quarry led Currie to conclude that the locality was not a predator trap like the La Brea Tar Pits in California and that all of the preserved animals died at the same time. Currie claims this as evidence of pack behaviour. Other scientists are skeptical, observing that the animals may have been driven together by a drought, flood, or for other reasons.

There is plentiful evidence for gregarious behaviour among herbivorous dinosaurs, including ceratopsians and hadrosaurs. However, only rarely are so many dinosaurian predators found at the same site. Small theropods like Deinonychus, Coelophysis, and Megapnosaurus (Syntarsus rhodesiensis) have been found in aggregations, as have larger predators like Allosaurus and Mapusaurus. There is some evidence of gregarious behaviour in other tyrannosaurids as well. Fragmentary remains of smaller individuals were found alongside "Sue," the Tyrannosaurus mounted in the Field Museum of Natural History in Chicago, and a bonebed in the Two Medicine Formation of Montana contains at least three specimens of Daspletosaurus preserved alongside several hadrosaurs. These findings may corroborate the evidence for social behaviour in Albertosaurus, although some or all of the above localities may represent temporary or unnatural aggregations. Others have speculated that, instead of social groups, at least some of these finds represent Komodo dragon-like mobbing of carcasses, where aggressive competition leads to some of the predators being killed and cannibalized. Even though Albertosaurus are commonly found in packs, there is no evidence of group behavior in the close relative Gorgosaurus.

== See also ==
- Timeline of tyrannosaur research
