= Jinbeisaurus =

Jinbeisaurus Temporal range: Late Cretaceous, 99–71 Ma
- Holotype skull (SMG V0003), National Natural History Museum of China

Scientific classification
- Kingdom: Animalia
- Phylum: Chordata
- Class: Reptilia
- Clade: Dinosauria
- Clade: Saurischia
- Clade: Theropoda
- Clade: Tyrannoraptora
- Superfamily: †Tyrannosauroidea
- Clade: †Pantyrannosauria
- Genus: †Jinbeisaurus; Wu et al., 2020

Type species
- †Jinbeisaurus wangi Wu et al., 2020

Extinct genus of dinosaurs

Jinbeisaurus (meaning "northern Shanxi Province lizard" after Shanxi Province in China) is an extinct genus of tyrannosauroid dinosaurs from the Upper Cretaceous Huiquanpu Formation of Shanxi Province in China. The type and only species is Jinbeisaurus wangi. It is the first non-avian theropod named from Shanxi.

== Description ==
It is known from holotype specimen SMG V0003, including both maxillae, a partial right dentary, two cervical centra, five dorsal centra, and a partial right pubis. It can be distinguished from other tyrannosaurs by several features of the maxilla, teeth, and pubis.

== Classification ==
In their 2020 description of Jinbeisaurus, Wu et al. identified the holotype as likely belonging to an adult individual. Their phylogenetic analysis supported a position more derived than related tyrannosauroids such as Xiongguanlong and Suskityrannus but more basal than the Tyrannosauridae. In their 2025 description of the early-diverging tyrannosauroid Khankhuuluu, Voris and colleagues reinterpreted the Jinbeisaurus holotype as belonging to a juvenile or immature individual. Their analyses suggested it is an immature form of a late-diverging tyrannosaurine. In their 2025 paper regarding the validity of Nanotyrannus, Zanno and Napoli consistently recovered Jinbeisaurus along with Bistahieversor as basal albertosaurines.

== See also ==
- Timeline of tyrannosaur research
