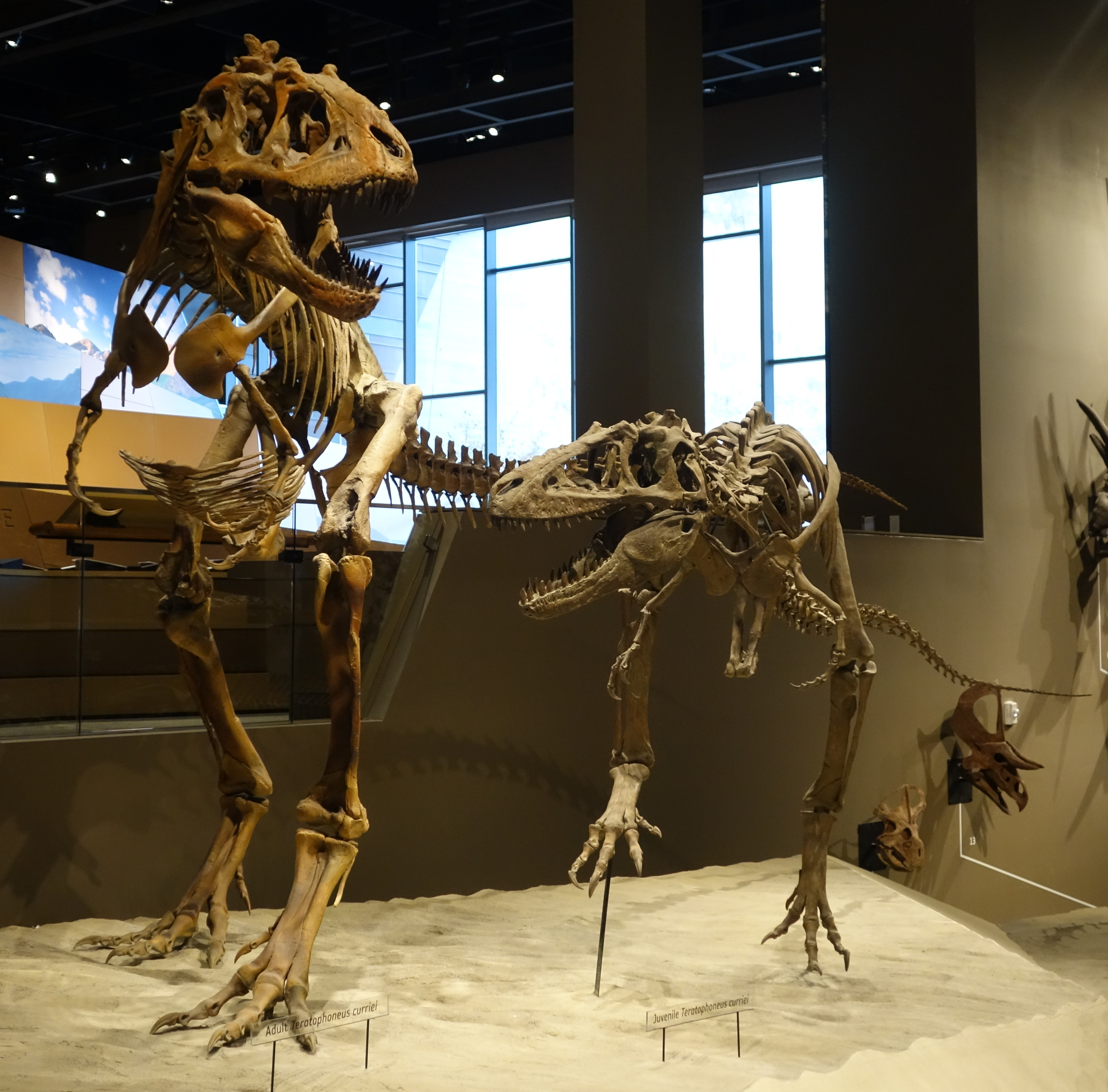
- Reconstructed adult and juvenile skeletons, Natural History Museum of Utah

Scientific classification
- Kingdom: Animalia
- Phylum: Chordata
- Class: Reptilia
- Clade: Dinosauria
- Clade: Saurischia
- Clade: Theropoda
- Superfamily: †Tyrannosauroidea
- Family: †Tyrannosauridae
- Subfamily: †Tyrannosaurinae
- Tribe: †Teratophoneini
- Genus: †Teratophoneus; Carr et al., 2011

Type species
- †Teratophoneus curriei Carr et al., 2011

= Teratophoneus =

Teratophoneus Temporal range: Late Cretaceous (Campanian), 76.5–75.5 Ma

Extinct genus of dinosaurs

Teratophoneus ("monstrous murderer"; Greek: teras, "monster" and phoneus, "murderer") is a genus of tyrannosaurine theropod dinosaur that lived during the late Campanian age of the Late Cretaceous period, (about 76.5 to 75.5 million years ago) in what is now Utah. It contains a single known species, T. curriei, named in honor of paleontologist Philip J. Currie. It is known from an incomplete skull and postcranial skeleton recovered from the Kaiparowits Formation.

== Discovery and naming ==
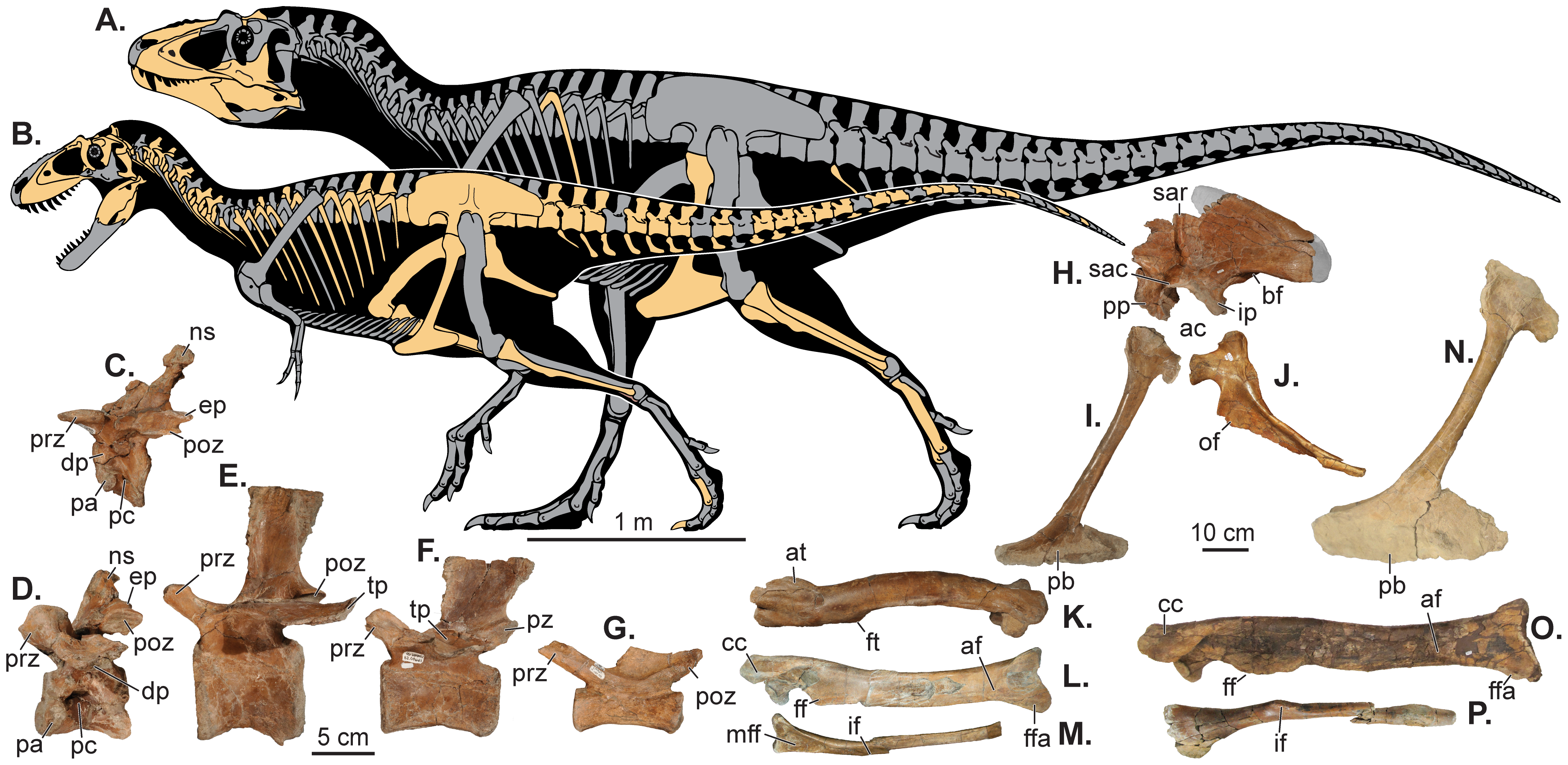
Skeletal diagrams showing holotype remains of Lythronax (A) and a Teratophoneus specimen (B). C–M show selected bones of the latter

Fossils of Teratophoneus were first found in the Kaiparowits Formation of southern Utah. Later, fossils from the same formation were discovered and identified as the genus. Argon-argon radiometric dating indicates that the Kaiparowits Formation was deposited between 76.1 and 74.0 million years ago, during the Campanian age of the Late Cretaceous period. This date means that Teratophoneus lived in the middle of the Campanian age.

Several fossils of Teratophoneus have been found. Originally, Teratophoneus was described based on the holotype specimen BYU 8120. More recently, the specimens UMNH VP 16690 and UMNP VP 16691 have been assigned to it. In 2017, a new specimen of Teratophoneus was discovered in the Grand Staircase-Escalante National Monument and airlifted to the Natural History Museum of Utah in Salt Lake City. Later, in 2021, fossils belonging to 4 or 5 individuals were described in the same study.

Teratophoneus was named by Thomas D. Carr, Thomas E. Williamson, Brooks B. Britt, and Ken Stadtman in 2011. The type and only species was named T. curriei. The generic name is derived from the Greek words teras, meaning "monster", and phoneus, meaning "murderer." The specific name honors Philip J. Currie.

== Description ==
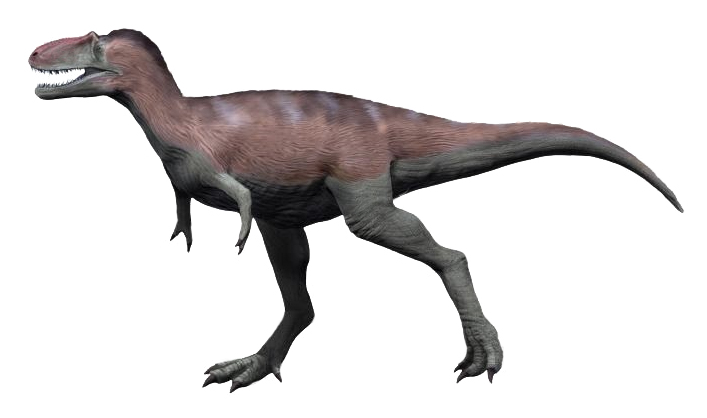
Life restoration

The holotype of Teratophoneus consists of a fragmentary skull and parts of a postcranial skeleton. The fossils were originally assigned to four different individuals, but are probably only of a single subadult animal. The specimen of Teratophoneus was not fully grown. According to an estimate by Carr et al., it was about 6 meters (20 ft) long and 667 kg (1,470 lb). However, this is likely an underestimate. In 2016, Gregory S. Paul gave an estimation of 8 meters (26 ft) long and 2.5 t (2.8 short tons) for the maximum adult size. In 2021, based on the size of the frontal bone (similar to that of Lythronax), Yun moderated the size of the subadult at approximately 6.1 m (20 ft) long and 1 t (1.1 short tons). That same year, the length of the only known articulated specimen, UMNH VP 21100, was measured at 7.6 m (25 ft) and the maximum adult length of Teratophoneus was estimated at 8.7 m (29 ft).

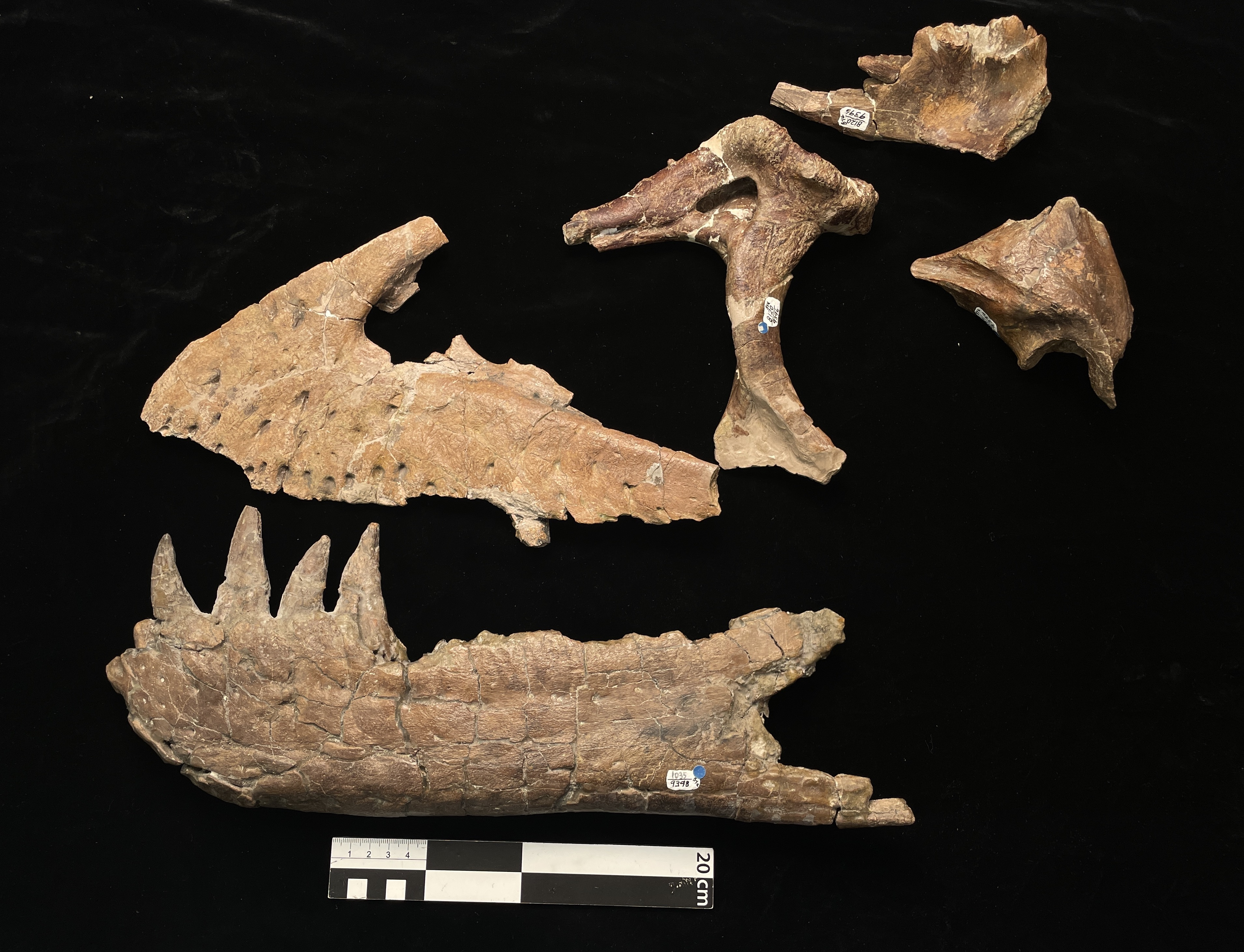
Photograph of the holotype skull bones of Teratophoneus

Compared to the skull of Albertosaurus, Teratophoneus is roughly twenty-three percent shorter in proportion between the lacrimal bone of the antorbital fenestra and the tip of the snout. The skull of Teratophoneus is also comparably deeper. It is unclear if there was a specific reason for these differences, but the extra depth may have allowed for stronger jaw muscles, thus increasing the bite force of Teratophoneus.

== Classification ==
Loewen et al. (2013) conducted a phylogenetic analysis of the family Tyrannosauridae and confirmed the assignment of Teratophoneus to the tyrannosaurid subfamily Tyrannosaurinae. They concluded that Teratophoneus was closely related to both Tarbosaurus and Tyrannosaurus, but placed it in a more basal position within the family, though it was more derived than Daspletosaurus.

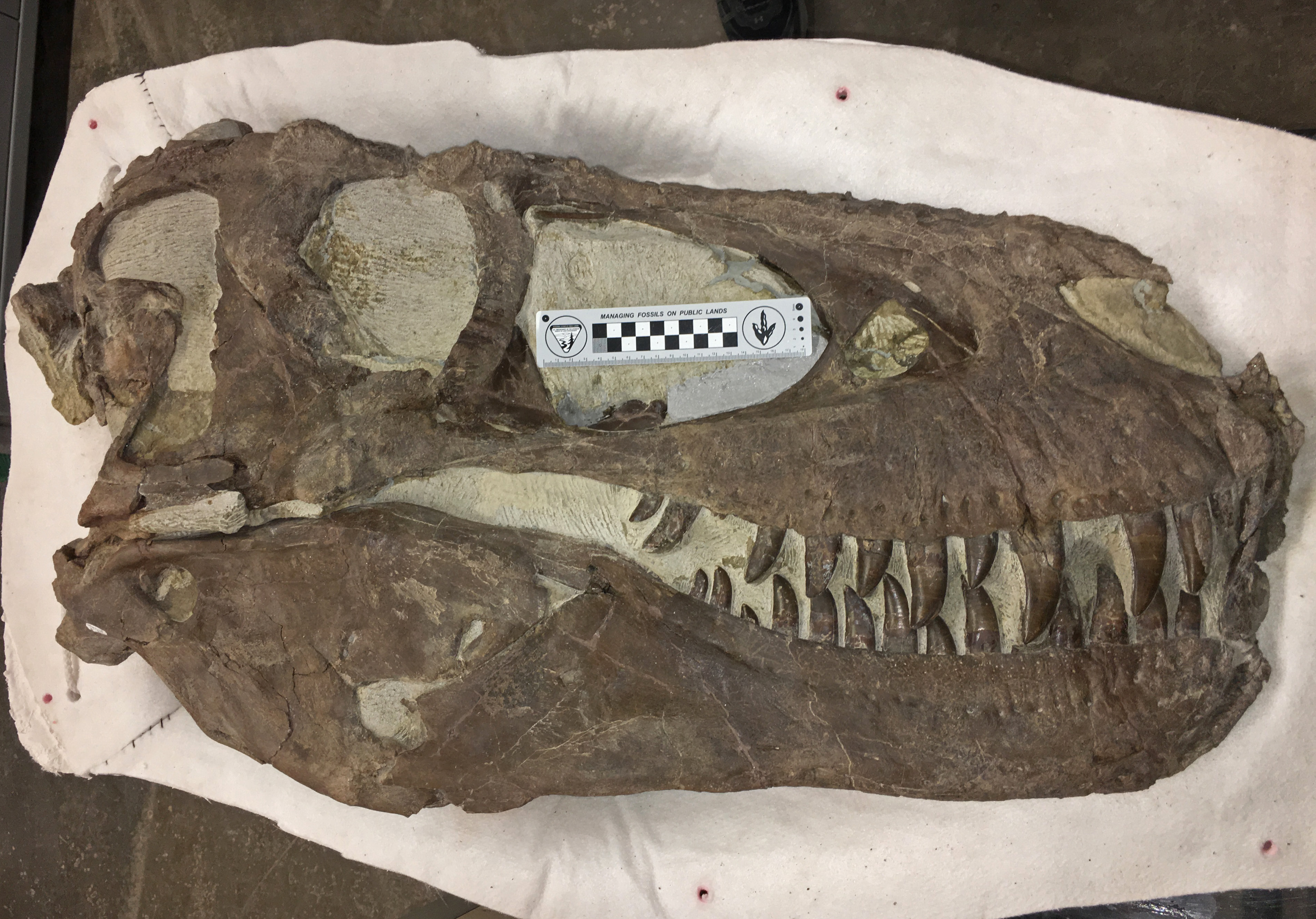
Skull nicknamed "Hollywood", also known as Ouroboros/Boris

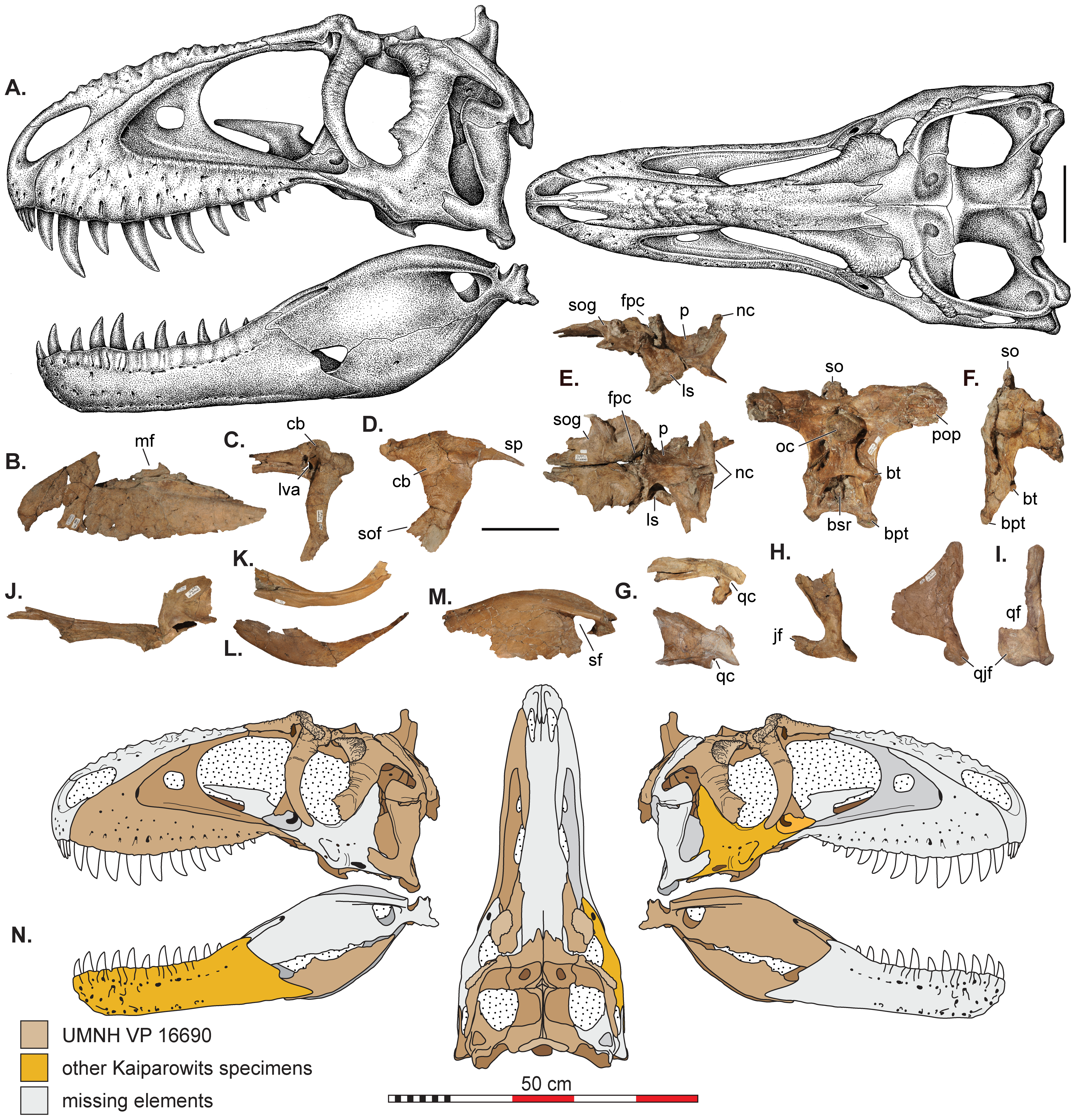
Restored skull and fossils

Below is the cladogram based on the phylogenetic analysis conducted by Loewen et al. in 2013.

- Tyrannosauridae
  - - Gorgosaurus libratus
    - Albertosaurus sarcophagus
  - Tyrannosaurinae
    - Dinosaur Park tyrannosaurid
    - - Daspletosaurus torosus
      - - Two Medicine tyrannosaurid (Daspletosaurus horneri)
        - - Teratophoneus curriei
          - - Bistahieversor sealeyi
            - - Lythronax argestes
              - - Tyrannosaurus rex
                - - Tarbosaurus bataar
                  - Zhuchengtyrannus magnus

In 2020, when describing the genus Thanatotheristes, Voris et al., 2020 found Teratophoneus to be in a subclade alongside Dynamoterror and Lythronax. This clade was named the Teratophoneini in 2024.

- Eutyrannosauria
  - - Dryptosaurus aquilunguis
    - - Appalachiosaurus montgomeriensis
      - - Bistahieversor sealeyi
        - - Tyrannosauridae
            - Albertosaurinae
              - Gorgosaurus libratus
              - Albertosaurus sarcophagus
            - Tyrannosaurinae
              - Alioramini
                - Qianzhousaurus sinensis
                - - Alioramus remotus
                  - Alioramus altai
              - - - Teratophoneus curriei
                  - Dynamoterror dynastes
                  - Lythronax argestes
                - - Nanuqsaurus hoglundi
                  - - - Daspletosaurini
                        - Thanatotheristes degrootorum
                        - - Daspletosaurus torosus
                          - Daspletosaurus horneri
                      - - Zhuchengtyrannus magnus
                        - - Tarbosaurus bataar
                          - Tyrannosaurus rex

== Paleobiology ==
=== Social Behavior ===
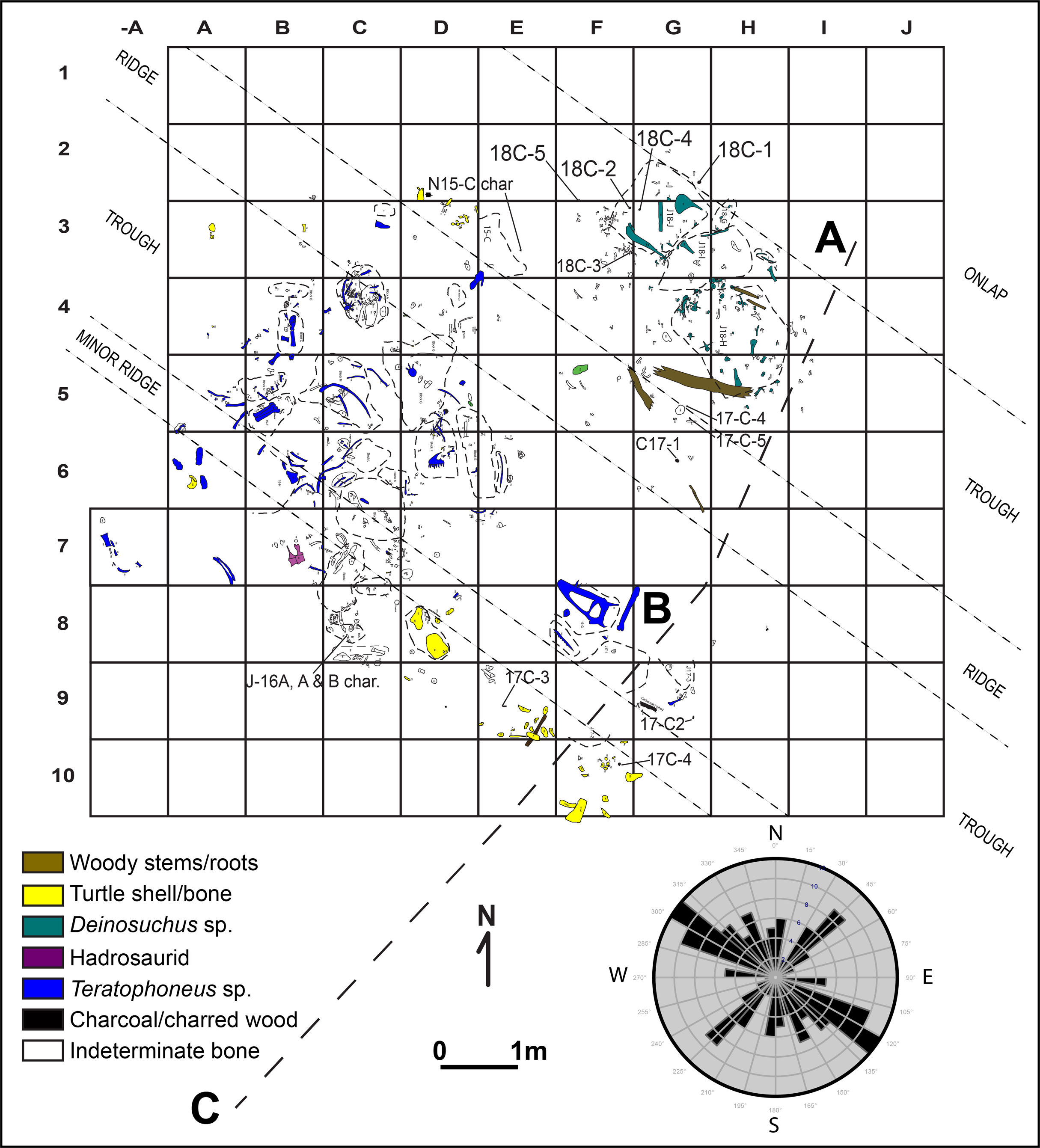
Map of the Rainbows and Unicorns Quarry

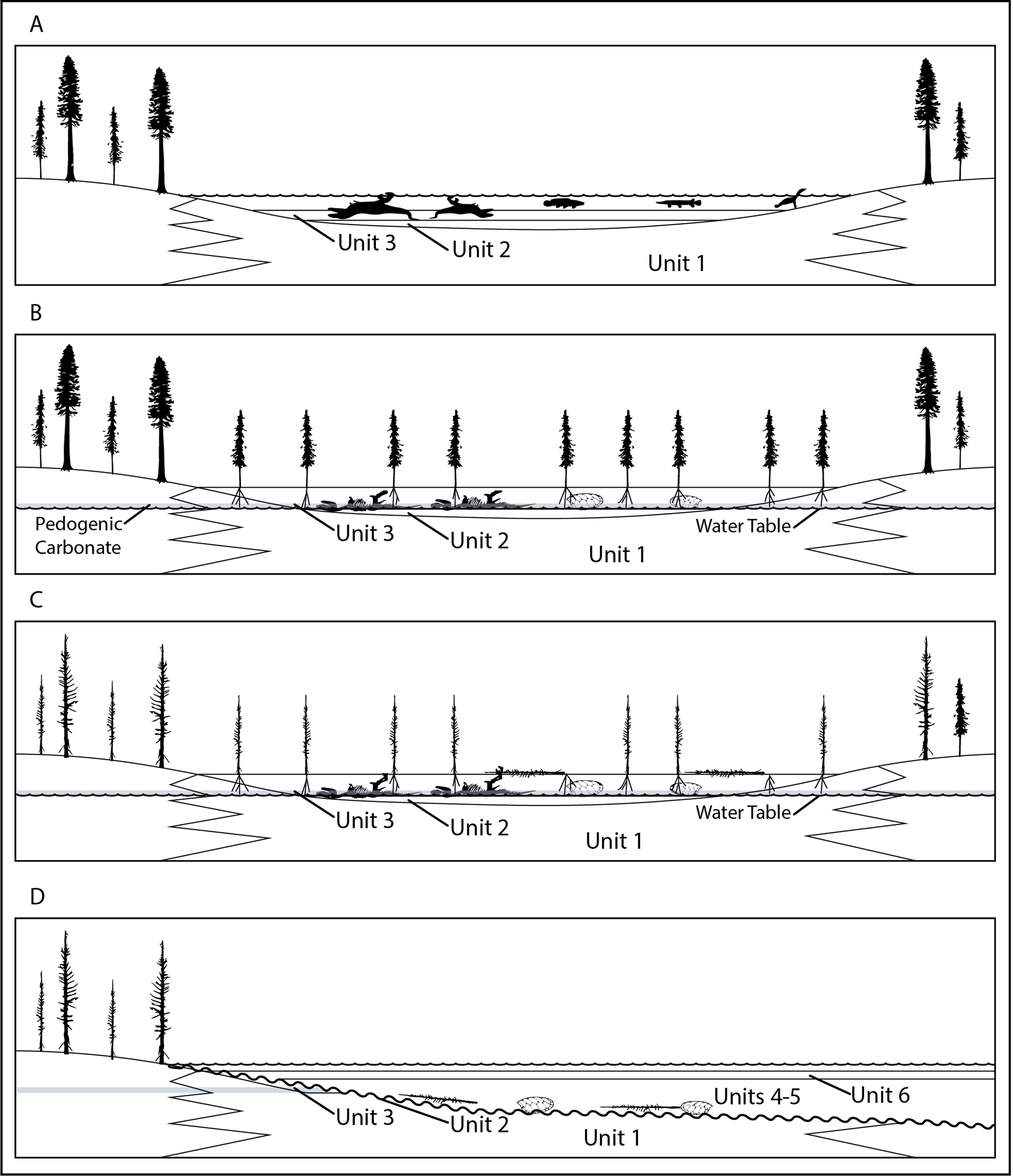
Bonebed development stages at RUQ

A bone bed of fossils from the Rainbows and Unicorns Quarry in Southern Utah's Kaiparowits Formation described in 2021 attributed to Teratophoneus suggests that the genus may have been a social pack-hunter. The fossils, consisting of four or possibly five animals ranging from 4–22 years of age, suggest a mass mortality event, possibly caused by flooding or less likely by cyanobacterial toxicosis, fire, or drought. The fact that all of the animals preserved died within a short time period further strengthens the argument for gregarious behavior in tyrannosaurids, with bone beds of Teratophoneus, Albertosaurus, and Daspletosaurus showcasing the potential behavior may have been widespread amongst tyrannosaurs in general.

== Paleoecology ==
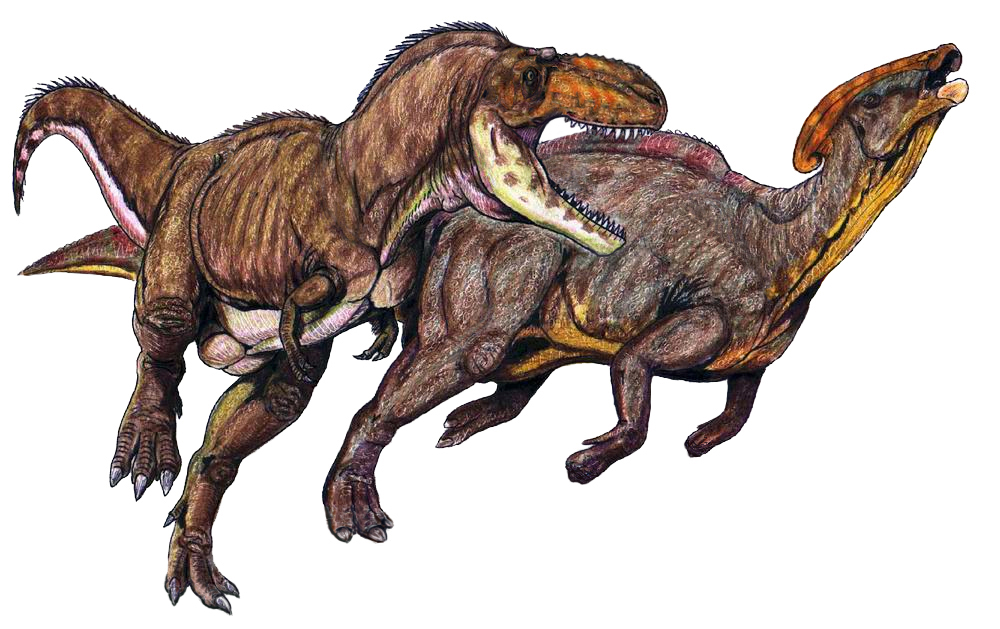
Teratophoneus attacking a Parasaurolophus cyrtocristatus

The holotype of Teratophoneus was recovered at the Kaiparowits Formation in southern Utah. Argon-argon radiometric dating indicates that the fossils were buried during the Campanian age of the Late Cretaceous period. During the Late Cretaceous, the site within the Kaiparowits Formation was located on Laramidia near its eastern shore on the Western Interior Seaway, a large inland sea that split North America into two island landmasses, the other one being Appalachia in the east. The plateau where dinosaurs lived was an ancient floodplain dominated by large channels and an abundance of wetland peat swamps, ponds, and lakes and was bordered by highlands. The climate was wet and humid, supporting an array of different and diverse groups of organisms. This formation contains one of the best and most continuous records of Late Cretaceous terrestrial life in the world.

Teratophoneus curriei shared its paleoenvironment with other theropods, such as dromaeosaurids, the troodontid Talos sampsoni, ornithomimids like Ornithomimus velox, and the caenagnathid Hagryphus giganteus. Non-theropod dinosaurs included the ankylosaur Akainacephalus johnsoni, the hadrosaurs Parasaurolophus cyrtocristatus and Gryposaurus monumentensis, and the ceratopsians Utahceratops gettyi, Nasutoceratops titusi, and Kosmoceratops richardsoni. Other paleofauna present in the Kaiparowits Formation included chondrichthyans (sharks and rays), frogs, salamanders, turtles, lizards, and crocodilians, with Deinosuchus being the apex predator. A variety of early mammals were present, including multituberculates, marsupials, and insectivorans.

== See also ==
- Timeline of tyrannosaur research
