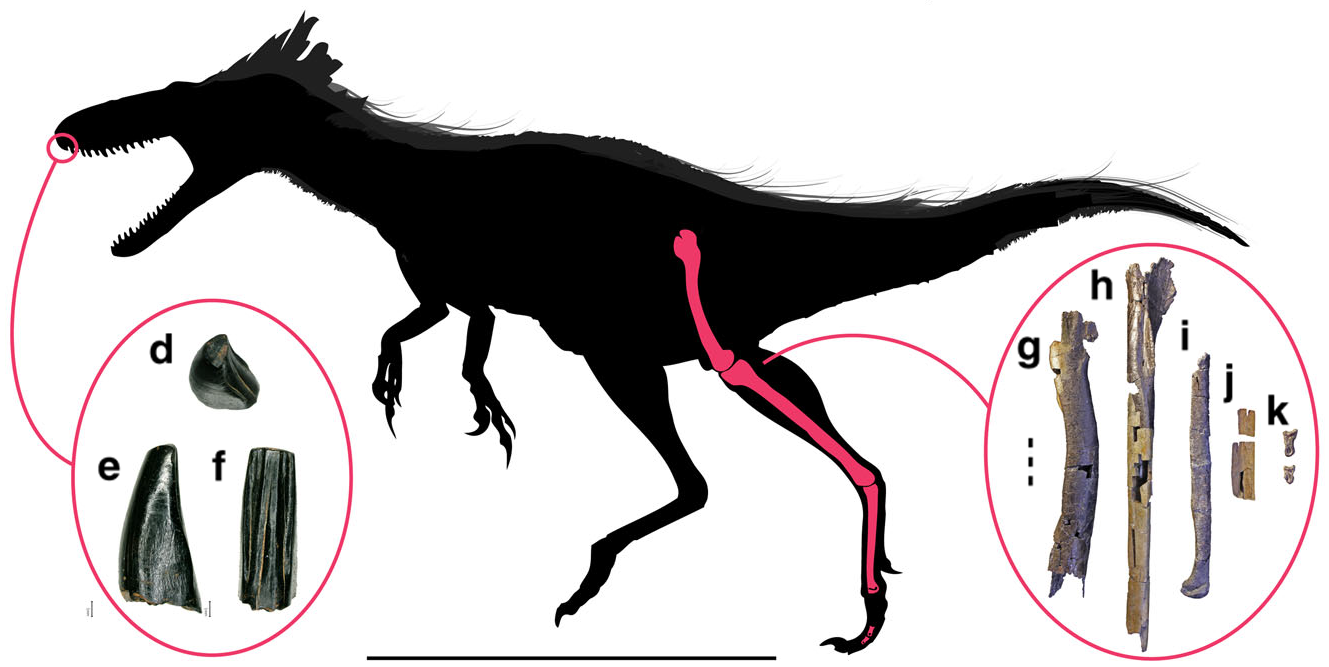
- Diagram showing known remains

Scientific classification
- Kingdom: Animalia
- Phylum: Chordata
- Class: Reptilia
- Clade: Dinosauria
- Clade: Saurischia
- Clade: Theropoda
- Superfamily: †Tyrannosauroidea
- Clade: †Pantyrannosauria
- Genus: †Moros; Zanno et al., 2019
- Species: †M. intrepidus

Binomial name
- †Moros intrepidus Zanno et al., 2019

= Moros intrepidus =

Moros Temporal range: Cenomanian, 96.4 Ma

Species of tyrannosauroid

Moros is a genus of small tyrannosauroid theropod dinosaur that lived during the Late Cretaceous period in what is now Utah. It contains a single species, M. intrepidus. Moros represents one of the earliest known diagnostic tyrannosauroid material from North America.

== Discovery and naming ==
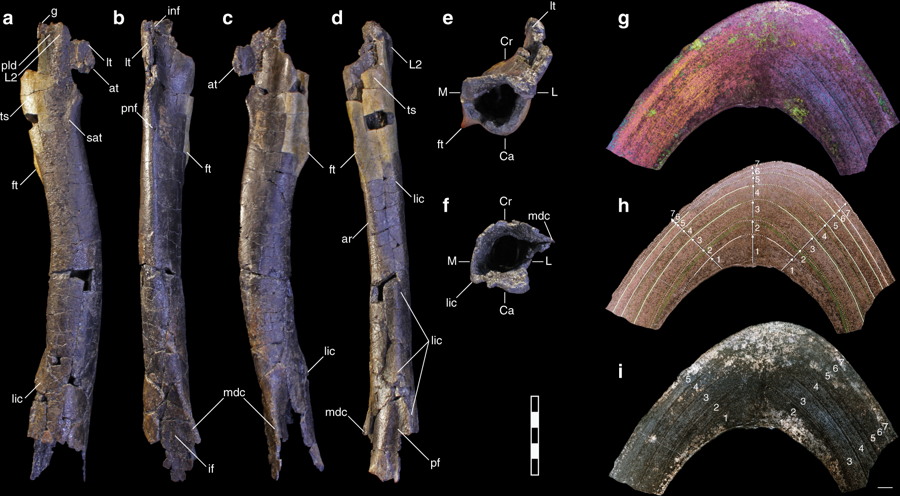
Right femur in various views

Moros was first discovered at the Stormy Theropod site located in Emery County in the U.S. state of Utah. Palaeontologists had been researching the area for ten years when, in 2013, limb bones were seen jutting out of a hillside, prompting the excavation. The bones were described as of a new species in February, 2019. The type species, Moros intrepidus, was named and described by Lindsay E. Zanno, Ryan T. Tucker, Aurore Canoville, Haviv M. Avrahami, Terry A. Gates, and Peter J. Makovicky. The generic name is derived from the Greek term Moros (an embodiment of impending doom), in reference to the establishment of the tyrannosauroid lineage in North America that would soon dominate the continent by the end of the Cretaceous. The specific name is the Latin word intrepidus ("intrepid"), referring to the hypothesized dispersal of tyrannosauroids from Asia throughout North America following the arrival of Moros.

The holotype specimen, NCSM 33392, was found in the lower Mussentuchit Member of the Cedar Mountain Formation dating from the Cenomanian age. The layer has a maximum age of 96.4 million years. The holotype consists of a right leg, specifically the thighbone, shinbone, second and fourth metatarsal, and the third and fourth phalanx of the fourth toe. Lines of arrested growth, or LAGs, indicate that it represents a subadult individual of six or seven years old, nearing its maximum size. Additionally, two premaxillary teeth were referred to the species, specimens NCSM 33393 and NCSM 33276.

== Description ==
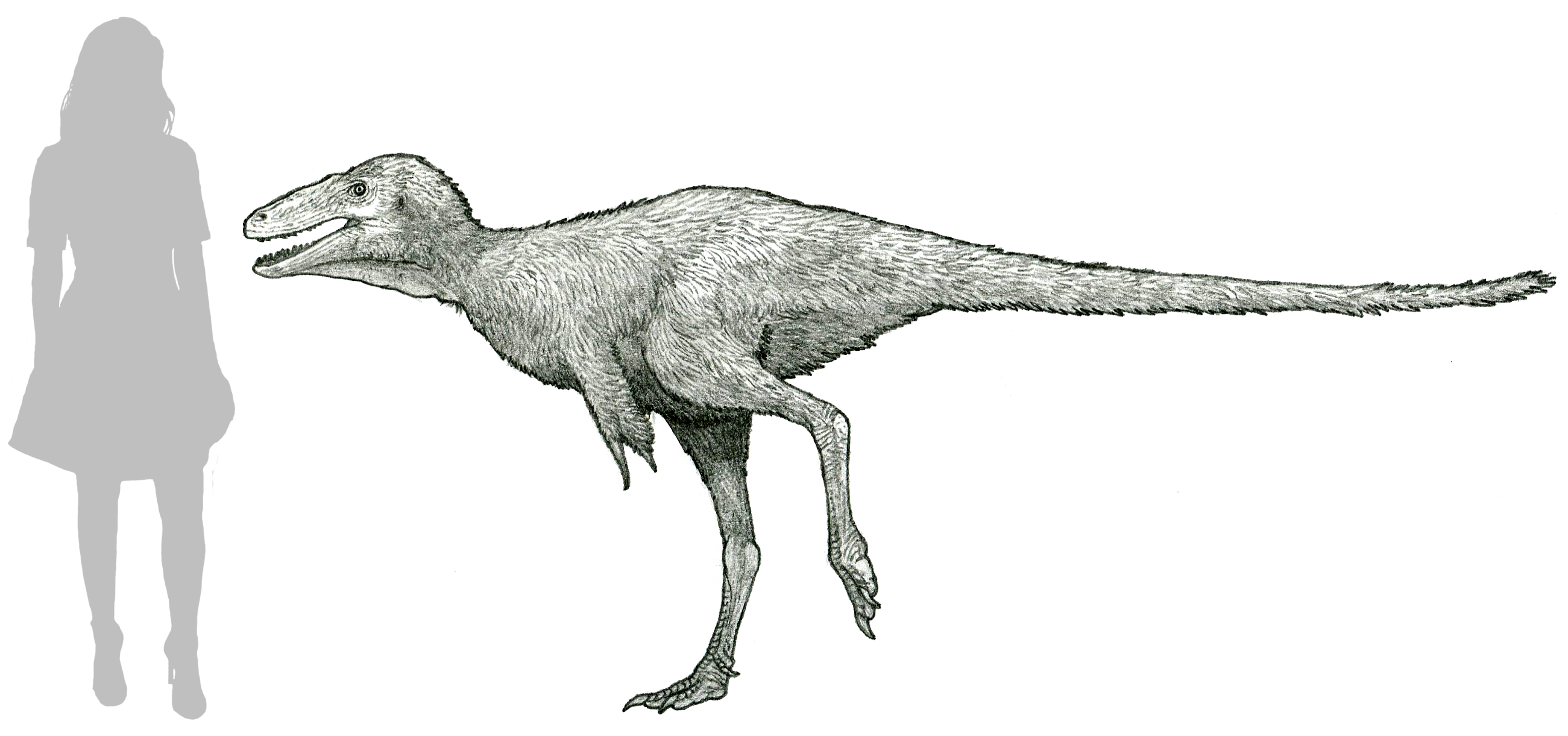
Size compared to the height of an average human

Moros was a small-bodied, cursorial tyrannosauroid with an estimated leg length of 1.2 m (3.9 ft) and a body mass of 78 kg (172 lb). The foot bones of Moros were extremely slender, with metatarsal proportions found to be more similar to ornithomimids than to other Late Cretaceous tyrannosauroids.

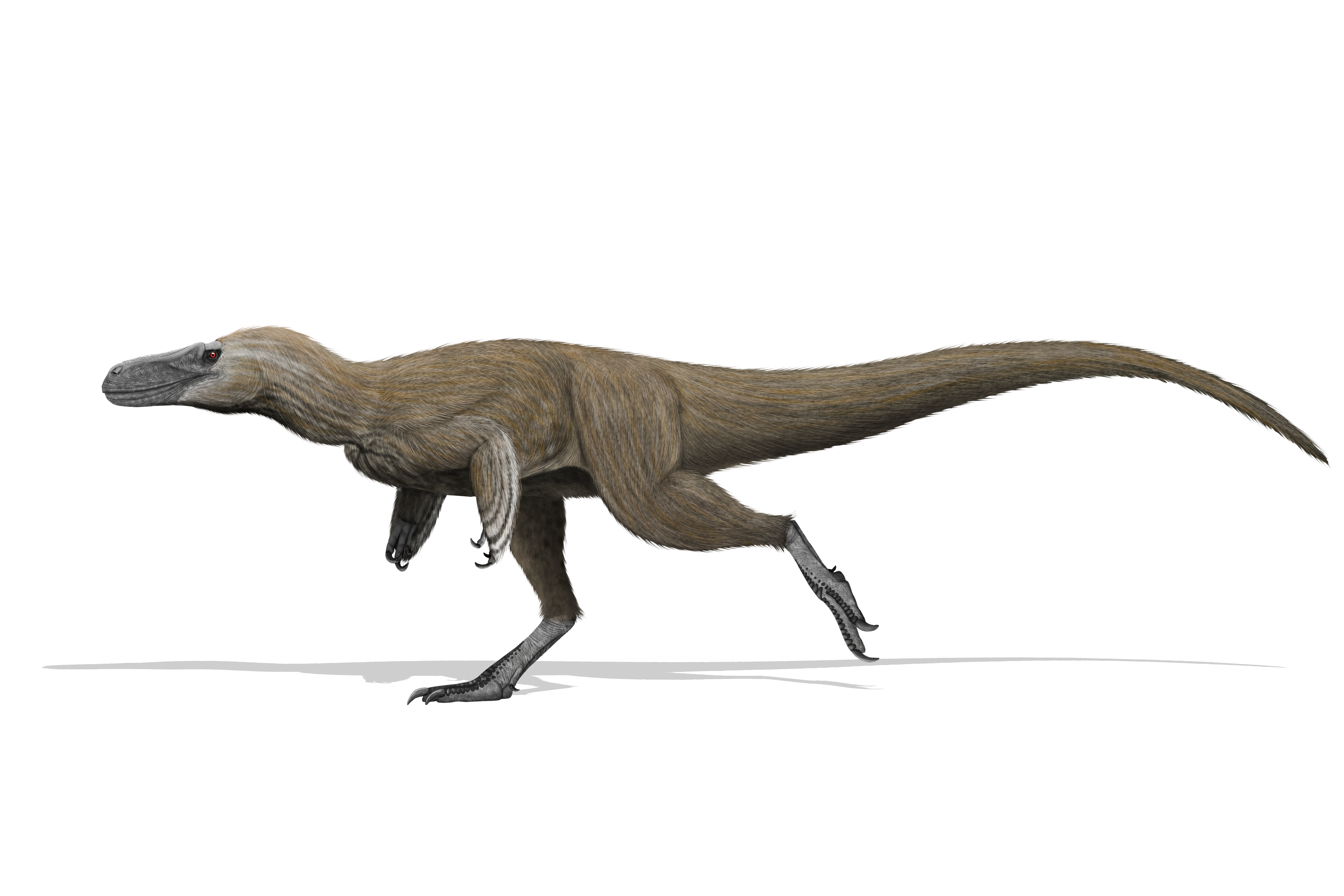
Life reconstruction of M. intrepidus

== Classification ==
In their 2019 phylogenetic analyses, Zanno and colleagues recovered Moros as a basal pantyrannosaurian alongside Asian taxa from the middle of the Cretaceous, such as Xiongguanlong and Timurlengia. This phylogenetic affinity with Asian basal tyrannosauroids suggests that Moros was part of a transcontinental exchange between the biotas of Asia and North America during the mid-Cretaceous that is well-documented in other taxa.

== See also ==
- Timeline of tyrannosaur research
