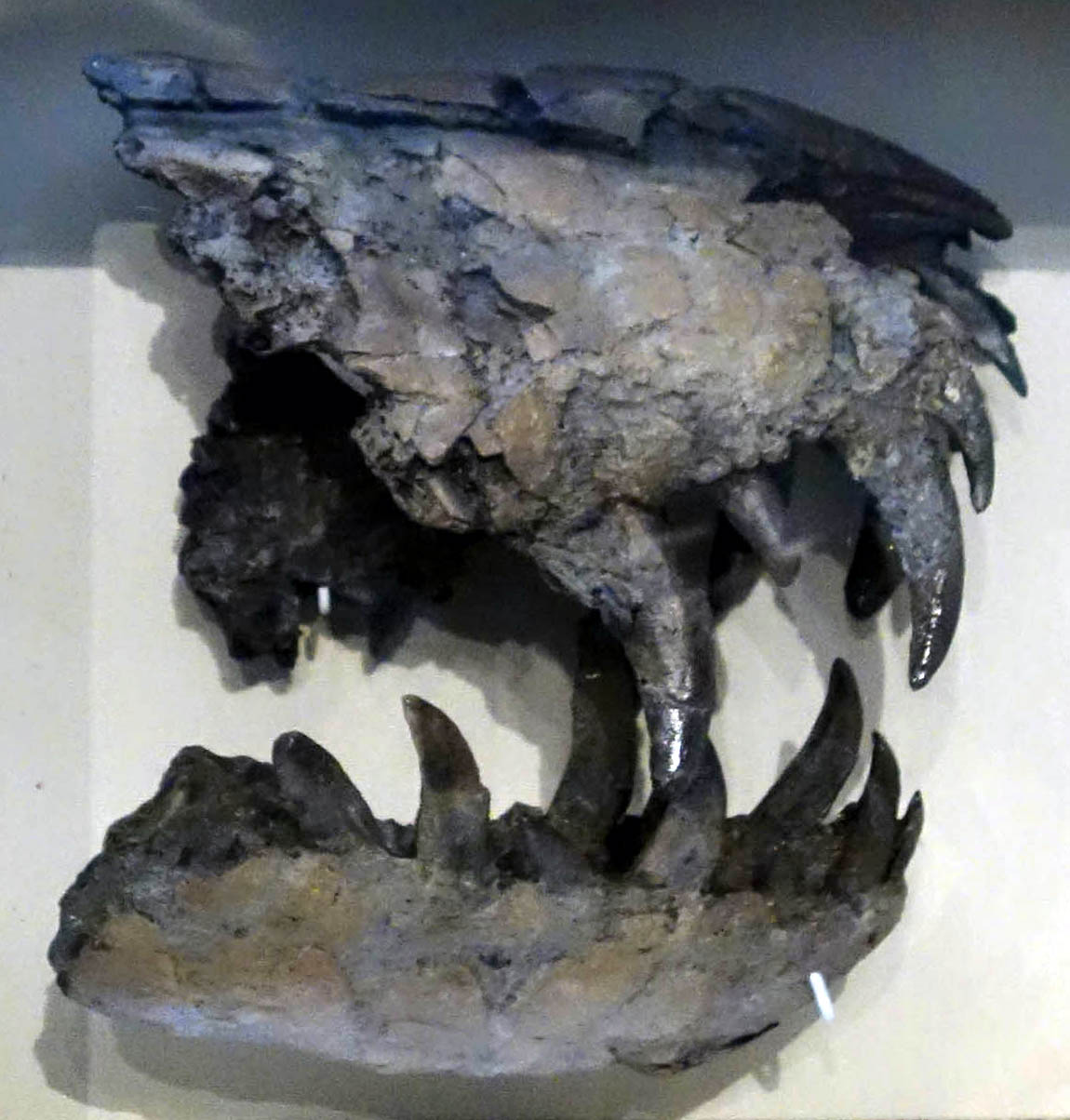
- Cast of the holotype specimen of S. molnari, LACM 28471

Scientific classification
- Kingdom: Animalia
- Phylum: Chordata
- Class: Reptilia
- Clade: Dinosauria
- Clade: Saurischia
- Clade: Theropoda
- Superfamily: †Tyrannosauroidea
- Clade: †Eutyrannosauria
- Genus: †Stygivenator; Olshevsky, Ford & Yamamoto, 1995

Type species
- †Aublysodon molnari Paul, 1988 emend. Paul, 1989

Synonyms
- Aublysodon molnaris Paul, 1988; Aublysodon molnari Paul, 1988 emend Paul, 1989

= Stygivenator =

Stygivenator Temporal range: Late Cretaceous, 66 Ma

Dubious tyrannosaurid genus

Stygivenator (meaning "Styx hunter"), also known as the "Jordan theropod" is a dubious genus of tyrannosauroid dinosaur from the Hell Creek Formation, the type species is Stygivenator molnari. Originally considered a species of Aublysodon, another dubious genus, and then a juvenile of Tyrannosaurus, its specific identity can not presently be determined due to its poor preservation making it impossible to rule out an identity as either a specimen of Tyrannosaurus or Nanotyrannus.

== Discovery and naming ==
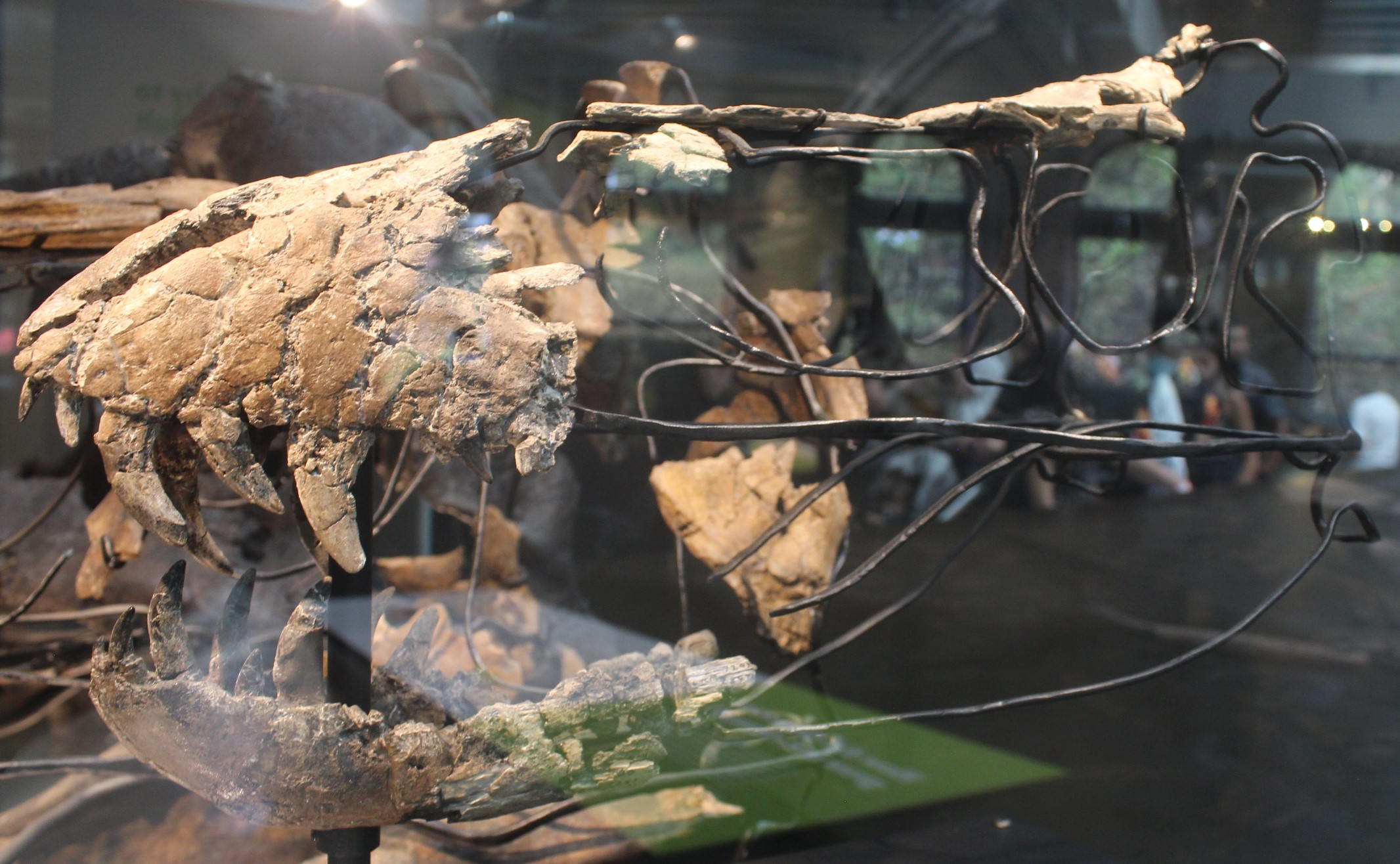
LACM 28471 on display at the Natural History Museum of Los Angeles County

Skull material of a theropod dinosaur was discovered by Harley Garbani in 1966 near Jordan, Montana, Garfield County, Montana, Montana. Found alongside the skull of a Triceratops, it is from late Maastrichtian rock layers of the Hell Creek Formation. The specimen was returned to Garbani's institution, the Natural History Museum of Los Angeles County in California and given the specimen number LACM 28471. It's a portion of the snout consisting of both maxillae, teeth, nasals, frontals, a parietal, and portions of the surangular and dentaries. Though originally considered to include one tooth from the unpreserved premaxilla, later studies have reinterpretted this element as a maxillary tooth.

In 1978 it was scientifically described by Ralph E. Molnar, who noted similarities to both tyrannosaurids and dromaeosaurids but considered it most likely to represent a large dromaeosaur. Considering the material too lacking to give it a name, he simply referred to it as the "Jordan theropod". Gregory S. Paul, in the 1988 book Predatory Dinosaurs of the World, instead identified it as a tyrannosaurid belonging to the genus Aublysodon due to the anatomy of its supposed premaxillary tooth. He considered it a new species, and named it Aublysodon molnaris after Molnar. This was later corrected by Paul to the correctly formed Aublysodon molnari. Independently, Molnar returned to the specimen alongside Kenneth Carpenter in a 1989 study, concluding that it was similar to Aublysodon based on the "premaxillary" tooth. However, they assignined it to the type species of that genus, Aublysodon mirandus, rather than a distinct species.

In modern research, Aublysodon is considered to be a dubious genus, as the features of its teeth are common amongst tyrannosaurs. Due to the doubtful nature of Aublysodon, George Olshevsky, Tracy Ford and Seiji Yamamoto gave it a distinct genus Stygivenator in a 1995 publication. This name was derived from the Underworld river Styx of Greek mythology, referring to the Hell Creek Formation, as well as -venator, the Latin word for hunter. Together, it formed the intended meaning "Hell Creek hunter". The name came from Molnar, who would have used it in his original 1978 were he more certain of its identity at the time. Olshevsky also assigned two older species of Aublysodon from the Lance Formation, A. amplus and A. cristatus, to Stygivenator, creating the new combinations S. amplus and S. cristatus. Later authors have considered traditional "aublysodonts" to simply represented dubious juvenile tyrannosaurs.

== Taxonomic identity ==
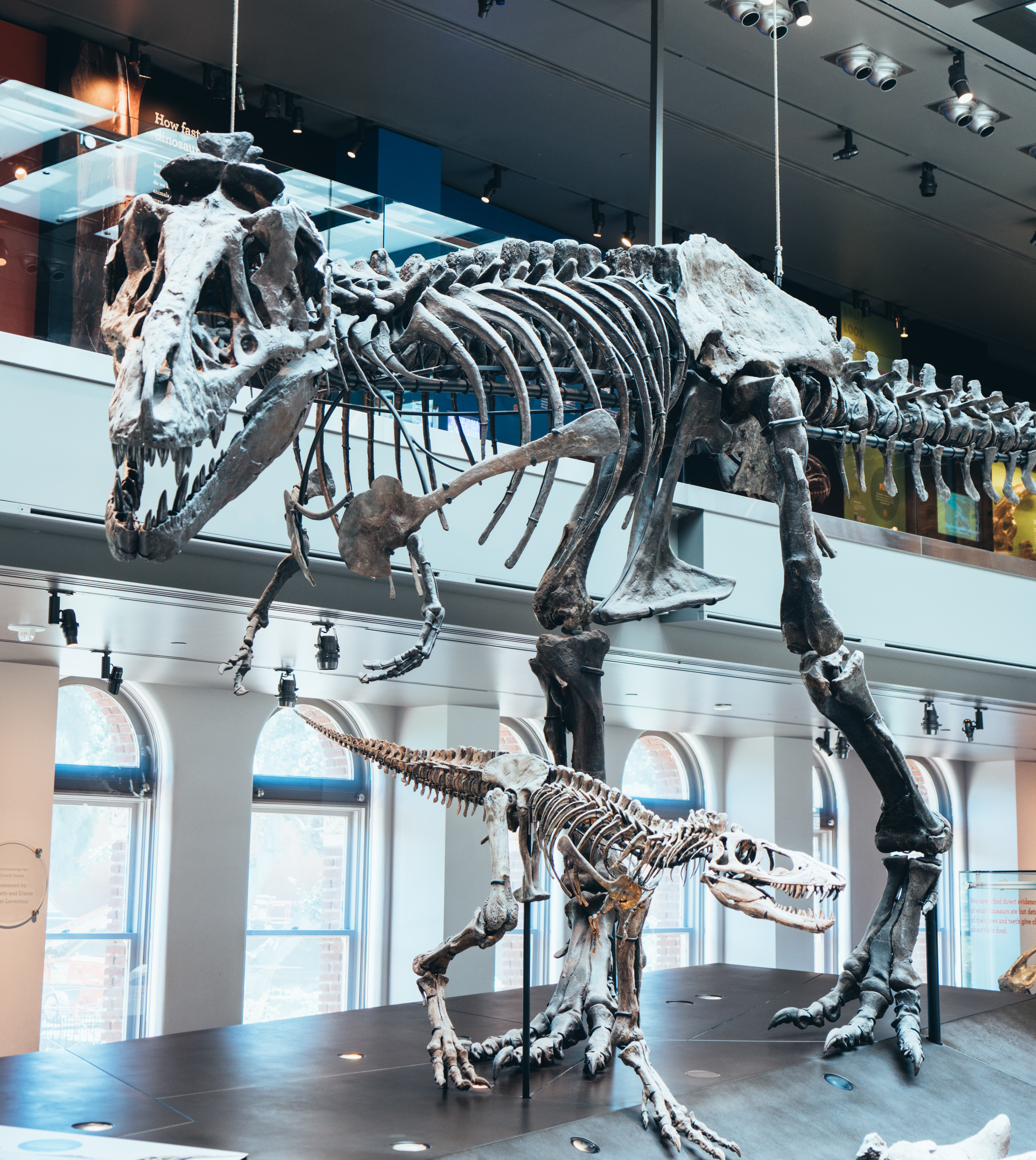
Speculative skeleton mount of "Stygivenator" (bottom) and Tyrannosaurus (top); many authors have considered them different ages of the same species

Early studies of the Jordan theropod considered it to belong to a unique species within the Hell Creek Formation; either as a large dromaeosaur, a specimen of Aublysodon mirandus, a distinct species A. molnari, or the distinct genus Stygivenator. Later studies, however, would call its distinctiveness into question. In a 2000 study, Thomas Carr and Thomas Williamston considered its traits insufficient to distinguish a tyrannosaur species, and classified it as an indeterminate juvenile tyrannosaurid. The studies published in 2003 by Chistopher Brochu and Philip J. Currie suspected the specimen to belong to a juvenile T. rex, generally followed by later researchers. An important part of this reclassification was the reidentification of the supposedly distinctive premaxillary tooth as a maxillary tooth.

A complication in the classification of the Jordan theropod was the status of another small Hell Creek tyrannosaur, Nanotyrannus lancensis. Originally named 1946, researchers variously considered it to be based upon members of a distinct species or upon immature T. rex. Peter Larson would argue in 2013 that "Stygivenator" may in fact be a young Nanotyrannus rather than a T. rex. Contrastingly, a 2016 study by Joshua Schmerge and Bruce Rothschild supported the validity of Nanotyrannus but still considered "Stygivenator" to be a young T. rex. Other researchers such as Carr continued to support a single species model, with "Stygivenator" and Nanotyrannus being specimens of T. rex, through the 2010s and into the 2020s.

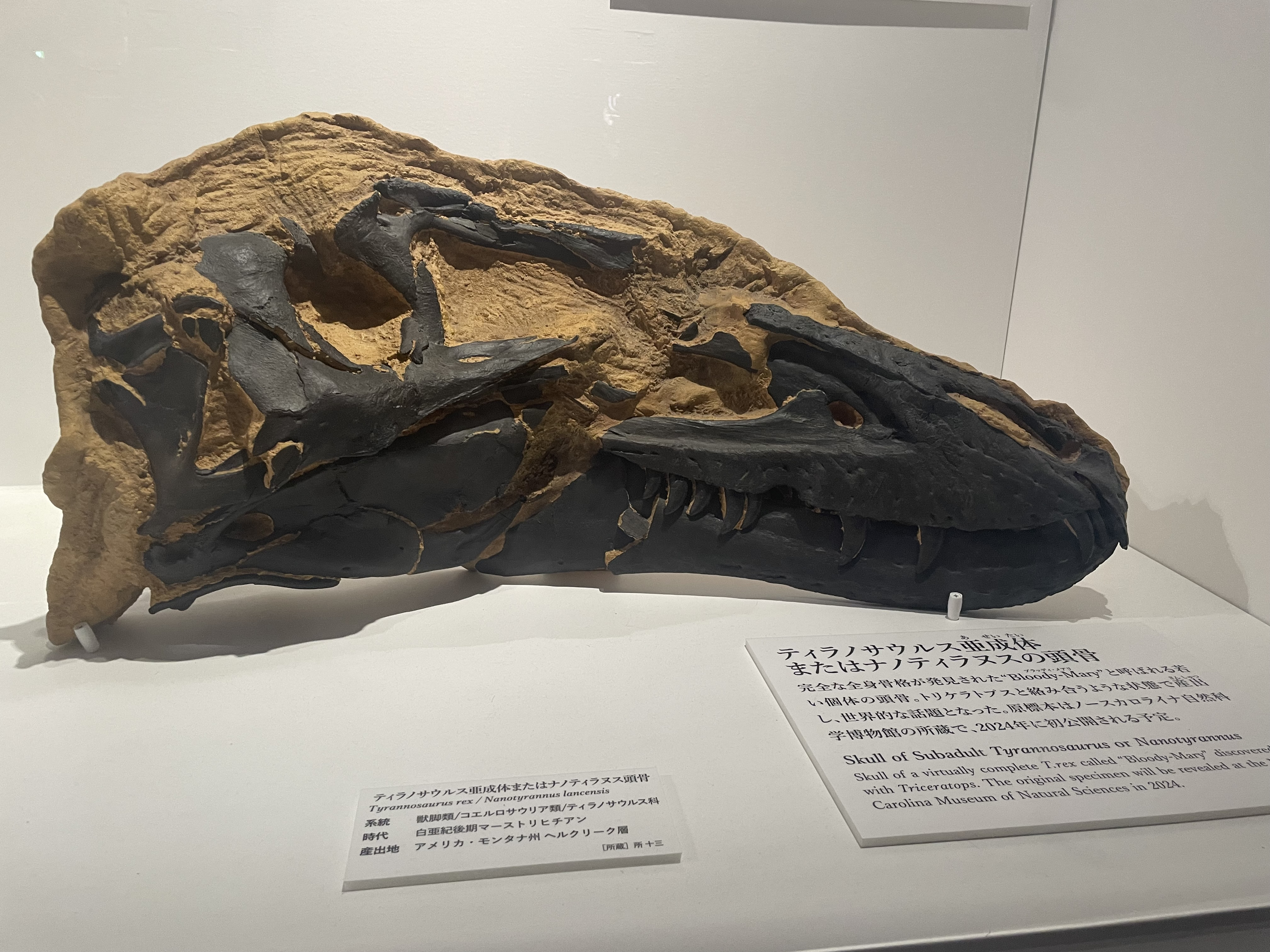
Skull cast of Nanotyrannus specimen "Bloody Mary", whose potential similarities to "Stygivenator" have been the subject of debate

The idea of a distinct Stygivenator was revived by Nicholas R. Longrich and Evan T. Saitta in 2024, who considered the specimen to differ from Nanotyrannus in multiple ways. This included the narrow end of the antorbital fossa, the shape of the maxilla, and the hooked tip of the lower jaw. Based on informal observations of "Bloody Mary", they considered it a possible second specimen of the species. Greg Paul returned to the species in 2025, similarly considering it distinct from both Tyrannosaurus and Nanotyrannus and based upon the antorbital fossa and jaw tip. He also provisionally assigned "Bloody Mary" to the genus, along with a tyrannosaur specimen nicknamed "Jodi", though suspected they may be a second species or even an additional separate genus. Despite this, he considered the taxonomy of Stygivenator uncertain due to insufficient data on its anatomy.

"Bloody Mary" was described in 2025 by Lindsay E. Zanno and James G. Napoli as a new specimen of Nanotyrannus, rejecting prior single species models of Hell Creek tyrannosaur taxonomy. One of many specimens studied firsthand by Zanno and Napoli was the holotype of Stygivenator, which they considered impossible to definitively identify as either Tyrannosaurus or Nanotyrannus and therefore dubious. Agreeing with Carr about the "premaxillary" tooth, they also rejected the "hooked" dentary as either resulting from an injury or a preservational artefact. They also noted that comparison with the specimen "Jane" might have hindered Longrich and Saitta's identification, as they considered it a specimen of N. lancensis but Zanno and Napoli found it to represent a separate species Nanotyrannus lethaeus. It was noted that "Stygivenator" may have a small or absent subnarial foramen, which would identify as a Nanotyrannus specimen, but poor preservation hinders confident assessment of this trait. Of the two species, the narrow antorbital fossa would identify it as a likely N. lancensis, similar to "Bloody Mary", rather than an N. lethaeus.
