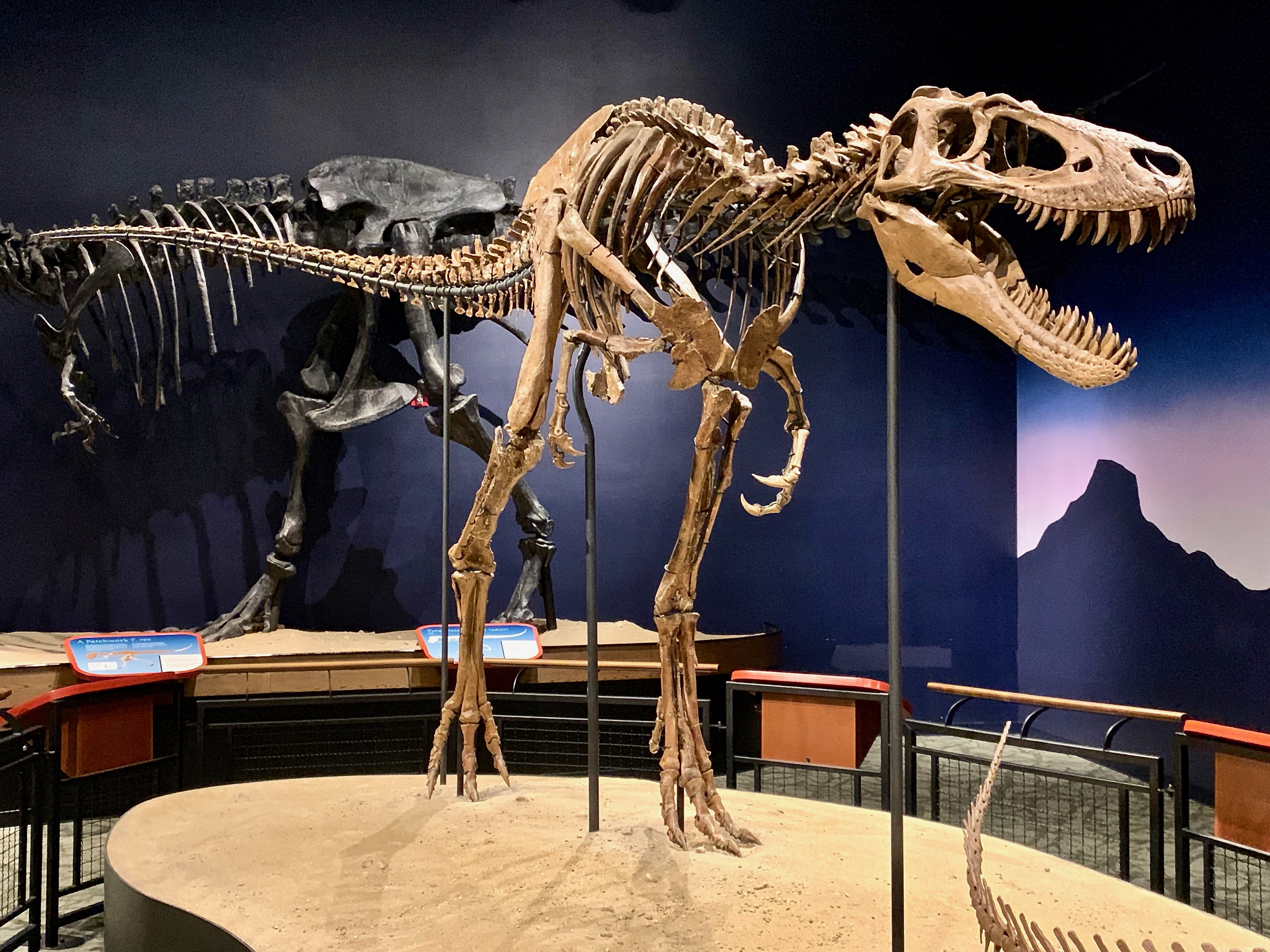
- Mounted skeleton of the N. lethaeus holotype (BMRP 2002.4.1, nicknamed "Jane") at the Burpee Museum

Scientific classification
- Kingdom: Animalia
- Phylum: Chordata
- Class: Reptilia
- Clade: Dinosauria
- Clade: Saurischia
- Clade: Theropoda
- Superfamily: †Tyrannosauroidea
- Clade: †Eutyrannosauria
- Clade: †Nanotyrannidae; Zanno & Napoli, 2025
- Genus: †Nanotyrannus; Bakker, Williams & Currie, 1988

Type species
- †Gorgosaurus lancensis Gilmore, 1946

Species
- †N. lancensis (Gilmore, 1946); †N. lethaeus Zanno & Napoli, 2025

Synonyms
- Genus synonymy: "Clevelanotyrannus" Bakker et al. vide Currie, 1987b; "Nanotyrannes" Carpenter vide Anonymous, 1988; "Nanotyrannus" Bakker et al. vide Paul, 1988; Stygivenator? Olshevsky, Ford & Yamamoto, 1995; Species synonymy: Gorgosaurus lancensis Gilmore, 1946; Deinodon lancensis (Gilmore, 1946) Kuhn, 1965; Aublysodon lancensis (Gilmore, 1946) Charig in Appleby et al., 1967; Albertosaurus lancensis (Gilmore, 1946) Russell, 1970; Tyrannosaurus lancensis (Gilmore, 1946); Aublysodon molnaris? Paul, 1988; Aublysodon molnari? Paul, 1988 emend. Paul, 1989; Stygivenator molnari? (Paul, 1988 emend. Paul, 1989) Olshevsky, Ford & Yamamoto, 1995

= Nanotyrannus =

Nanotyrannus Temporal range: Late Maastrichtian 67–66 Ma

Genus of theropod dinosaurs

Nanotyrannus (/ˈnænoʊˌtaɪˌrænəs, -tɪ- /, NAN-o-ti-RAN-us) is a genus of tyrannosauroid dinosaur that lived in what is now western North America during the Maastrichtian age of the Late Cretaceous, 67 to 66 million years ago. Its fossils are mainly known from the Hell Creek Formation. It was one of the last-known non-avian dinosaurs and lived until the Cretaceous–Paleogene extinction event. The first named species, N. lancensis, was described as a new species of Gorgosaurus in 1946 by Charles W. Gilmore based on a single skull. Re-examination of the specimen in 1988 by Robert T. Bakker, Michael Williams and Philip J. Currie moved the species to a new genus of tyrannosaurid, named Nanotyrannus in reference to its small body size compared to other tyrannosaurids.

Subsequent research indicated that the skull belonged to an immature animal, leading many researchers to favor its identification as a juvenile Tyrannosaurus rex. Its taxonomic status has since been a subject of intense scientific debate. In 2025, Lindsay Zanno and James Napoli published an exhaustive revision of Nanotyrannus. Therein, they described a complete tyrannosauroid skeleton from the Hell Creek Formation, also known by its nicknames "Bloody Mary" and "Manteo" (part of the Dueling Dinosaurs specimen), which they demonstrated to be a mature N. lancensis individual. These researchers named a second species, N. lethaeus, based on the "Jane" specimen. An independent study by Christopher T. Griffin and colleagues published later that year argued that the holotype skull of N. lancensis belonged to a mature individual based on histology (microscopic study of the living organism's tissue) of the hyoid bone, but D. Cary Woodruff and colleagues questioned their methodology for hyoid bone histology in 2026.

Nanotyrannus was a mid-sized tyrannosauroid, measuring around 17 ft (5.2 m) in length. The adult N. lancensis may have weighed nearly 704 kg (1,552 lb) based on the "Bloody Mary" specimen. N. lethaeus was larger, and mature individuals may have reached a body mass of about 1,200 kg (2,600 lb). The morphology of Nanotyrannus combines characteristics from more basal tyrannosauroids, such as Moros and Xiongguanlong, with more derived tyrannosaurids. Unlike Tyrannosaurus, Nanotyrannus had a slender, low skull, and small crests or horns immediately in front of its eyes. The muscle attachment sites at the back of its skull were large, suggesting that it could strongly flex its head from side to side. The teeth at the front of its upper jaw were not serrated, unlike many other tyrannosaurs. The rest of the teeth were serrated and compressed from side to side, a condition known as ziphodonty, which is not seen in tyrannosaurids. Nanotyrannus was longer-legged than contemporary taxa, suggesting that it was a pursuit predator, and had forelimbs which were both absolutely and proportionally larger than its relatives.

Nanotyrannus is the only definite representative of the family Nanotyrannidae, though one phylogenetic hypothesis suggests close relations to Appalachiosaurus and Dryptosaurus within this clade, and that Nanotyrannus descended from a lineage of Appalachian tyrannosaurs which migrated to the other North American island continent, Laramidia, with the recession of the Western Interior Seaway.

== History and validity ==
=== Initial discovery ===
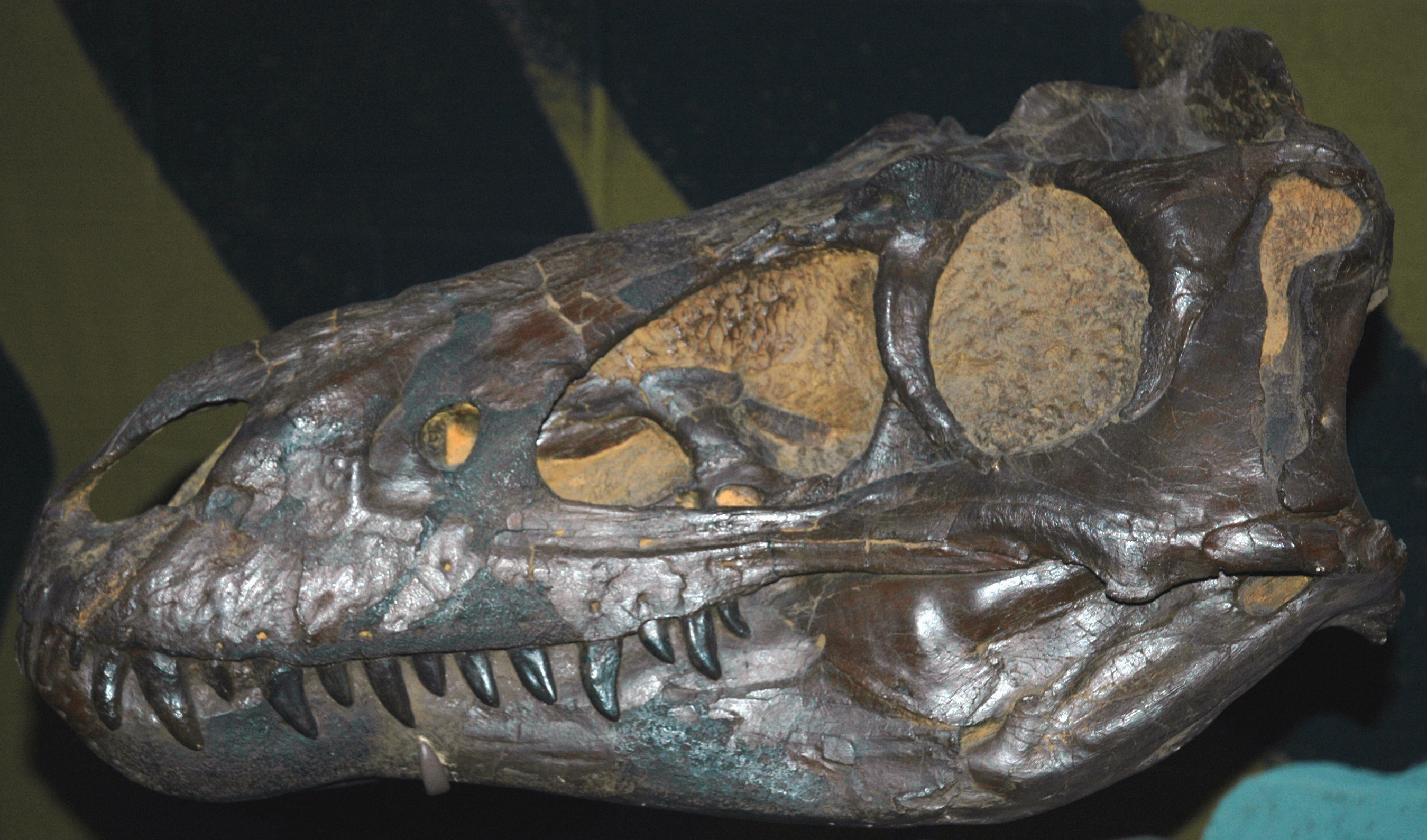
Holotype skull of N. lancensis (CMNH 7541)

Nanotyrannus is based on CMNH 7541, a skull collected in 1942 by David Hosbrook Dunkle. It was described in 1946 by Charles W. Gilmore, who classified it as a new species in the tyrannosaurid genus Gorgosaurus, G. lancensis. The specific name, lancensis, references the Lance Formation, since Gilmore initially considered the Hell Creek Formation—where the holotype was found—to be a member of the Lance Formation, hence noted as "Hell Creek member", but the type locality has since been corrected as the Hell Creek Formation.

In 1988, the specimen was re-described by Robert T. Bakker, Michael Williams, then the curator of paleontology at the Cleveland Museum of Natural History, and Phil Currie, where the original specimen was housed and is now on display. They named the new genus Nanotyrannus for the specimen, stating that the name derives from the Latin words nano, meaning 'small', and tyrannus, meaning 'tyrant'. The etymology has subsequently been clarified to be derived from the Greek words νάνος (nanos), meaning 'dwarf' or 'pygmy', and τύραννος (tyrannos), meaning 'king'. The initial research by Bakker and colleagues indicated that the skull bones were fused, therefore implying it represents an adult specimen. The possibility that the holotype represents a juvenile Tyrannosaurus rex was first suggested by Anatoly Konstantinovich Rozhdestvensky in 1965. Subsequent analysis of the specimen by Thomas Carr in 1999 indicated that it was immature, leading Carr and many other paleontologists to consider it a juvenile specimen of T. rex.

=== Later finds ===
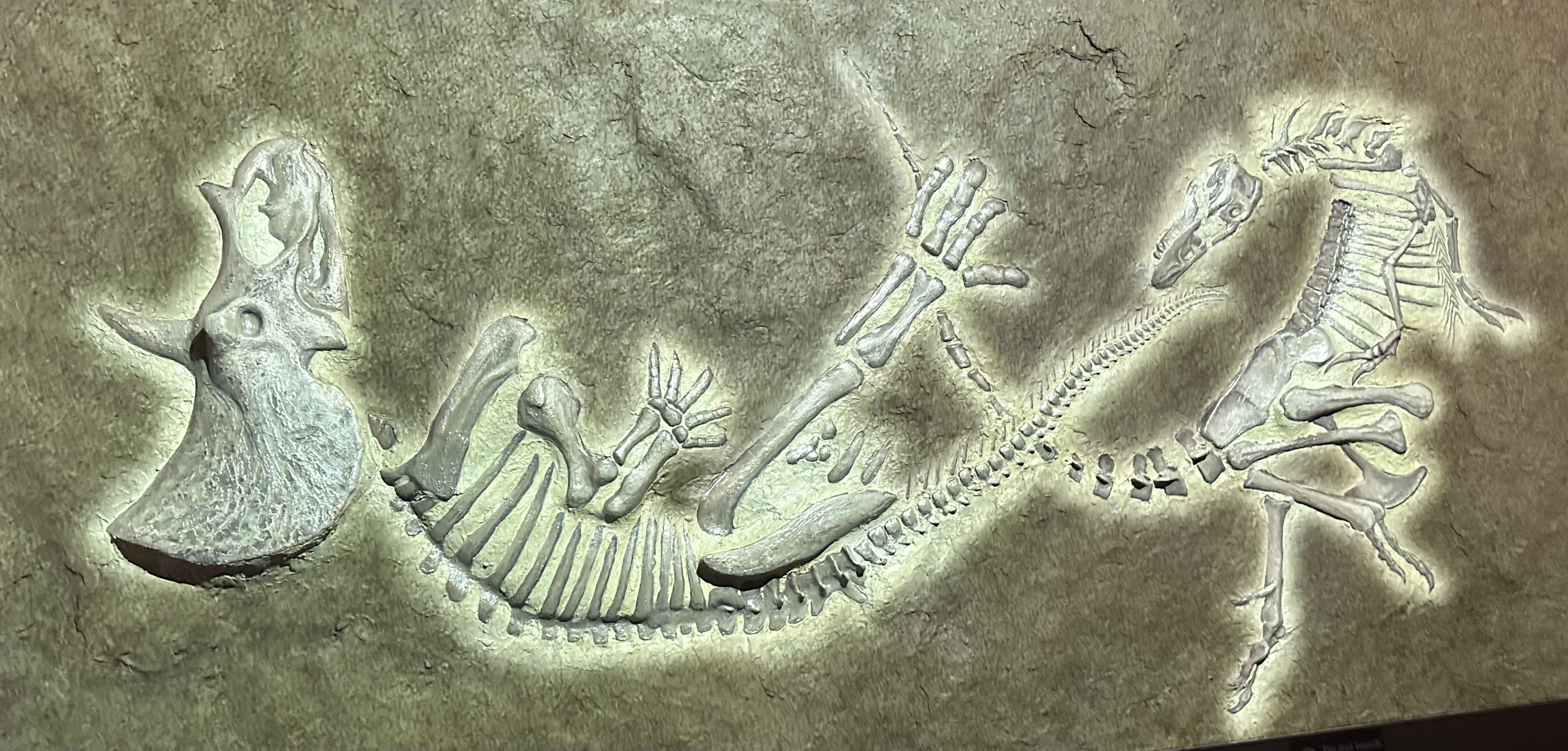
Idealized miniature reconstruction of the Dueling Dinosaurs specimen at the North Carolina Museum of Natural Sciences. The actual specimens had to be taken apart to be transported, and are thus no longer in the same pose as they were found.

In 2001, a more complete juvenile tyrannosaur (nicknamed "Jane", accession number BMRP 2002.4.1), suggested to belong to the same species as the original Nanotyrannus specimen, was uncovered. This discovery prompted a conference on tyrannosaurs focused on the issues of the validity of Nanotyrannus, held at the Burpee Museum of Natural History in 2005. Several paleontologists who had previously published opinions that N. lancensis was a valid species, including Currie and Williams, saw the discovery of "Jane" as a confirmation that Nanotyrannus was, in fact, a juvenile T. rex. Peter Larson continued to support the hypothesis that Nanotyrannus lancensis was a separate but closely related species, and also argued that Stygivenator (LACM 28471), which is generally considered to be a juvenile of Tyrannosaurus rex, could be a younger specimen of Nanotyrannus.

In late 2011, news reports about a 2006 discovery of a new, virtually complete tyrannosaur specimen found alongside a ceratopsid were made. The specimens were studied by Robert Bakker and Peter Larson on-site, who identified the tyrannosaur as Nanotyrannus and the ceratopsian as a taxon possibly distinct from Triceratops. It was impossible to determine whether the tyrannosaur specimen, then nicknamed "Bloody Mary", was distinct from T. rex, as the specimen remained in private hands until 2020, when the ownership of the specimen was decided by the Montana Supreme Court to be given to the land-owners Mary Anne and Lige Murray, who agreed to sell the paired fossils to a U.S.-based museum. The fossil was acquired by the North Carolina Museum of Natural Sciences in 2020, after which the museum built an additional research lab space in which to prepare, study, and display the specimens. In 2025, paleontologists Lindsay Zanno and James Napoli published an initial description of the "Bloody Mary" specimen as part of an extensive revision of the genus Nanotyrannus. They identified this specimen as a skeletally mature individual of Nanotyrannus and provided several lines of evidence supporting the validity of this genus. They also described a second species, N. lethaeus, based on the Jane specimen due to notable differences between it and N. lancensis. The North Carolina Museum of Natural Sciences accessioned and nicknamed the Nanotyrannus and Triceratops specimens respectively as NCSM 40000 ("Manteo") and NCSM 40001 ("Murphy"), and Roberts et al. (2026) identified their locality of origin as the lower portion of the Hell Creek Formation, dated to approximately 66.897 million years ago.

The specific name for the second species, lethaeus, comes from the Latin, and is the adjective of Lethe, referring to the river Lethe from Greco-Roman mythology, which flows through the underworld (often equated to hell). The name references both the Hell Creek Formation, where the specimen was found, and the mythological function of drinking from the Lethe: to forget a prior life and be reincarnated.

=== Validity ===
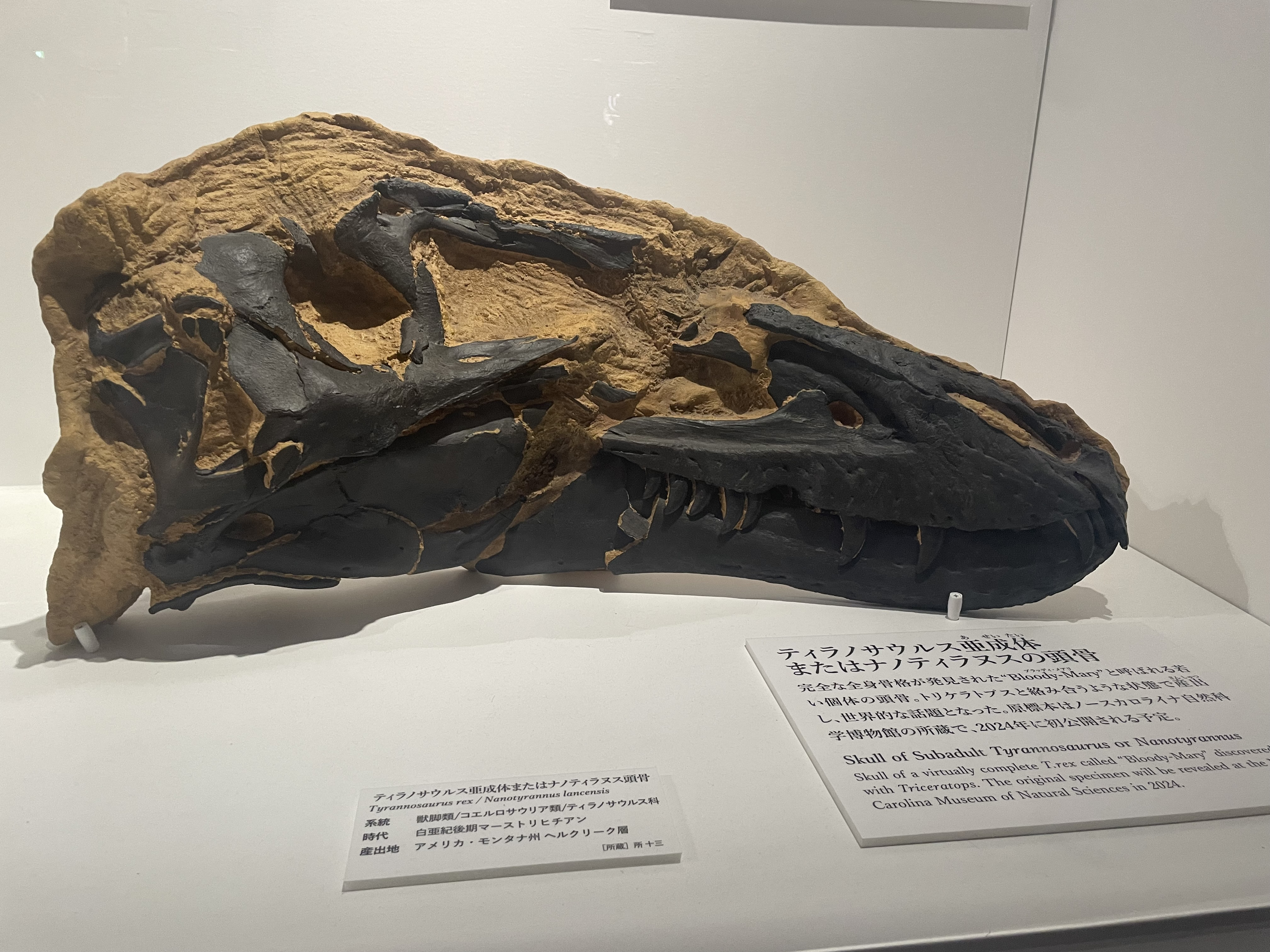
Skull cast of the "Bloody Mary" specimen of N. lancensis

The primary difference that some scientists have used to argue for the validity of Nanotyrannus lancensis concerns the number of teeth. Specimens referred to N. lancensis have 15-16 teeth on each side of the maxilla (upper jaw) and 16-18 teeth on each side of the dentary (lower jaw), whereas adult T. rex specimens had 11–12 tooth positions in the upper jaw and 12–14 in the lower. The exact implications of this difference in tooth count have not been universally accepted, however. In his 1999 study of tyrannosaurid growth patterns, Carr showed that, in Gorgosaurus libratus, the number of teeth decreased as the animal grew, and he used this data to support the hypothesis that N. lancensis is simply a juvenile T. rex. Takanobu Tsujihi and colleagues, who studied growth in the related Tarbosaurus bataar, found little to no decrease in tooth count during growth, even though they had juvenile specimens much younger than the Nanotyrannus specimens. These researchers also noted, however, that both Tyrannosaurus and Gorgosaurus show significant differences in tooth count between individuals of the same age group, and that tooth count may vary on an individual basis unrelated to growth.

Larson has also contended that, along with skull features, Nanotyrannus can also be distinguished from Tyrannosaurus by proportionally larger hands with phalanges on the third metacarpal and in the furcula morphology. Another difference cited in support of the validity of N. lancensis is the presence of a small foramen on the quadratojugal. The holotypes of both Nanotyrannus species have this feature, which is also seen in the adult specimen of Daspletosaurus horneri and an isolated quadratojugal from Alberta, indicating that this feature is seen in other distantly-related tyrannosaurs.

A limb proportion analysis published in 2016 suggested that Nanotyrannus specimens have differing levels of cursoriality, cited as a potential difference between N. lancensis and T. rex. However, paleontologist Manabu Sakomoto commented that this conclusion may be impacted by low sample size, and the discrepancy does not necessarily reflect taxonomic distinction. A 2020 study by Holly N. Woodward and colleagues indicated that the specimens referred to Nanotyrannus are ontogenetically immature and found it probable that these specimens belonged to Tyrannosaurus rex. Yun (2015) claimed that all of the differences used to distinguish Nanotyrannus were individually or ontogenetically variable features, or the products of taphonomic distortion of the bones.

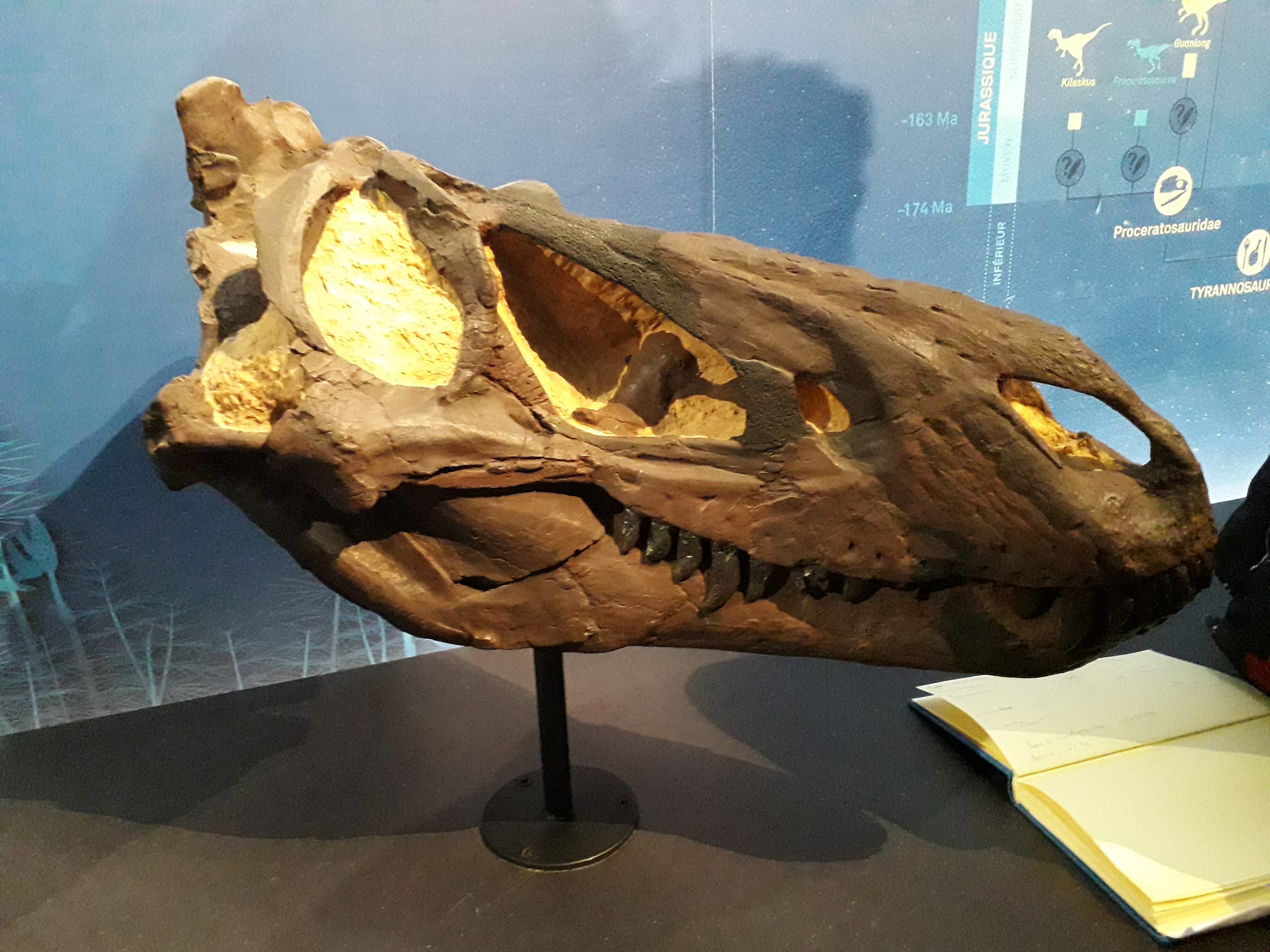
Right side of a N. lancensis holotype skull cast

In 2024, Nicholas Longrich and Evan T. Saitta re-examined the holotype and referred specimens of Nanotyrannus. Based on several factors, including differences in morphology, ontogeny, and phylogeny, Longrich and Saitta suggested that Nanotyrannus is a distinct taxon that may fall outside of Tyrannosauridae, based on some of their phylogenetic analyses. Voris et al. (June 2025) suggested that the scoring of Nanotyrannus in a more basal position by Longrich & Saitta (2024) may have been caused by "scoring characteristics related to immaturity" and problematic data sets, supporting the previous interpretation that Nanotyrannus represents a juvenile T. rex. Later in June 2025, Gregory S. Paul also supported a basal eutyrannosaurian (non-tyrannosaurid) position for Nanotyrannus, emphasizing the validity and distinction of this genus as part of his preferred "multiple small taxa hypothesis" (MSTH) for theropod diversity in the Hell Creek Formation. Based on the MSTH, Paul also argued for the validity of Stygivenator, a Hell Creek theropod known from a fragmentary skull, and claimed that N. lancensis has been treated as a wastebasket taxon that likely comprises fossils of multiple taxa.

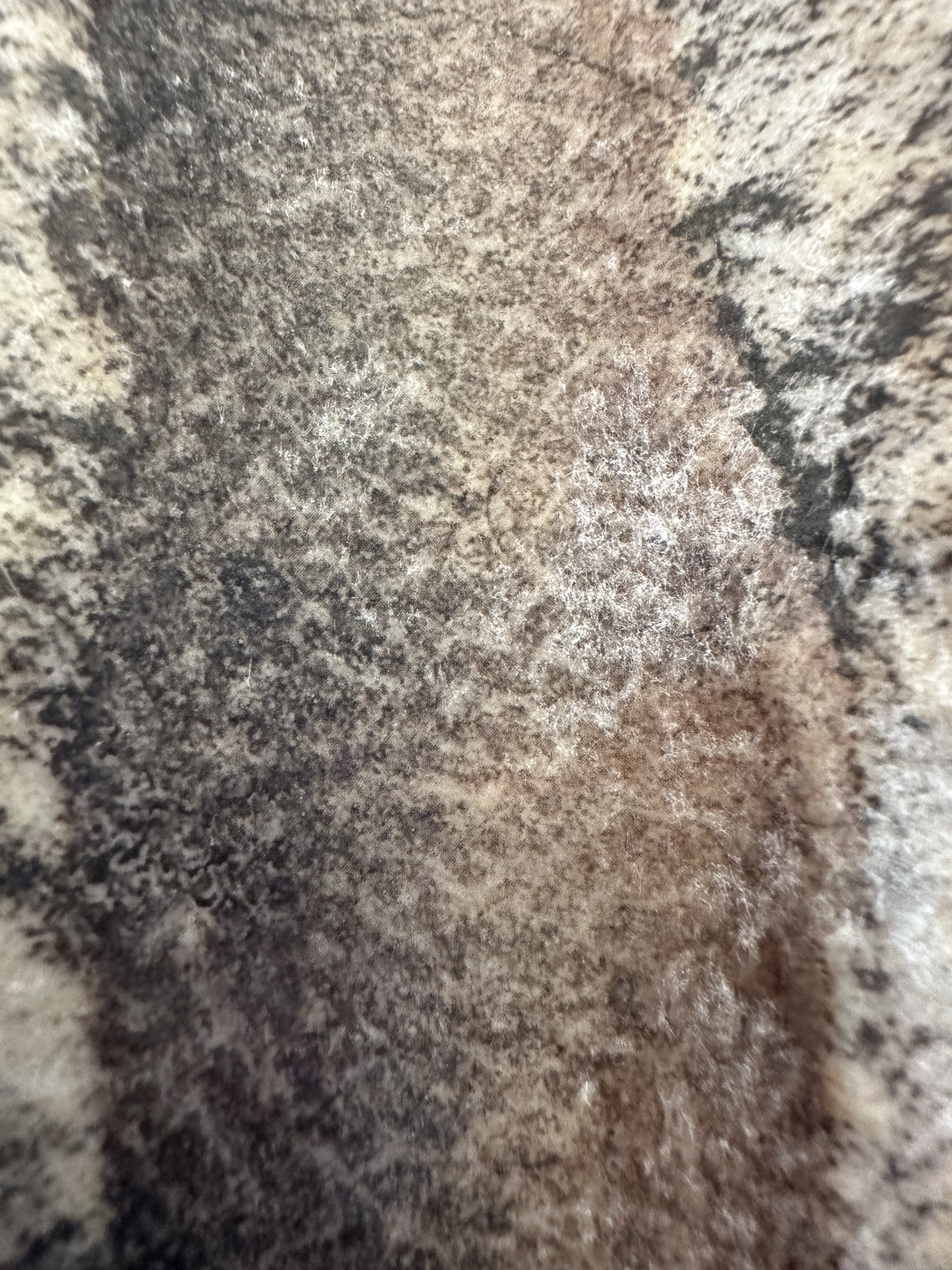
Cast of a skin impression from the foot of "Bloody Mary"

In October 2025, the validity of Nanotyrannus was affirmed in an extensive paper by Lindsay Zanno and James Napoli, in which the "Bloody Mary" specimen (NCSM 40000) was re-examined. The authors found that NCSM 40000 was skeletally mature at the time of its death, based on 25 cyclical growth marks indicating at least 14 years of growth, and that it had died between the ages of 17–22. In the same paper, Zanno and Napoli concluded that another Nanotyrannus specimen, Jane (BMRP 2002.4.1), which they assigned to N. lethaeus, died between the ages of 8–14. For these specimens to fit within the ontogenetic range of Tyrannosaurus, that taxon would need to spend the first two decades of its life growing slowly before entering an abrupt plateau, and finally re-entering a lengthy growth phase—an ontogeny pattern not seen in any archosaur that contradicts skeletal fusion patterns observed in NCSM 40000. Furthermore, they concluded that many of the traits commonly cited as ontogenetically plastic (i.e. variations in tooth count) were subject instead to individual variation. Further, they noted that certain traits, such as the "obliteration and resorption of a sinus" which would be necessary for Nanotyrannus and Tyrannosaurus to represent the same taxon, have no precedent among living amniotes. Bone proportions were another difference cited by Zanno and Napoli, as some of the arm, wrist, and hand bones of Nanotyrannus are larger than equivalent bones in Tyrannosaurus. There are no amniotes known to the authors that undergo any degree of absolute limb shrinkage, merely instances where limbs grew slower than the rest of the body and became proportionally smaller.

Zanno and Napoli's paper has led some paleontologists who were previously skeptical of Nanotyrannus to accept it as a valid taxon. Authors who have authored papers questioning Nanotyrannus' validity, such as Thomas Carr, Steve Brusatte and David Hone, accepted that the "Bloody Mary" specimen was a distinct species from Tyrannosaurus rex, with Brusatte commenting that the "overarching mic drop of this paper...is that Nanotyrannus is real." Other paleontologists like Holly Woodward Ballard emphasized that new research always has the potential to overturn hypotheses, like those regarding species-level delimitations, and Carr and Brusatte objected to the classification of the juvenile tyrannosaurid BMRP 2002.4.1 "Jane" as Nanotyrannus lethaeus, with Carr opining that Nanotyrannus should be considered a species within the Tyrannosaurus genus.

In December 2025, Christopher T. Griffin and colleagues published the results of a study indicating that histology (microscopic study of the living organism's tissue) of hyoid bones could be used to assess the ontogenetic maturity of archosaurs. After sampling the hyoids of the N. lancensis holotype, the researchers concluded that it belongs to a mature individual, and thus a species distinct from Tyrannosaurus rex. They further suggested that other eutyrannosaurs similar in size and morphology to the N. lancensis holotype may be taxonomically distinct from it and T. rex. In January 2026, another publication describing the histology of many Tyrannosaurus hindlimb bones, led by Holly Woodward, corroborated similar results to previous studies finding the growth rate of specimens assigned to Nanotyrannus such as BMRP 2002.4.1 to be inconsistent with the growth curve of Tyrannosaurus rex. In an October 2026 publication describing the possible hyoid bone or cervical rib of the pachycephalosaurian Dracorex hogwartsia, D. Cary Woodruff and colleagues questioned the reliability of hyoid bone histology for determining skeletal maturity. They criticized that the only comparison between hyoid bone and femur histology from the dataset of Griffin and colleagues involved an immature American alligator, and suggested that alternative explanations can be attributed for the hyoid bone features proposed to be indicative of maturity.

In September 2026, Sancarlo & Paul suggested that N. lethaeus should be placed in a genus distinct from Nanotyrannus, which they named Gilmoretyrannus, creating the new combination Gilmoretyrannus lethaeus. They further proposed that specimen NCSM 40000 represented a new genus and species, which they named Larsonvenator elegans.

== Description ==
=== Size ===
Size of N. lethaeus based on BMRP 2002.4.1 (right, blue), compared to three specimens of T. rex

Nanotyrannus was a mid-sized tyrannosauroid. Although no body size estimates were given in the 1988 description of the holotype, the accompanying press release noted that the animal would have reached approximately 17 ft (5.2 m) long and weighed 1,000 lb (450 kg). A later estimate suggested a greater length of 6 metres (20 ft). In their 2025 publication arguing for the validity of the genus, Zanno and Napoli provided body mass estimates of 703.78 kg (1,551.6 lb) for N. lancensis (specifically NCSM 40000) and over 833 kg (1,836 lb) for N. lethaeus (the holotype, BMRP 2002.4.1). BMRP 2002.4.1 was not mature at the time of its death, however, and adult N. lethaeus may have weighed around 1,200 kg (2,600 lb). A paper from the previous year estimated that the maximum body mass of the genus may have been approximately 1,500 kg (3,300 lb).

=== Skull and dentition ===
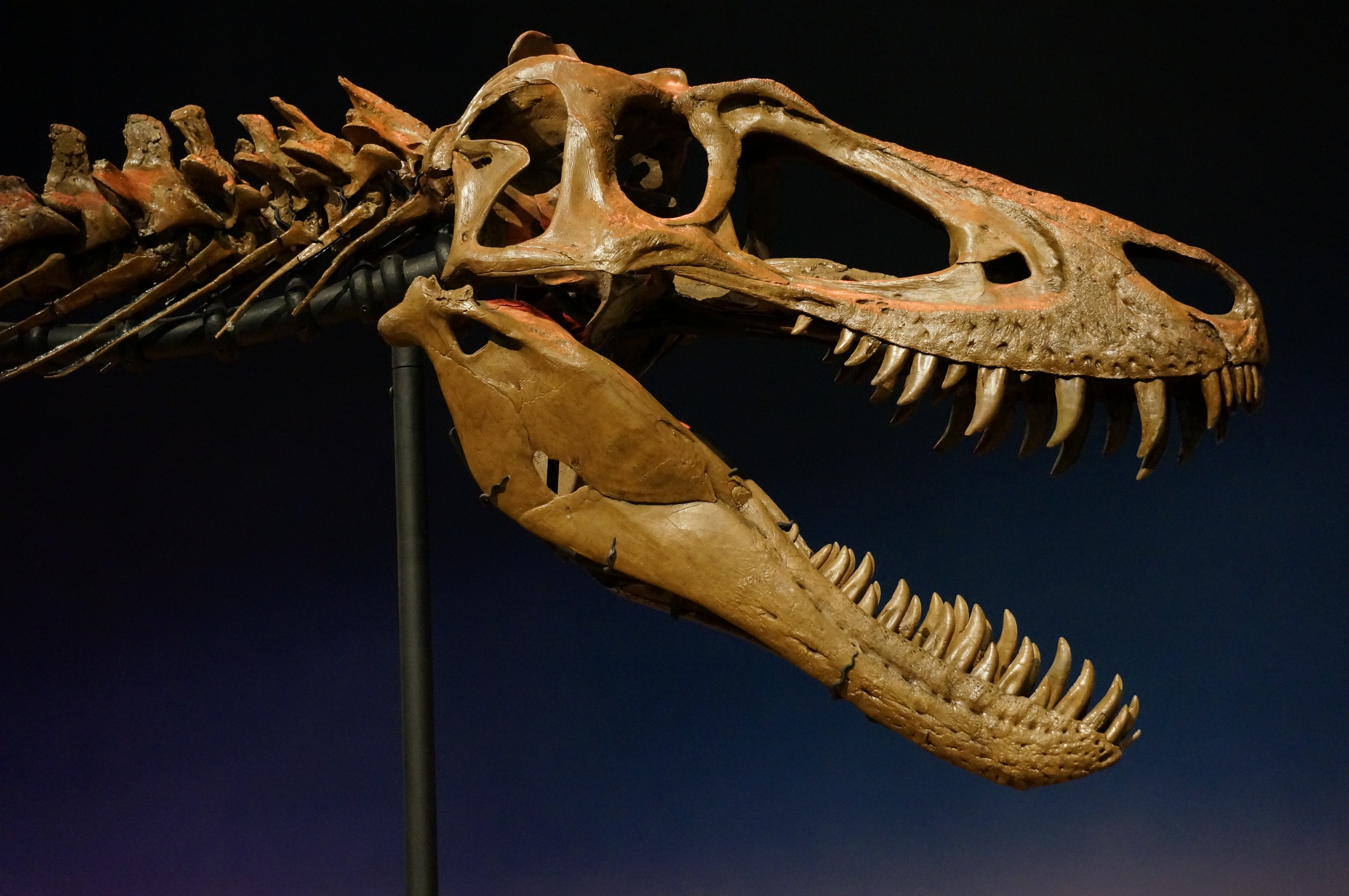
Reconstructed skull of the N. lethaeus holotype ("Jane") at the Burpee Museum of Natural History. The small foramen on the quadratojugal is visible.

The holotype skull (CMNH 7541) of Nanotyrannus measures 57.2 cm (22.5 in) when measured from the anterior (front) tip of the premaxilla to the posterior (rear) tip of the quadrate. That of NCSM 40000 measures 71.3 cm (28.1 in) in length, and has a maximum width of 27.3 cm (10.7 in).

In many tyrannosauroids, the point of contact between the premaxilla and maxilla bears a prominent subnarial foramen along its ventral (lower) extremity; this is absent in every specimen of Nanotyrannus. Like most tyrannosaurids, the lateral (outer) surface of the subnarial process faces dorsolaterally (upwards and outwards) in N. lancensis. In contrast, this process faces dorsomedially (upwards and towards the midline) in Daspletosaurus and Tyrannosaurus. The maxilla of Nanotyrannus is long and low, lacking deep fossae on its subcutaneous surface, which are present in tyrannosaurids such as Albertosaurus, Tarbosaurus, and Tyrannosaurus; that of N. lethaeus bears a weak maxillary flange; a similar structure is seen in Gorgosaurus, albeit far more pronounced. The maxillary fenestra, the small skull opening in front of the antorbital fenestra, resembles that of Bistahieversor in N. lancensis, whereas that of N. lethaeus is more like that of tyrannosaurids. The nasal bones are partly fused, with large, well-developed processes on their posterolateral (rearward and to the side) surfaces.

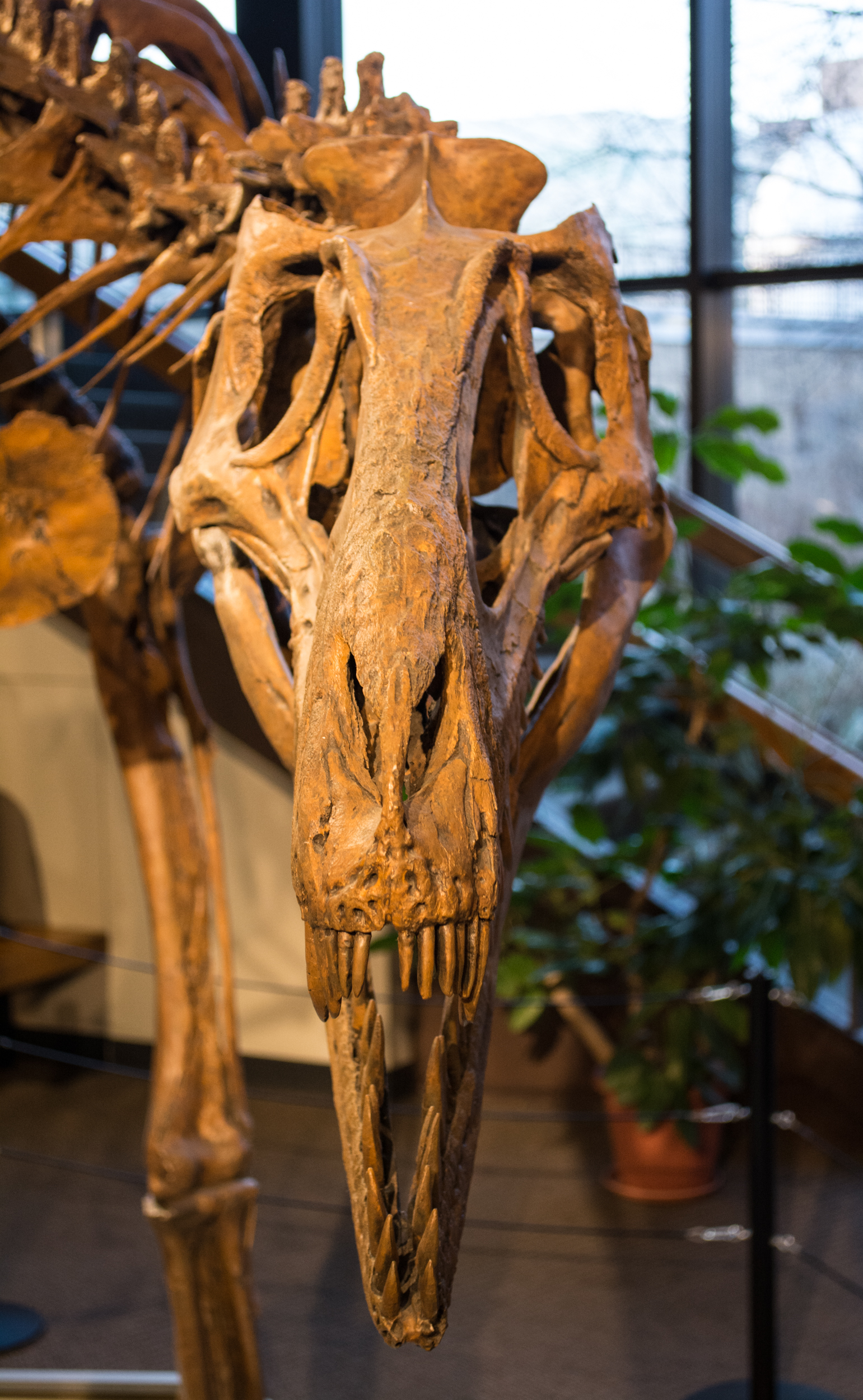
Skull replica of the "Jane" specimen in front view

Like many tyrannosauroids, the lacrimal of Nanotyrannus has a convex cornual process, a structure which would have supported a keratinous structure in life. Conversely, a cornual process is completely absent in Tyrannosaurus. The postorbital bone has no cornual process, which is unusual among eutyrannosaurs, as even young tyrannosaurids had one. Unlike Bistahieversor, Daspletosaurus, Tarbosaurus, and Tyrannosaurus, the jugal of Nanotyrannus lacks a lateral fossa on its postorbital process. The parietal bone has a thin sagittal crest, expanding posteriorly into a large nuchal crest; this crest lacks the parasagittal fossae present in the nuchal crests of both Albertosaurus and Tyrannosaurus. Unlike both tyrannosaurids and more basal tyrannosauroids, but like Xiongguanlong, the quadratojugal and squamosal bones form a long flange. As in Daspletosaurus horneri (at least the paratype specimen), and an isolated quadratojugal from the Dinosaur Park Formation, the quadratojugal of Nanotyrannus is invaded by pneumatic structures, and thus bears a prominent foramen. The vomer has a deep keel on its ventral portion, similar to Daspletosaurus, and is lance-shaped rather than diamond-shaped as in more derived tyrannosaurids. The basitubera (muscle attachment sites at the back of the head) of Nanotyrannus were strongly laterally expanded, suggesting that the head could be strongly flexed sideways.

The dentary of Nanotyrannus (the tooth-bearing bone of the lower jaw), has a rounded anterior margin. The dentaries of both species lack chins, unlike tyrannosaurids such as Tyrannosaurus. In N. lethaeus, the ventral region of the mandibular symphysis is ridged. The lateral edge of the dentary, at least in the holotype, shows a clear line of separation between the dentary at the front, and the surangular and angular bones at the back.

The premaxillary teeth of Nanotyrannus are distinct from those of other tyrannosauroids in that they were completely devoid of serrations, like Moros, Timurlengia, and Xiongguanlong; whilst the presence or absence of serrations has been suggested to vary with ontogeny, they are likely a diagnostic trait in the case of Nanotyrannus. Each premaxilla bore four chisel-shaped teeth. The maxillae of Nanotyrannus have variable tooth counts: the holotype specimen preserves fifteen, NCSM 40000 has sixteen on the left maxilla and seventeen on the right maxilla, and N. lethaeus appears to have sixteen per maxilla. This is higher than the maxillary tooth count of any tyrannosaurid, save for Alioramus and Daspletosaurus. Unlike Daspletosaurus, Tarbosaurus, and Tyrannosaurus, but like many other tyrannosauroids, the most anterior tooth of each maxilla was small and resembled those of the premaxillae. Unlike most tyrannosaurids, the maxillary teeth were ziphodont. Nanotyrannus has between sixteen and eighteen teeth per dentary, a higher count than in any tyrannosaurid except for Alioramus and Daspletosaurus. In N. lancensis, the two most anterior alveoli (tooth sockets) of the dentary are far smaller than those behind them. In N. lethaeus, meanwhile, only the first is small, as in Tyrannosaurus.

=== Postcranial skeleton ===
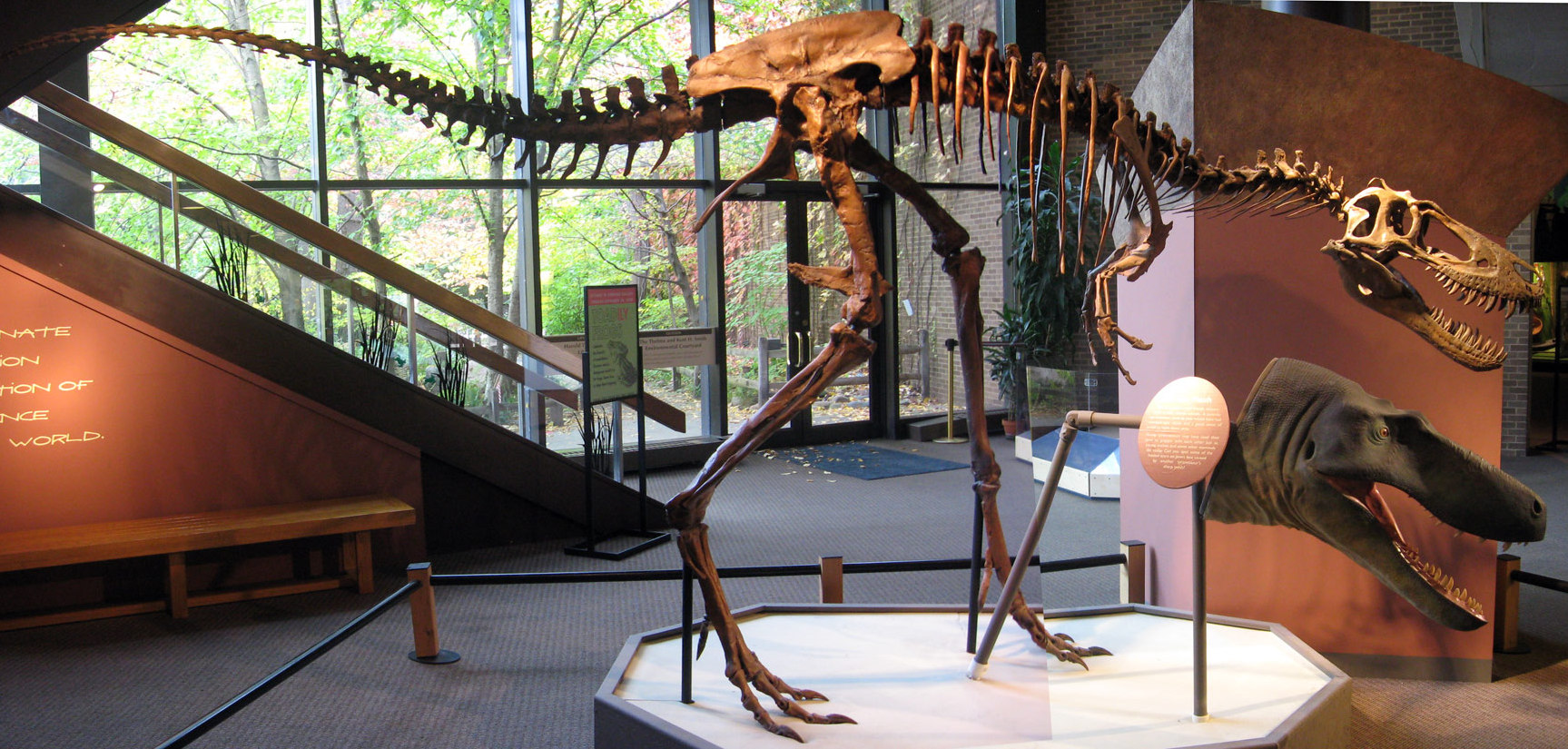
Cast of the N. lethaeus "Jane" skeleton

The vertebral column of Nanotyrannus appears to consist of twenty presacral vertebrae (those before the sacrum), and thirty-five caudal (tail) vertebrae. The morphology and count of many of these vertebrae is difficult to determine, since in the most complete specimen, much of the presacral column is obscured by preserved soft tissue in the well-preserved "Bloody Mary" specimen. In Nanotyrannus, the morphology of the axis, the second cervical (neck) vertebra, differs between species. The axis of N. lancensis has a straight neural spine (the large projection on the dorsal surface), one lacking any projections on its anterior surface, whereas that of N. lethaeus is crenulate, bearing small ridges. Additionally, N. lancensis has several pleurocoels (hollows in the bone for pneumaticity) in the axis, whereas N. lethaeus has only one. The caudal vertebrae of N. lancensis are pneumatised, whereas those of N. lethaeus are not.

The glenoid fossa of Nanotyrannus extends to the scapula's lateral surface. The arms of Nanotyrannus are proportionally very large, proportionally more similar to basal tyrannosauroids than to those of tyrannosaurids. The distal (further from the body) end of the humerus (upper arm bone) of Nanotyrannus bears five tubercles, unlike other eutyrannosaurs. The distal portion of the ulna (one of the two lower arm bones), is convex, with a strong medial projection. The wrist consists of four carpal bones. The manus (hand) is similar in some ways to albertosaurines, though it grossly differs in some regards from tyrannosaurids. The first metacarpal is subtriangular and reduced, unlike tyrannosaurs. Unlike all other coelurosaurs, the proximal (inner, towards the body) articular surface of the second metacarpal may have contacted the forearm during wrist flexion. The manus was functionally didactyl (two-fingered), though it does retain the first phalanx (finger bone) of a vestigial third digit, as in Gorgosaurus; Tyrannosaurus also retains such a structure, though unlike Gorgosaurus and Nanotyrannus, it is fused with the preceding bone. The first phalanx of the second metacarpal of Nanotyrannus bears a deep extensor pit with a prominent proximal tubercle. The first phalanx of the first manual digit is nearly twice the size of that of the equivalent bone in Tyrannosaurus. The ungual phalanges of Nanotyrannus, the bones which would have supported claws in life, were large, and the second was laterally compressed.

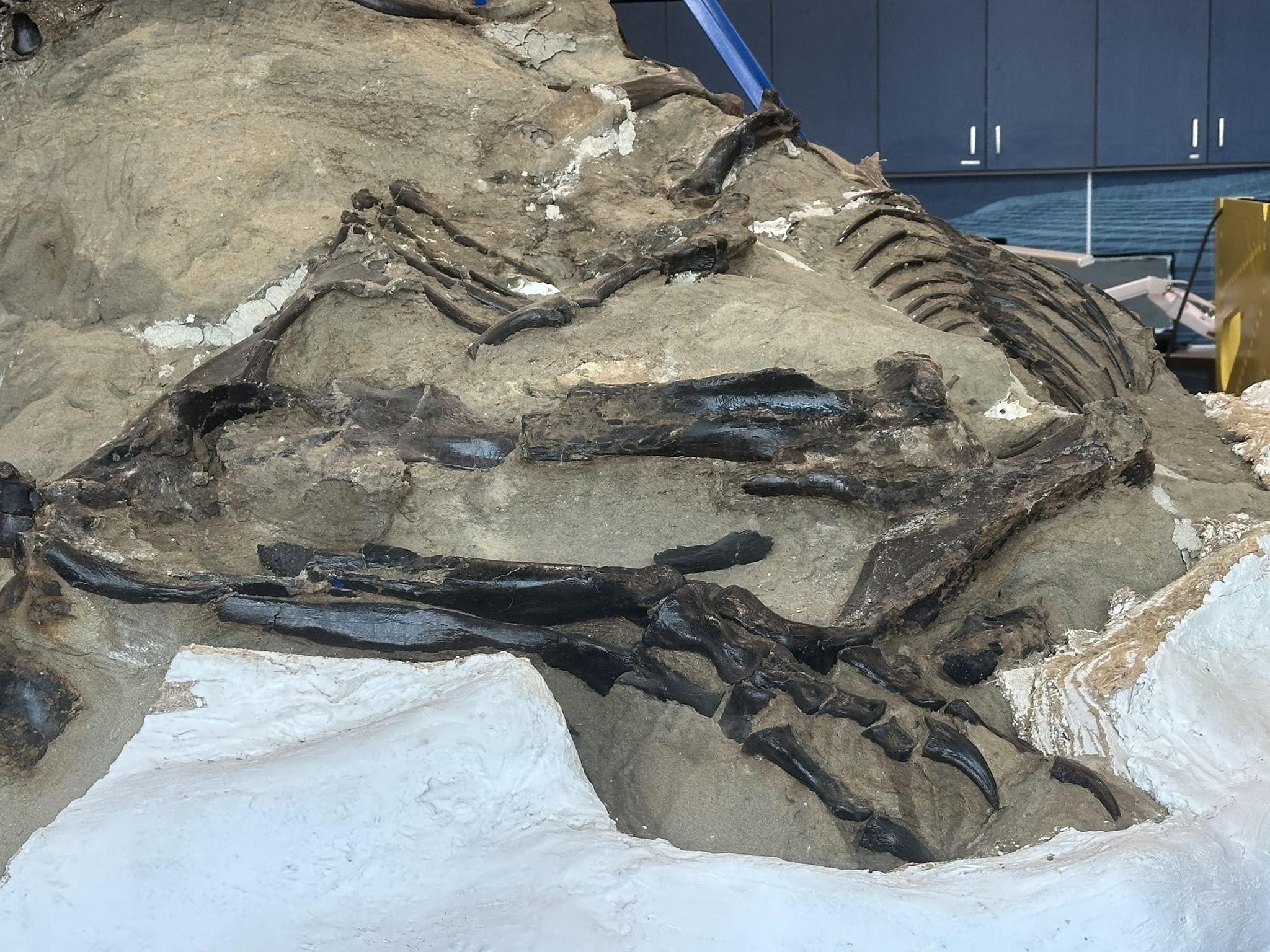
The hind limbs of the "Bloody Mary" specimen of N. lancensis

The hind limbs of Nanotyrannus are proportionally very long compared to those of other eutyrannosaurs. Unlike tyrannosaurines, the femur (thigh bone) of Nanotyrannus retains a fossa on its distal medial surface. As in Moros and the Teratophoneus specimen UMNH VP 16690, the fourth trochanter, (structure to which the caudofemoralis muscle attaches), is parallel to the femoral shaft, and in N. lethaeus does not form a peak. Like Bistahieversor and Tyrannosaurus, the crista tibiofibularis (ridge on the medial portion of the fibula to which the tibia articulated), is enormous, raised from the lateral condyle by a pedicle, and concave medioposteriorly. Despite its body size being far smaller, the metatarsals of NCSM 40000 are almost as long as those of the very largest Tyrannosaurus specimens. The extreme proportions of their "hypercursorial" hind limbs may correlate to a different lifestyle from tyrannosaurids, one adapted more toward pursuit predation. The distal condyle of the fourth metatarsal is longer in N. lethaeus than in N. lancensis.

== Classification ==
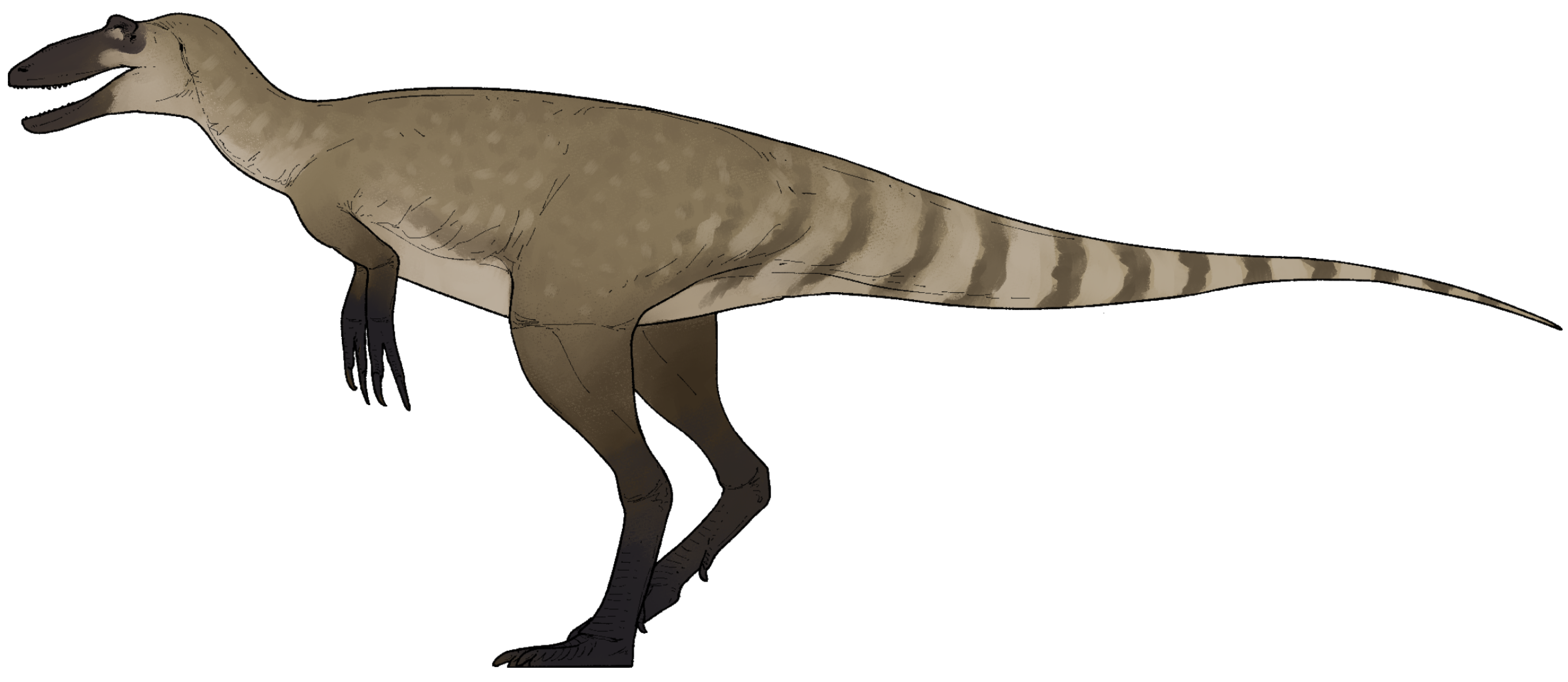
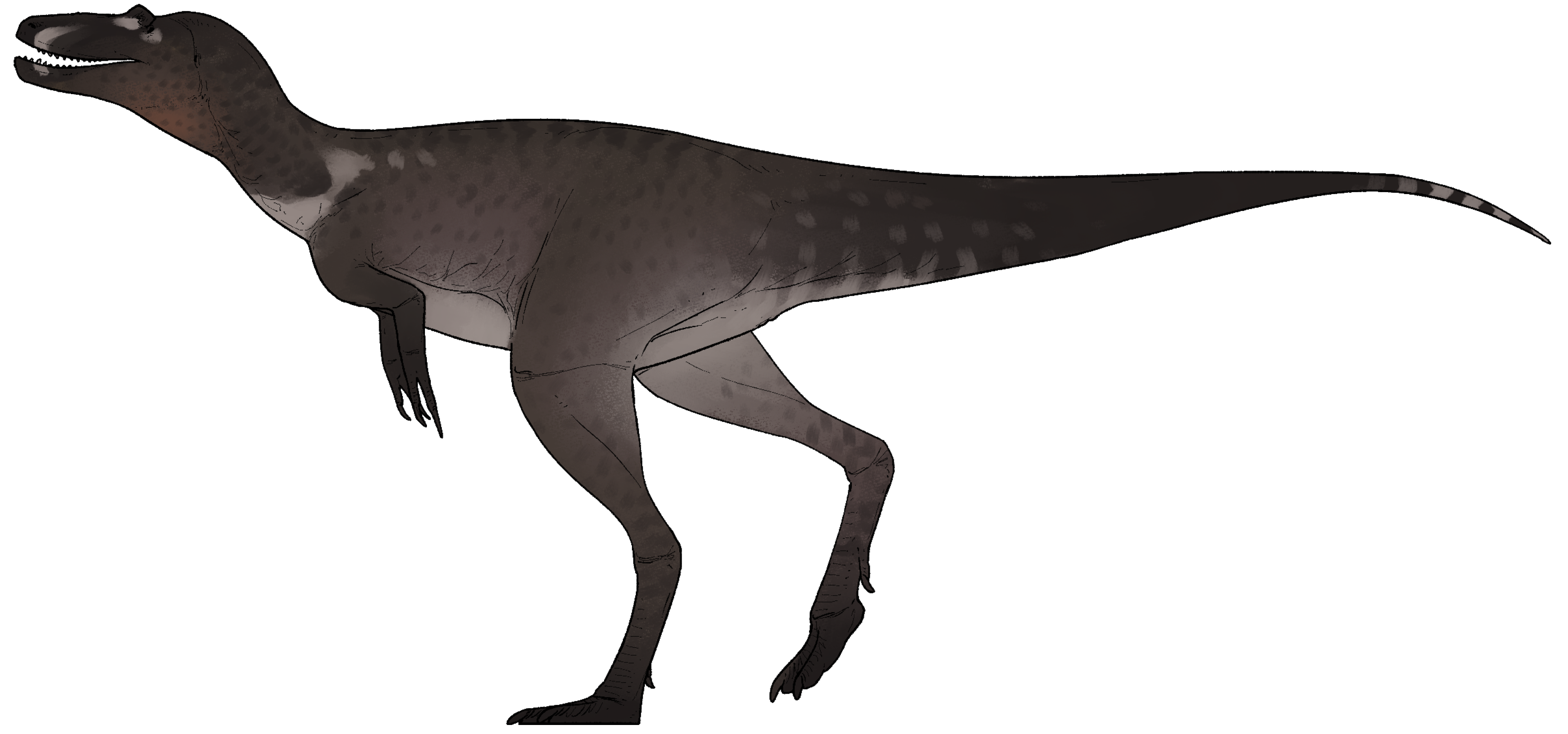
Speculative life restorations of N. lancensis (top) and N. lethaeus (bottom)

The classification of Nanotyrannus has varied over time, with some studies suggesting that it was a sister taxon to Tyrannosaurus, while others have interpreted it as either a basal tyrannosauroid or an albertosaurine. In their 2025 paper, Zanno and Napoli conducted two phylogenetic analyses using an extensive novel dataset focused on sampling tyrannosauroids. Both recovered Nanotyrannus as a member of the Eutyrannosauria in a new clade deemed the Nanotyrannidae, which is the sister taxon to the Tyrannosauridae. As such, it is only distantly related to 'derived' tyrannosaurines like Tyrannosaurus. However, the exact resolution of taxa within and in relation to the Nanotyrannidae differs between both analyses. The first, a maximum parsimony analysis (shown below as Topology A) recovered the 'mid'-Cretaceous taxon Moros intrepidus as the sister taxon to the Nanoyrannus lethaeus holotype ("Jane", BMRP 2002.4.1), while all other specimens (Nanotyrannus lancensis) were recovered in an unresolved polytomous clade. The second, a Bayesian inference analysis implementing a fossilized birth–death (BI-FBD) model (shown below as Topology B), placed Moros outside as a non-eutyrannosaurian as the sister to Timurlengia. Meanwhile, the Appalachian tyrannosauroids Appalachiosaurus and Dryptosaurus were found as the successive earliest-diverging branches within the Nanotyrannidae. Referencing this analysis, Zanno and Napoli suggested that the most recent common ancestor (MRCA) between Nanotyrannidae and Tyrannosauridae may have lived roughly 103 million years ago, around the time of the formation of the Western Interior Seaway. The formation of the seaway may have resulted in their divergence, with tyrannosaurids inhabiting the western island continent of Laramidia, and nanotyrannids inhabiting the eastern island continent of Appalachia. The authors noted that further testing and more data would be required to support the results of one analysis over the other.

Topology A: Maximum parsimony tree (K = 12)

- Tyrannosauroidea
  - Proceratosauridae
  - Pantyrannosauria
    - - Dilong paradoxus
      - Eotyrannus lengi
    - - Suskityrannus hazelae
      - - Xiongguanlong baimoensis
        - - Timurlengia euotica
          - - - Appalachiosaurus montgomeriensis
              - - Alectrosaurus olseni
                - Khankhuuluu mongoliensis
            - Eutyrannosauria
              - Dryptosaurus aquilunguis
              - - Nanotyrannidae
                  - - Moros intrepidus
                    - N. lethaeus
                      (BMRP 2002.4.1)
                  - N. lancensis
                    - BMRP 2006.4.4
                    - CMNH 7541
                      (N. lancensis holotype)
                    - NCSM 40000
                      ("Bloody Mary")
                    - KUVP 156375
                - Tyrannosauridae
                  - Albertosaurinae
                    ⊞
                    - - Bistahieversor sealeyi
                      - UMNH VP 16690
                    - - Jinbeisaurus wangi
                      - - TCMI 2001.81.1
                        - - Teratophoneus curriei
                          - - UALVP 52981
                              (Tromerosaurus solumons holotype)
                            - - Gorgosaurus sp. nov
                              - - Gorgosaurus libratus
                                - - Albertosaurus sarcophagus
                                  - Albertosaurus sp. nov
                    ⊟
                  - Tyrannosaurinae
                    - Alioramini
                      ⊞	Alioramus altai; Qianzhousaurus sinensis	⊟
                    - - Asiatyrannus xui
                      - - Thanatotheristes degrootorum
                        - - Daspletosaurus
                            ⊞
                            - Daspletosaurus wilsoni
                            - - Daspletosaurus horneri
                              - Daspletosaurus torosus
                            ⊟
                          - Tyrannosaurini
                            ⊞
                            - Lythronax argestes
                            - - Zhuchengtyrannus magnus
                              - - Tarbosaurus bataar
                                - - Tyrannosaurus mcraeensis
                                  - Tyrannosaurus rex
                            ⊟

Topology B: BI-FBD tree

- Tyrannosauroidea
  - Proceratosauridae
  - Pantyrannosauria
    - - Dilong paradoxus
      - Eotyrannus lengi
    - - Xiongguanlong baimoensis
      - - - Suskityrannus hazelae
          - - Alectrosaurus olseni
            - Khankhuuluu mongoliensis
        - - - Moros intrepidus
            - Timurlengia euotica
          - Eutyrannosauria
            - Nanotyrannidae
              - Appalachiosaurus montgomeriensis
              - - Dryptosaurus aquilunguis
                - - N. lethaeus
                    (BMRP 2002.4.1)
                  - N. lancensis
                    - BMRP 2006.4.4
                    - - CMNH 7541
                        (N. lancensis holotype)
                      - - KUVP 156375
                        - NCSM 40000
                          ("Bloody Mary")
            - Tyrannosauridae
              - Albertosaurinae
                ⊞
                - - Bistahieversor sealeyi
                  - Jinbeisaurus wangi
                - - UALVP 52981
                    (Tromerosaurus solumons holotype)
                  - - - TCMI 2001.81.1
                      - Gorgosaurus sp. nov
                    - - Gorgosaurus libratus
                      - - Albertosaurus sarcophagus
                        - Albertosaurus sp. nov
                ⊟
              - Tyrannosaurinae
                - - Lythronax argestes
                  - - Teratophoneus curriei
                    - UMNH VP 16690
                - - Alioramini
                    ⊞
                    - Asiatyrannus xui
                    - - Alioramus altai
                      - Qianzhousaurus sinensis
                    ⊟
                  - - Thanatotheristes degrootorum
                    - - Daspletosaurus
                        ⊞
                        - Daspletosaurus horneri
                        - - Daspletosaurus torosus
                          - Daspletosaurus wilsoni
                        ⊟
                      - Tyrannosaurini
                        ⊞
                        - Zhuchengtyrannus magnus
                        - - Tarbosaurus bataar
                          - - Tyrannosaurus mcraeensis
                            - Tyrannosaurus rex
                        ⊟

== Paleobiology ==
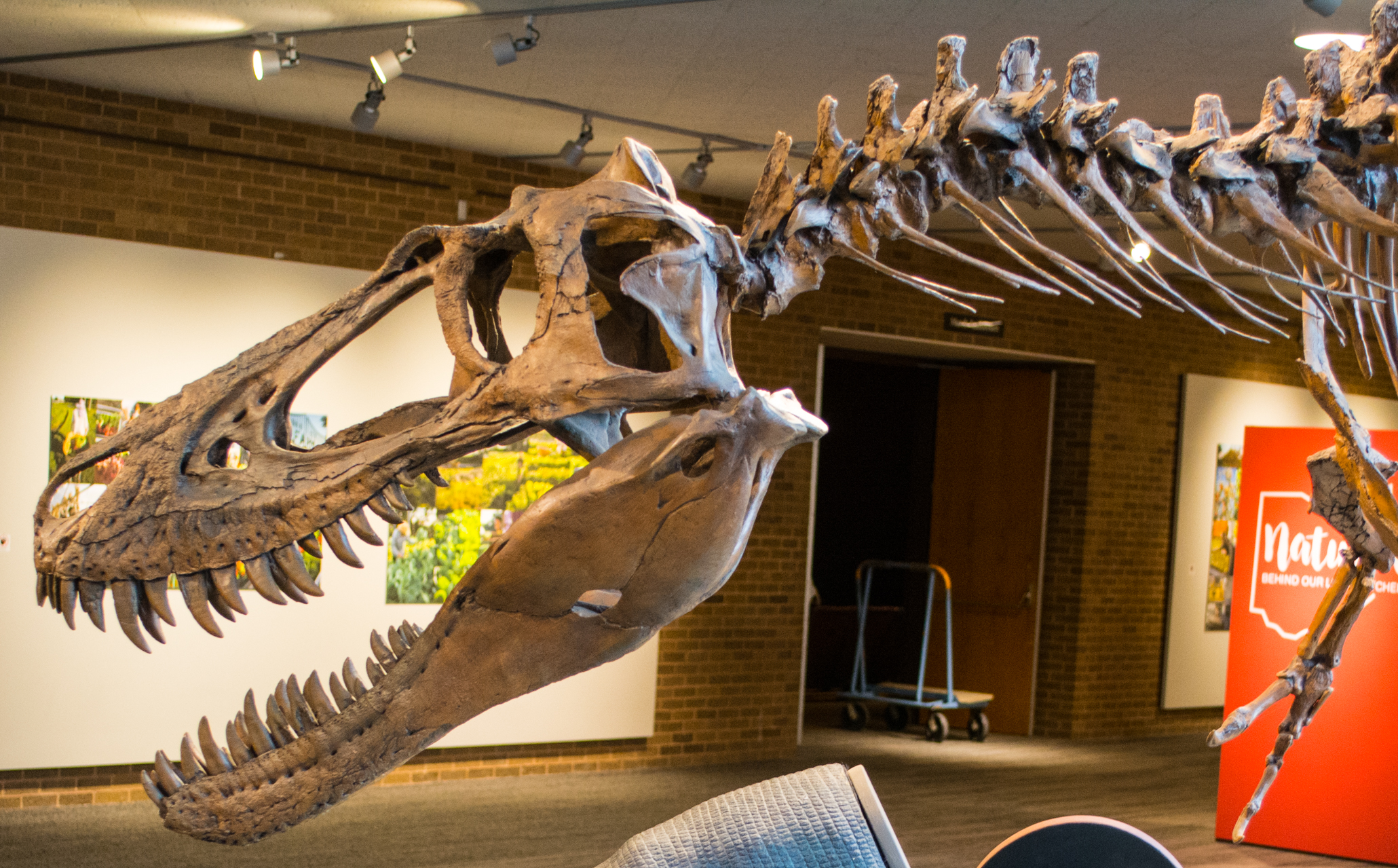
Left side of "Jane"'s reconstructed skull at Cleveland Museum. The maxilla shows puncture marks interpreted as bite marks from a conspecific

Evidence of intraspecific attack was found by Joseph Peterson and his colleagues in Jane, then thought to be a juvenile Tyrannosaurus. Peterson and his team found that Jane's skull showed healed puncture wounds on the upper jaw and snout, which they believe came from another juvenile Tyrannosaurus. Subsequent CT scans of Jane's skull would further confirm the team's hypothesis, showing that the puncture wounds came from a traumatic injury and that there was subsequent healing. The team would also state that Jane's injuries were structurally different from the parasite-induced lesions found in the adult Tyrannosaurus Sue and that Jane's injuries were on its face whereas the parasite that infected Sue caused lesions to the lower jaw. In 2021, Peterson and colleagues also used Jane's maxillary tooth to estimate the bite force of a tyrannosaur that produced the puncture marks on Jane, and concluded that Jane and similarly sized juvenile Tyrannosaurus had a bite force of 5,269-5,641 N, higher than the previously estimated maximum bite force of Jane (2,400-3,850 N) by Bates and Falkingham in 2012.

Nanotyrannus is thought to have been significantly faster than an adult T. rex. In 2016, Scott Persons and Philip Currie calculated the cursorial limb proportion (CLP) score of various theropod specimens, including Jane and the "Bloody Mary" specimen (then accessioned as BHI 6437), as an indicator to identify which theropod species had higher or lower running speeds. The CLP scores of Jane and the "Bloody Mary" specimen were 35.8 and 32.7 respectively, which were well above the CLP score of 11.5 for adult T. rex specimens, indicating that Nanotyrannus was more cursorily adapted than T. rex. In 2020, Alexander Dececchi and colleagues estimated that Jane had a maximum running speed of 12.57–13.82 m/s (45.3–49.8 km/h; 28.1–30.9 mph), nearly twice higher than that of adult T. rex with an estimated maximum running speed of 5.81–8.07 m/s (20.9–29.1 km/h; 13.0–18.1 mph), using the equation by Myriam Hirt and colleagues in 2017.

== Paleoecology ==
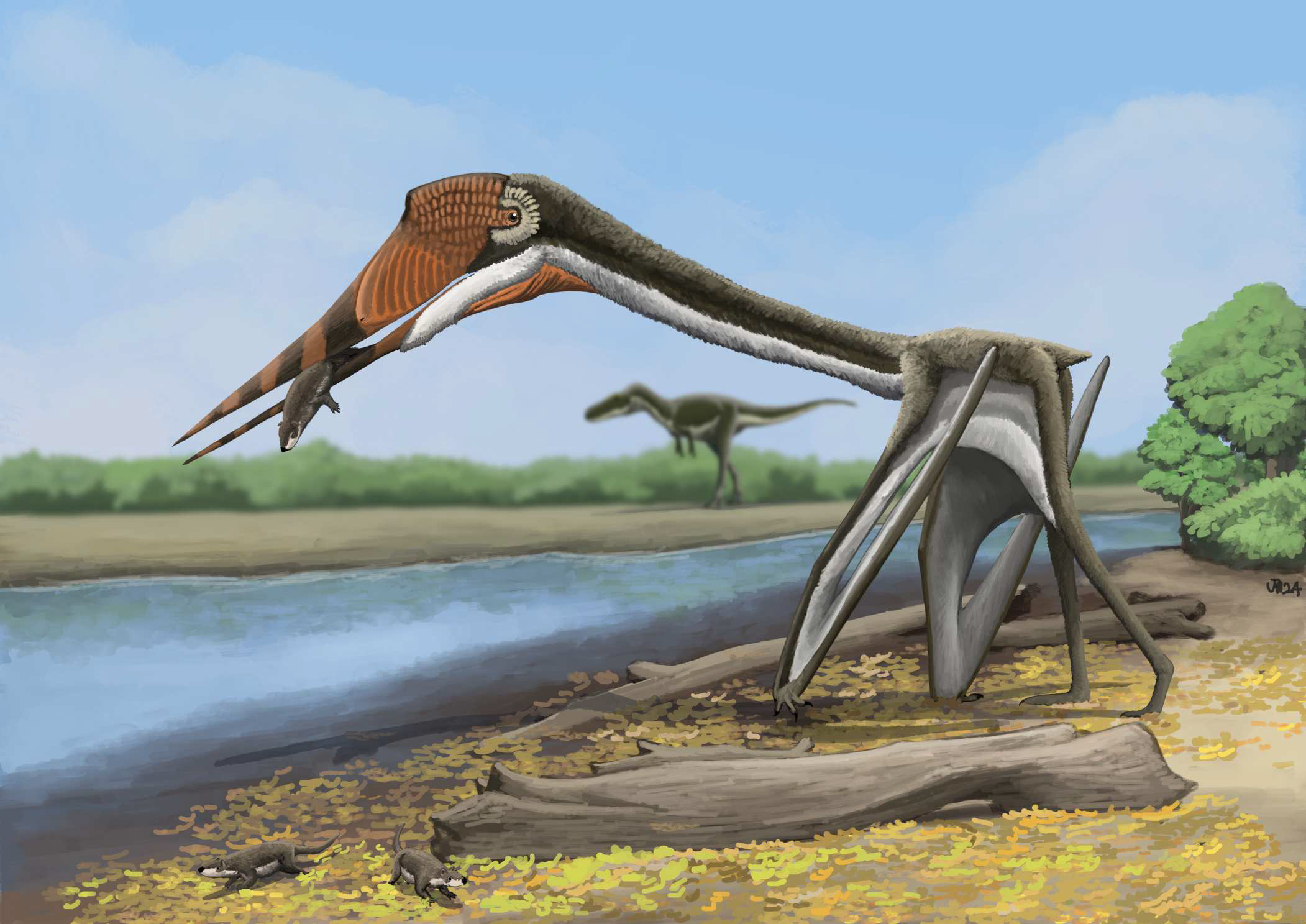
Reconstruction of the azhdarchid pterosaur Infernodrakon in the Hell Creek paleoenvironment, with N. lethaeus in the background

Nanotyrannus was first discovered in the Hell Creek Formation, which spans parts of modern-day Montana, South Dakota, North Dakota, and Wyoming. The depositional environment of this region was warm, humid, and swampy environment, reflecting maritime to subtropical conditions. The average temperatures ranged from 11.3 to 11.6 °C (52.3–52.9 °F).

The landscape featured lush, low-lying vegetation dominated by ferns, while the forest canopy consisted of a mixture of diverse conifers (redwoods, cypresses, and pine-like trees) and angiosperms (flowering plants including sycamores, members of the magnolia family, rosids, laurels, various palms, and more). Cycads and Ginkgo trees were also present.

The wetlands and waterways contained a diverse faunal assemblage. Small insects are known from what would have been the swampy forests, while the rivers and lagoons hosted invertebrates (bivalves and ammonites), fish (sharks, hybodonts, gars, and sturgeons), amphibians (frogs and salamanders), and various reptiles (turtles, crocodilians, the choristodere Champsosaurus, and mosasaurs in the coastal, brackish, and freshwater zones). Small terrestrial mammals and lizards were diverse, living alongside early snakes. The holotype of Infernodrakon, an azhdarchid pterosaur, is known from the Hell Creek formation, and was collected in the same field jacket as BMRP 2002.4.1 ("Jane"), the holotype of Nanotyrannus lethaeus.

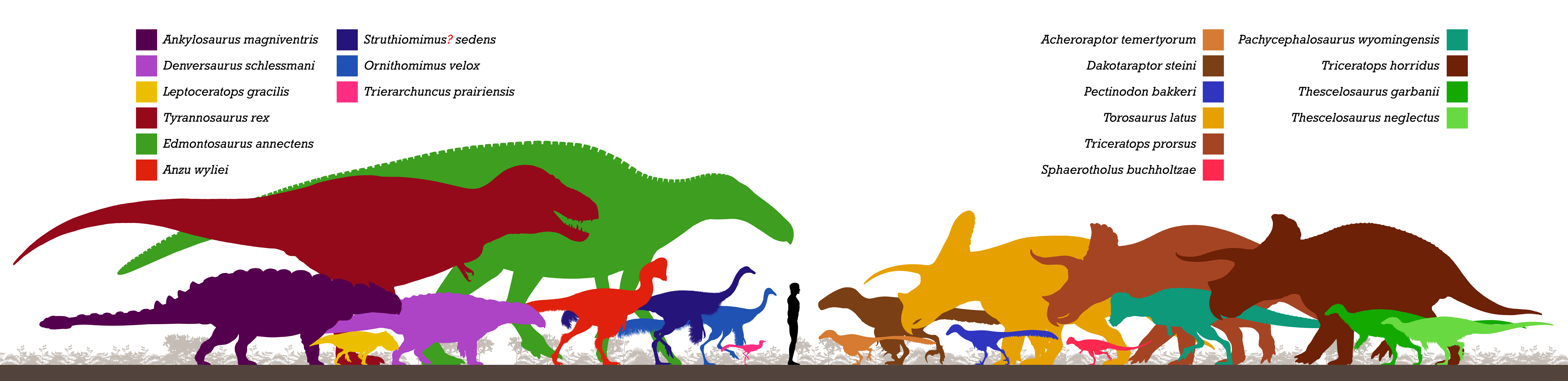
Size of select Hell Creek Formation dinosaurs compared to a human

The Hell Creek Formation is best known for its assemblage of charismatic dinosaurs. Non-avian theropods beside Nanotyrannus include the larger tyrannosaurid Tyrannosaurus, ornithomimosaurs (Struthiomimus and Ornithomimus), the alvarezsaurid Trierarchuncus, oviraptorosaurs (Anzu and Eoneophron), and the paravians Pectinodon (a troodontid) and Acheroraptor (a dromaeosaurid). Avialan dinosaurs include Avisaurus, Brodavis and Magnusavis. Ornithischian dinosaurs include the ankylosaurs Ankylosaurus (an ankylosaurid) and Denversaurus (a nodosaurid), the neornithischian Thescelosaurus, the hadrosaurid Edmontosaurus, pachycephalosaurs (Pachycephalosaurus, Platytholus, and Sphaerotholus), and ceratopsians (Leptoceratops, Torosaurus, and Triceratops).

Various tyrannosaur teeth from the Ferris Formation, originally described as Aublysodon, are reassigned to N. lancensis, with the stratigraphically youngest known tooth reported from a few meters below the K-Pg boundary zone. Nanotyrannid teeth fossils, potentially belonging to Nanotyrannus itself, are known from the Lance Formation. Footprints and an undescribed partial skeleton of a tyrannosaur potentially belonging to Nanotyrannus are known from the Lance Formation as well.

== See also ==
- Timeline of tyrannosaur research
