= Peter Larson =

American dinosaur dealer (born 1952)

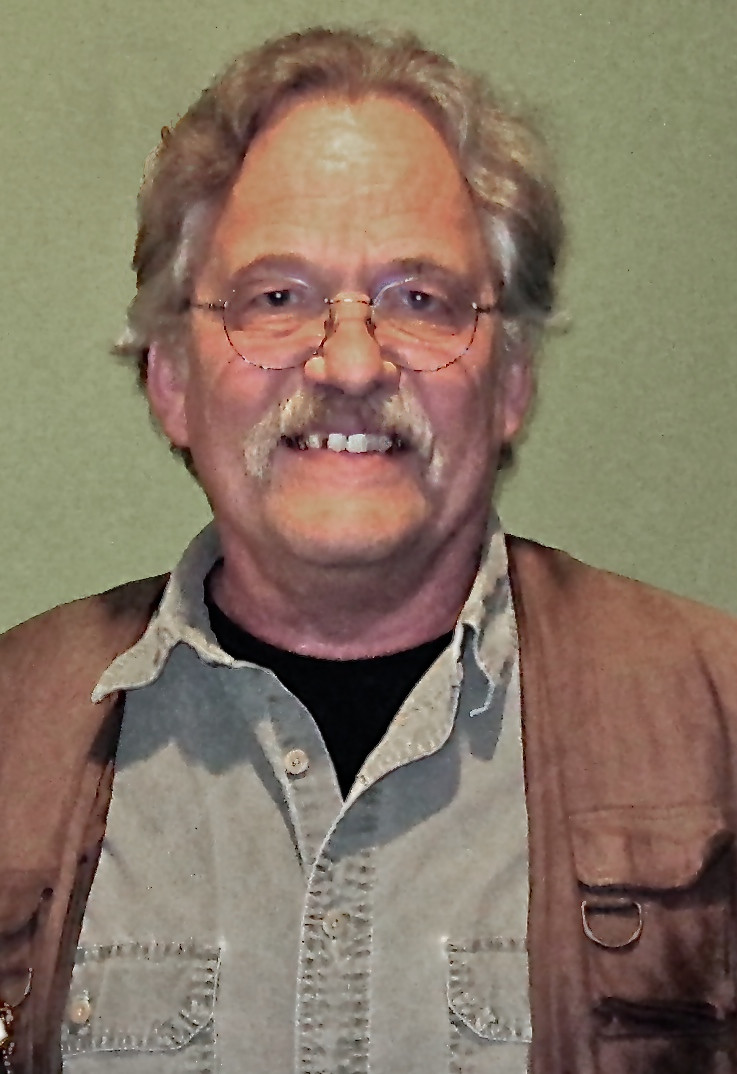
- Larson in 2014
- Born: Peter Lars Larson; 1952 (age 73–74)
- Education: South Dakota School of Mines and Technology (BA)
- Children: 3
- Criminal information
- Status: Convicted
- Convictions: 2 felony counts for United States customs violations involving money declaration and two misdemeanors for the illegal removal of two fossils, worth less than $100, from Federal land
- Penalty: 18 months in prison

Details
- Imprisoned at: Federal Correctional Complex, Florence

Peter Lars Larson (born 1952) is an American commercial fossil collector and researcher who is head of the Black Hills Institute of Geological Research, which specializes in the excavation, preparation, mounting, and replication of fossils. He led the team that excavated "Sue", one of the largest and most complete specimens of Tyrannosaurus rex, which was the subject of a legal dispute resulting in its seizure and public auction. In 1996, Larson was convicted of customs violations related to failing to declare money he had brought from overseas, and served 18 months in prison.

He has published scientific and popular works on dinosaur paleontology. Larson has been criticized by some paleontologists for his commercial enterprises and support of private collections.

== Education ==
Peter Larson grew up on a ranch near Mission, South Dakota. He began rock hunting at the age of four on his parents' ranch. He attended the South Dakota School of Mines to study palaeontology. He graduated with a bachelor's degree in 1974. Shortly after graduating college he started Black Hills Minerals.

== Early work ==
Larson founded what eventually became the Black Hills Institute in 1974. Robert Farrar and Neal Larson, his brother, later joined the company with 5% ownership and 35%, respectively, to Larson's 60%.

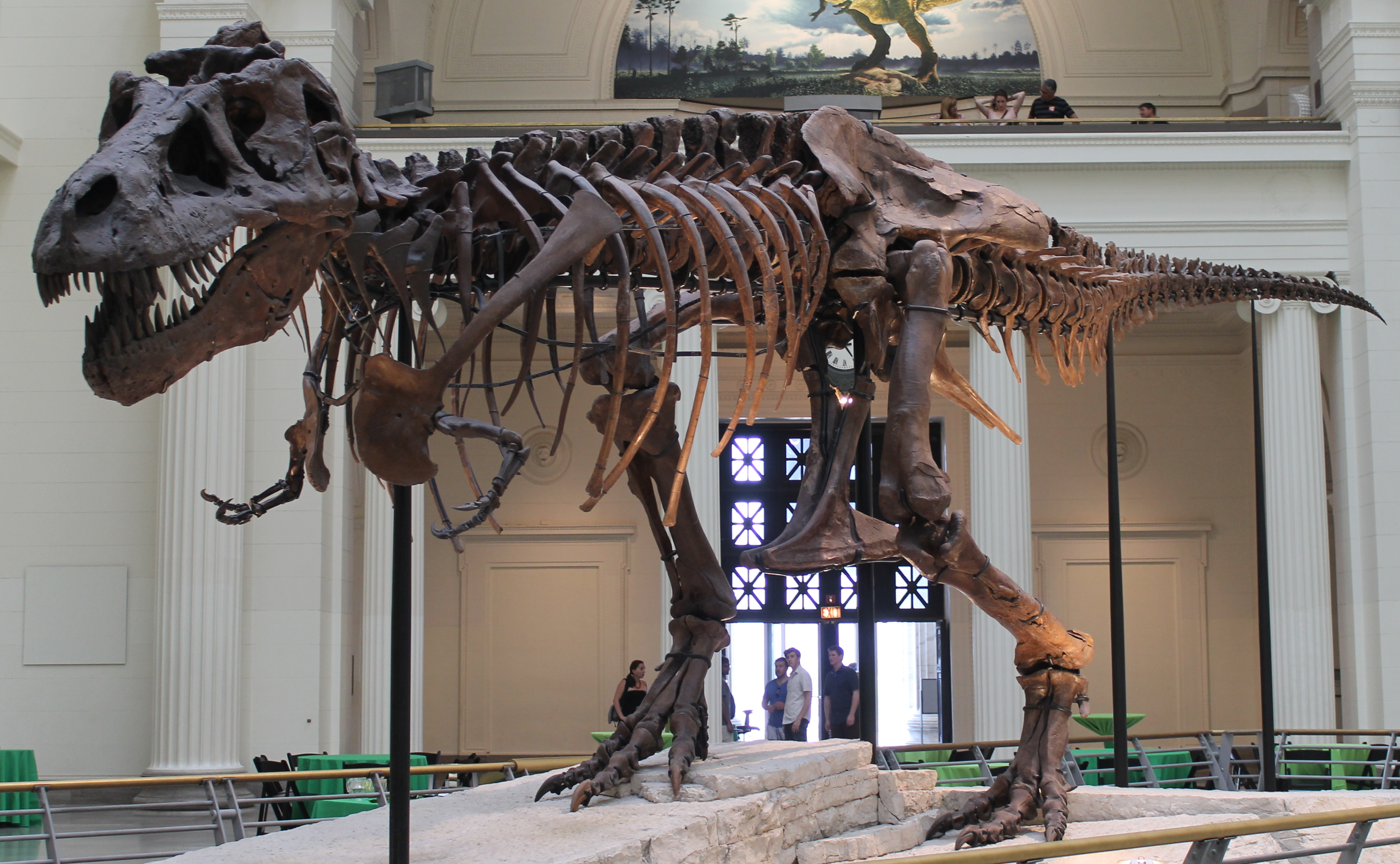
Sue on display at the Chicago Field Museum

== Sue, federal raid and criminal conviction ==
In 1990, Larson led the excavation of a substantially complete Tyrannosaurus rex skeleton later named "Sue". Larson paid the Sioux owner of the ranch on which the specimen was located, Maurice Williams, $5,000 for the find.

On 14 May 1992, a raid led by the states U.S. Attorney Kevin Shieffer with 35 FBI agents and 20 National Guardsmen recovered the Tyrannosaurus rex named "Sue" from the Black Hills Institute of Geological Research. The federal agents seized the fossil of "Sue", along with other fossils and records. The specimen was taken by the Bureau of Indian Affairs. Although Larson had paid the landowner for the find, Williams had reportedly changed his mind, and the U.S. Attorney charged that the fossil had been illegally taken from land under Federal administration, because the deeded land fell within the borders of a Native American reservation and the parcel itself was held by the Bureau of Indian Affairs for the benefit of its Native landowner. After the auction of Sue in 1997, which resulted in its sale to the Field Museum, Williams received $7.6 million.

Keith Nelson, the lead investigator for the Internal Revenue Service, said the evidence recovered at the Black Hills Institute was more than could have been investigated with "so many bones, so many animals, so many invertebrates that were taken off of public lands, taken internationally, sold internationally." The Justice Department charged Larson with conspiracy, obstruction of justice, illegal collection of fossils, theft of government property, wire fraud, making false statements to government agents and customs violations in November 1993. Following a trial on charges unrelated to "Sue", Larson was found guilty and convicted of two felony counts for United States customs violations involving cash brought from overseas, as well as two misdemeanours relating to illegally taking two fossils from federal land. Of the 149 charges faced by Larson and other Black Hills associates, the jury acquitted the defendants of 73 charges, found them guilty of 8 charges and did not reach a verdict on 68 charges. Richard Battey sentenced Larson to two years in Federal prison. Larson appealed to the Eighth Circuit Court against his conviction and was denied. Larson ended up serving 18 months in minimum security prison at the Federal Correctional Complex, Florence, Colorado.

In 1997, Larson told the PBS television program Nova that "The government's wrong. The government is not correct in what they've done here."

== Career ==
In 1992, Larson's team helped to discover the Tyrannosaurus rex specimen, Stan.

In 2013, Larson and colleagues began excavating at a site located in Wyoming, US containing the remnants of three nearly complete skeletons of Triceratops.

In 2012, Larson fired his brother, Neal, from the Black Hills Institute amid personal differences. Neal, owning a 35% share of the company, filed a lawsuit against Larson and others in 2015 alleging that he was being oppressed as a shareholder. He sought to liquidate the company to buy out his 35% share ownership and part ways. The court ruled that Neal's shareholder rights had been violated when he was not invited nor allowed to speak at the meeting where he was fired. The Black Hills Institute did not have enough cash for a buyout, causing Larson's fossil collection to be appraised. Several years later, the court ruled that Neal would receive the Tyrannosaurus rex skeleton "Stan", which was appraised at a value of $6 million at the time. "Stan" was sold for $32 million in 2020.

== Authorship ==
Larson has written and co-authored numerous publications on dinosaurs. He was one of the first to work with T. rex bone pathologies, has worked to uncover sexual dimorphism in the chevron length of T. rex, and argues that several juvenile T. rex skeletons actually represent a distinct genus, Nanotyrannus. Larson, along with paleontologist Kenneth Carpenter, edited the scholarly text Tyrannosaurus Rex, the Tyrant King.

Larson and his ex-wife Kristin Donnan wrote the book, Rex Appeal, about the U.S. Government taking possession of "Sue" following its excavation. The pair also wrote Bones Rock!, a children's book about the history of paleontology and requirements on how to become a paleontologist.

=== Journal articles ===
- Larson, P and Frey, E. "Sexual Dimorphism in the Abundant Upper Cretaceous Theropod, T. rex." Journal of Vertebrate Paleontology 12, Abstract 96, 3 September 1992.
- DePalma, R. A.; Burnham, D. A.; Martin, L. D.; Rothschild, B. M.; Larson, P. L. (2013). "Physical evidence of predatory behavior in Tyrannosaurus rex". Proceedings of the National Academy of Sciences. 110 (31): 12560–12564. Bibcode:2013PNAS..11012560D. doi:10.1073/pnas.1216534110. PMC 3732924. PMID 23858435.

=== Books ===
- Larson, P. and Donnan, K. Rex Appeal. Montpelier, VT: Invisible Cities Press, 2002.
- Larson, P. and Carpenter, K. Tyrannosaurus Rex, the Tyrant King (Life of the Past). Indiana University Press, 2008.
- Larson, Peter; Donnan, Kristin (2004). Bones rock! Everything you need to know to become a paleontologist. Montpelier, Vt.: Invisible Cities Press. ISBN 193122935X.

== Legacy ==
Larson has developed a controversial standing in his field as the majority of academic paleontologists object to any organization's commercial selling of fossils of significant scientific import.

The benefits and drawbacks of selling fossils has been a topic for more than 100 years between academic and professional paleontologists throughout the 20th century. Collaborative work created the primary collections that introduced the public to dinosaurs, but also introduced the idea of fiscal value to resources that fall into the public domain. Academics who reject the practice claim that the high prices that fossils like "Sue" bring into the marketplace prevent public institutions from competing, as private landowners see their fossils as "crops" and are less likely to donate them.

Larson has gained some supporters in academia. Robert Bakker, Curator of Paleontology for the Houston Museum of Natural Science, described Larson in 1996 as a responsible paleontologist.

Others have highlighted Larson's contributions to science. He has published multiple scientific papers about dinosaurs and has contributed to community outreach programs, such as teaching inmates about paleontology while serving his two-year prison sentence in Federal prison. Multiple fossils of high scientific value which Larson's company, the Black Hills Institute, took part in excavating have ended up in museums, such as Stan, Sue, and the Dueling Dinosaurs.

=== Society of Vertebrate Paleontologists ===
The Society of Vertebrate Paleontology (SVP) wrote a formal letter to United States Attorney Kevin Schieffer, endorsing the Federal government's raid of Larson's company, the Black Hills Institute, and seizure of "Sue". At the time, Robert Hunt Jr. of the University of Nebraska–Lincoln, secretary-treasurer of the SVP, stated that "America's national heritage of fossils is being bled away by commercial operations, which should be stopped."
