= Dueling Dinosaurs =

Specimen of Nanotyrannus and Triceratops

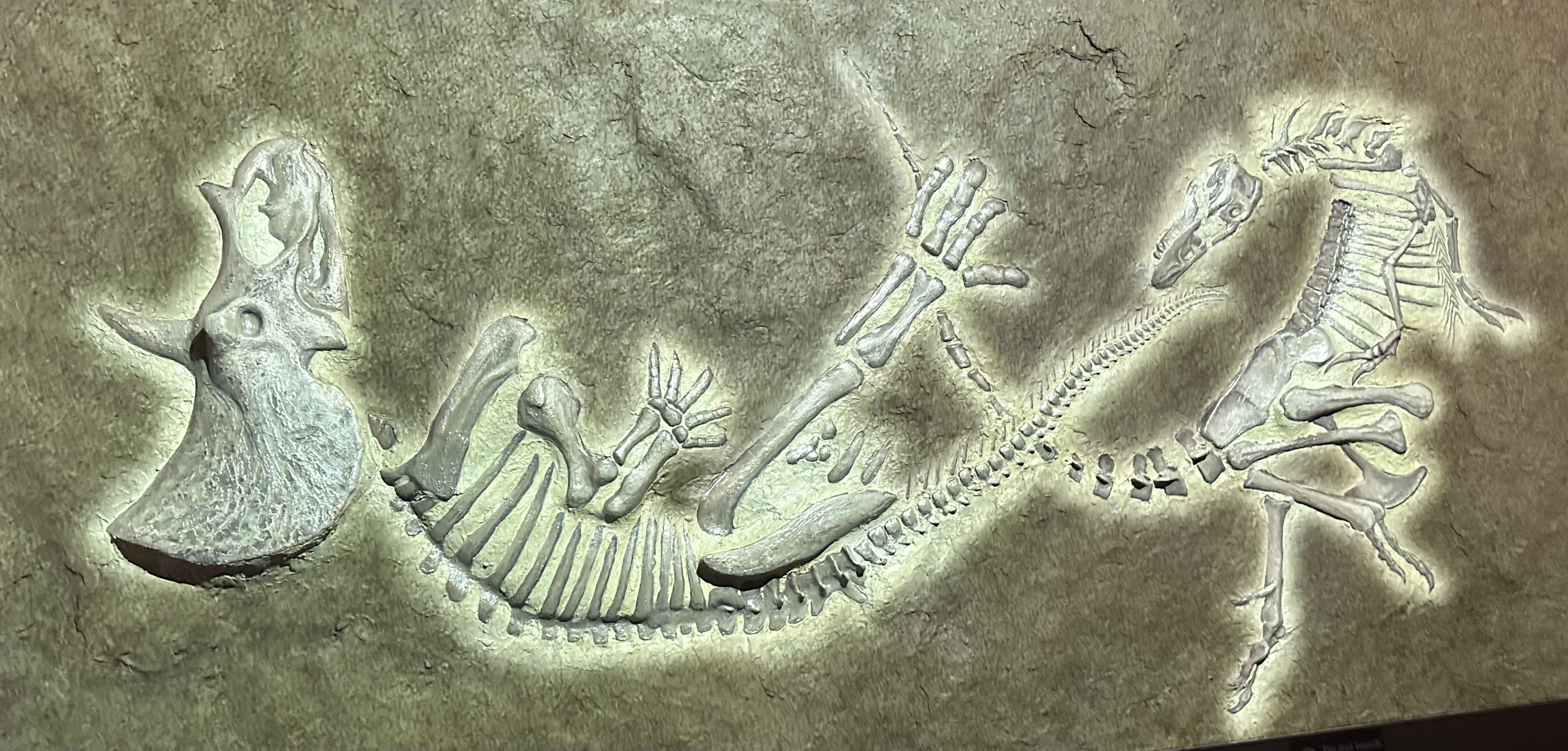
Idealized reconstruction of the specimens in their in situ poses at the North Carolina Museum of Natural Sciences. The actual specimens had to be taken apart to be transported, and are thus no longer in the same pose as they were found.

The Dueling Dinosaurs are a fossil specimen originating from the Hell Creek Formation of Montana, United States, discovered in 2006. It consists of the articulated skeletons of a Nanotyrannus lancensis and Triceratops horridus individual associated in a sandstone block. This fossil remained obscure for years due to a lengthy legal dispute over property rights to the specimen, which has since been resolved as the specimen resides in the North Carolina Museum of Natural Sciences. The "dueling" inference comes from the numerous injuries sustained by both dinosaurs, including a tooth from the tyrannosaur embedded within the Triceratops, although it is not known whether they were actually buried fighting one another. In addition to being an extremely rare paleontological discovery, the Dueling Dinosaurs fossil provides significant insight into the behavior and biology of both species in life.

== Discovery and preparation ==
The Dueling Dinosaurs specimen was discovered in 2006 by ranchers Clayton Phipps, Mark Eatman, and Chad O'Connor in Montana. Two different ranching families, the Seversons and the Murrays, owned the land on which the fossils were found. Phipps enlisted the help of CK Preparations, run by preparator Chris Morrow and paleoartist Katie Busch, to prepare the specimen. Upon first inspection, the two dinosaurs were assumed to have died while locked in combat, but subsequent analyses have suggested that the preserved postures might have formed as a result of the burial process.

== Legal ownership and auction ==
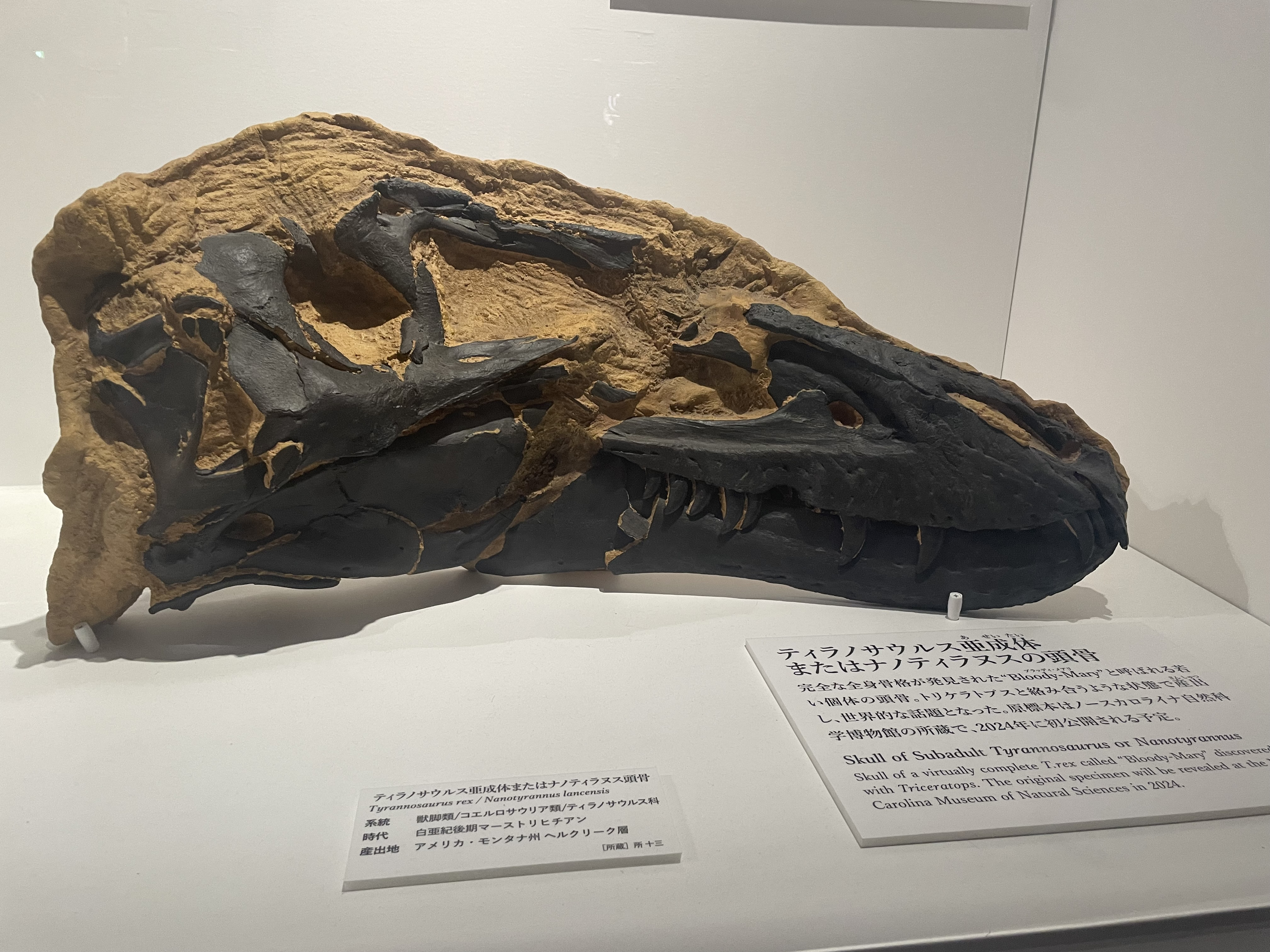
Cast of the "Bloody Mary" skull

The Dueling Dinosaurs remained obscure until 2011, when a marketing campaign, including a dedicated website, was launched by the ranchers (with the assistance of commercial paleontologist Pete Larson) to sell them to a prospective buyer. The ranchers unsuccessfully tried to sell the fossil to several museums, including the Smithsonian and the Museum of the Rockies. With no buyers, the fossils were slated to be sold to a private collector instead. In 2013, Larson presented a poster about the tyrannosaur (also known by its nicknames "Bloody Mary" and "Manteo", specimen number NCSM 40000, formerly BHI 6437) at the annual Society of Vertebrate Paleontology meeting, pronouncing it as a potential specimen of the debated tyrannosaur genus "Nanotyrannus". This presentation was met with significant controversy and ethical complaints, due to the opposition surrounding publishing on privately owned specimens. Shortly afterwards, the specimens went on sale, including auctioning at Bonhams, but no purchase was made.

In 2016, Lindsay Zanno of the North Carolina Museum of Natural Sciences reached out to Phipps, starting negotiations to purchase the fossil, with funds being raised through the private nonprofit Friends of the North Carolina Museum of Natural Sciences. However, legal issues over the rightful ownership of the fossils slowed these negotiations: the Seversons had most of the control over mineral rights on Murray land, and whether fossils could be considered minerals (in which case the Seversons would have rights to it) was disputed. Although a previous court had ruled in favor of the Murrays, in November 2018 judges ruled in favor of the Seversons and that fossils could legally be considered minerals in Montana, angering many paleontologists. However, the case was appealed to the Montana Supreme Court in 2020, who ruled that fossils could not be considered minerals, allowing for the Museum of Natural Sciences to acquire the fossils. The resolution to this dispute is significant for all paleontological discoveries as it set a precedent for all fossils unearthed within or outside of Montana.

== Scientific research and analysis ==
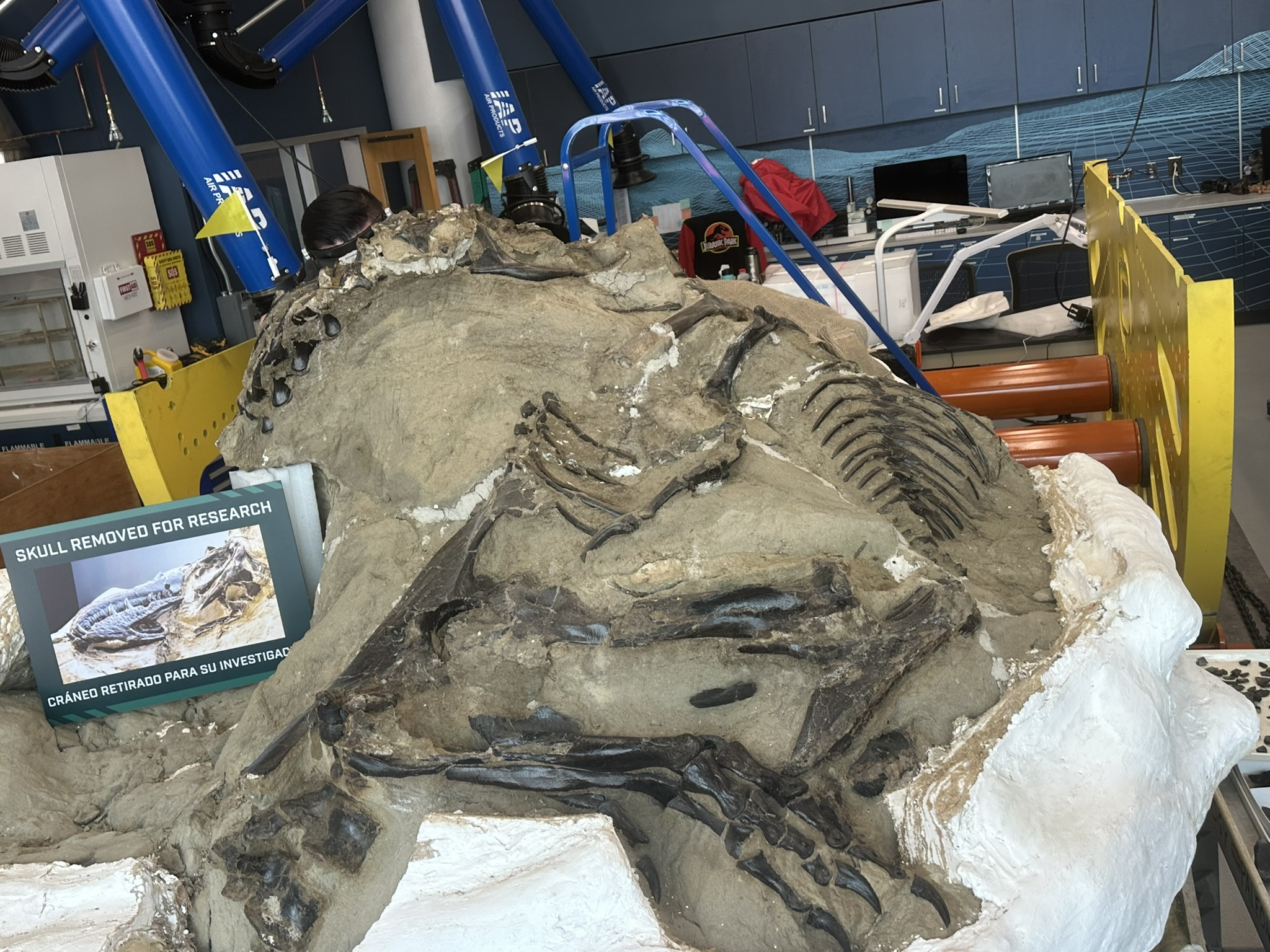
The specimens undergoing preparation at the NCMNS, June 2024

Scientific examination of the Dueling Dinosaurs is currently ongoing at the North Carolina Museum of Natural Sciences. The usage of non-destructive scientific instruments, such as CT scans, is expected to reveal more information on this fossil. The specimen has been considered one of the best-preserved and most complete fossils of both species of Triceratops and Nanotyrannus (the latter being 100% complete), and contains skin impressions, and potentially internal organs, stomach contents, and proteins. In 2025 Lindsay Zanno and James Napoli showed that the "Bloody Mary" tyrannosauroid skeleton was not a juvenile Tyrannosaurus rex as previously assumed, but a fully grown individual, which they assigned to Nanotyrannus lancensis. The researchers determined that the individual was around twenty years old when it died, with fewer vertebrae and more teeth than T. rex. The North Carolina Museum of Natural Sciences accessioned and nicknamed the Nanotyrannus and Triceratops specimens respectively as NCSM 40000 ("Manteo") and NCSM 40001 ("Murphy"), and Roberts et al. (2026) identified their locality of origin as the lower portion of the Hell Creek Formation, dated to approximately 66.897 million years ago.

== Exhibit ==
The specimens were officially revealed to the public in April 2024 after the lengthy legal dispute. The fossil is in the possession of and being studied by the North Carolina Museum of Natural Sciences. The preparation laboratory is open for public viewing to give insight to how fossils are curated, and is the centerpiece of the paleontology wing of the museum.

== Significance ==
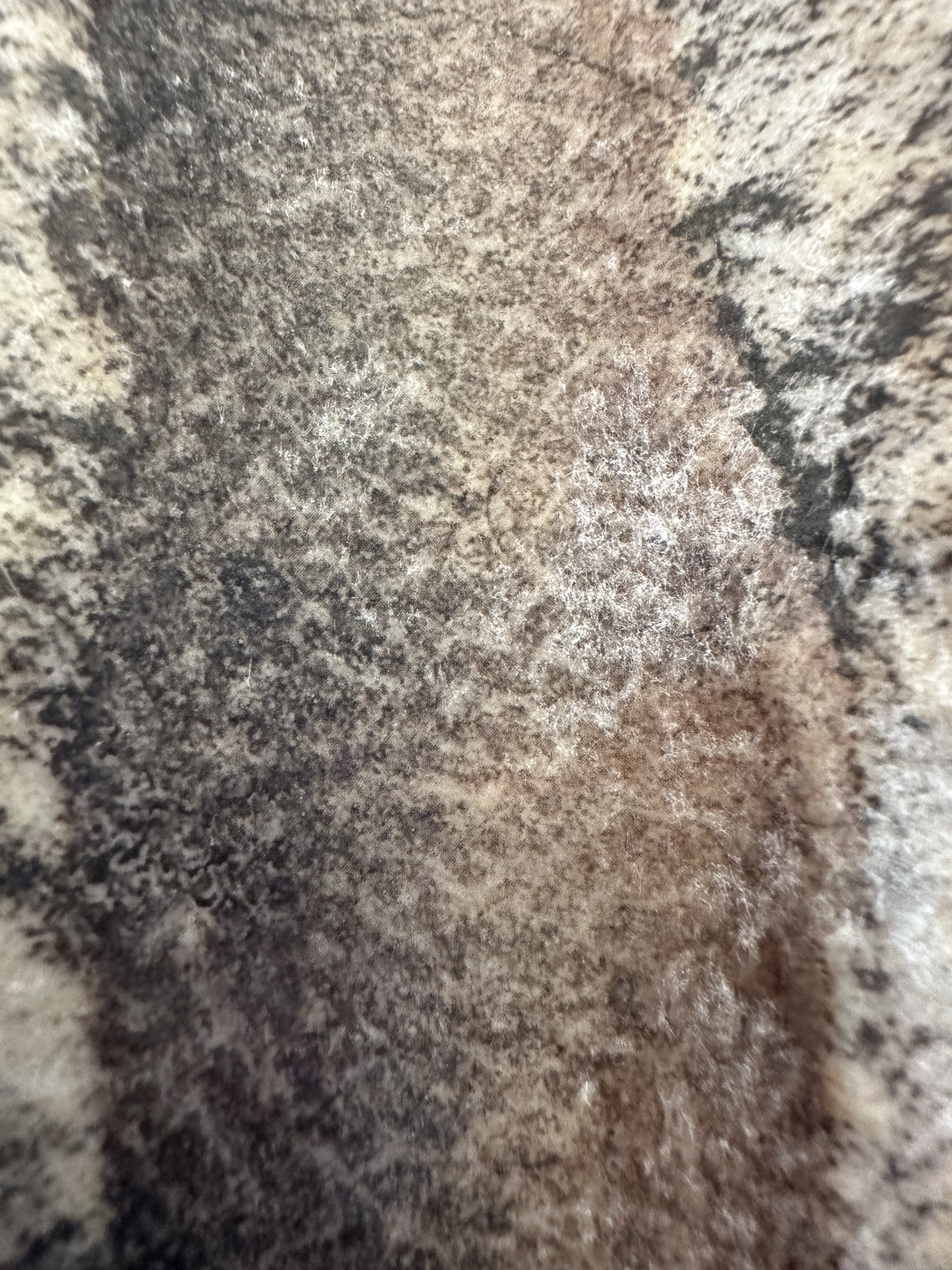
Cast of a skin impression from the foot of the Nanotyrannus

For a long time, paleontologists, artists, and filmmakers have speculated of combat between tyrannosaurs like Tyrannosaurus rex and ceratopsians such as Triceratops. However, direct evidence of this occurring is rare.

The Dueling Dinosaurs fossil is thus highly significant in that it shows irrefutable direct evidence of a violent interaction between a Triceratops and a tyrannosaur (although the prevailing consensus has now distinguished Nanotyrannus from Tyrannosaurus as distinct genera).

The legal battle over the Dueling Dinosaurs fossil is also significant for the paleontological community. It ultimately resulted in legislation that benefits paleontologists and the scientific community. This is especially significant for the state of Montana, which boasts a large abundance of high-quality fossils that will greatly expand paleontological knowledge if the fossils are received by the scientific community rather than private collections.

The Dueling Dinosaurs are considered one of the most significant fossils ever recovered from the Hell Creek Formation due to their high percentage of completeness, exceptional preservation, preserved articulation and potential behavioral significance. The way in which these two species were fossilized provides rare insight into the behaviors of the Nanotyrannus and Triceratops, and constitutes an invaluable window into interaction between the two species.

== See also ==
- Fighting Dinosaurs, another fossil specimen preserving a theropod fighting a ceratopsian, in this case Velociraptor and Protoceratops.
