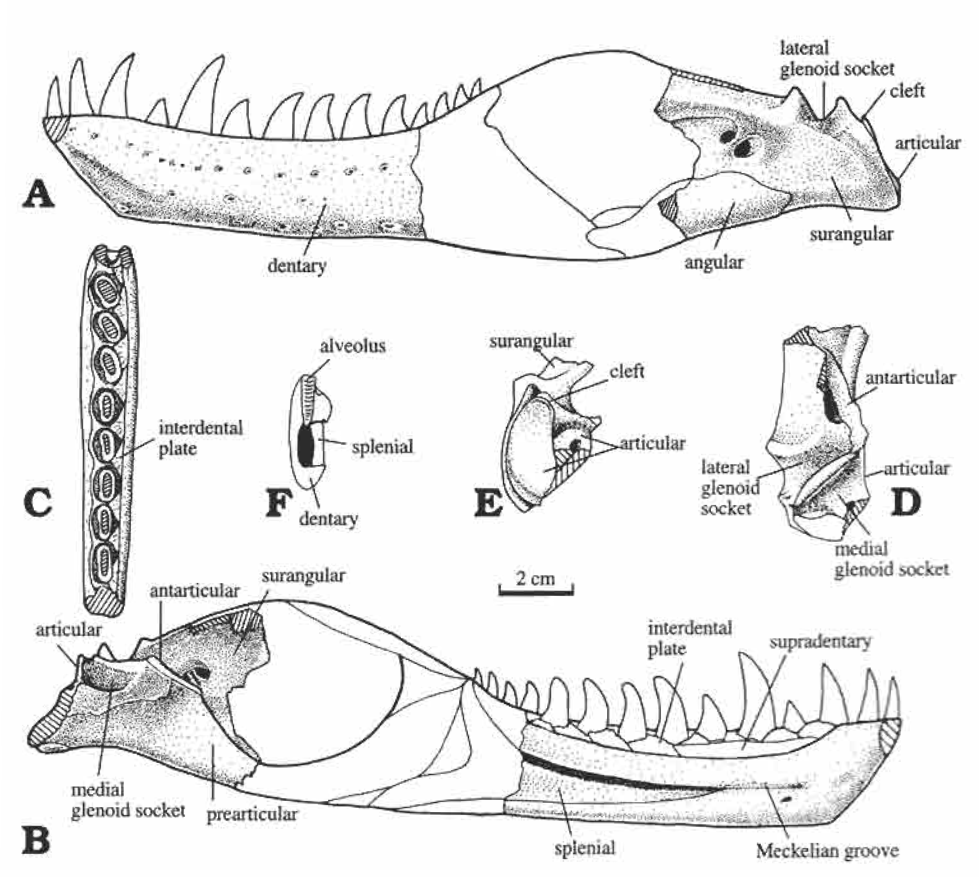
- Lower jaw bones

Scientific classification
- Kingdom: Animalia
- Phylum: Chordata
- Class: Reptilia
- Clade: Dinosauria
- Clade: Saurischia
- Clade: Theropoda
- Superfamily: †Tyrannosauroidea
- Clade: †Pantyrannosauria
- Genus: †Bagaraatan; Osmólska, 1996

Type species
- †Bagaraatan ostromi Osmólska, 1996

= Bagaraatan =

Bagaraatan Temporal range: Late Cretaceous, Maastrichtian

Extinct genus of theropod dinosaurs

Bagaraatan (/'ba-ɣa-raa-tan/ meaning 'small' baɣa + 'carnivorous animal, beast of prey' araatan in Mongolian) is a genus of theropod dinosaur from the Late Cretaceous period of what is now the Nemegt Formation of Mongolia. It may have been a small predatory dinosaur measuring around 3 to 4 metres (9.8 to 13.1 ft) in length.

== History ==
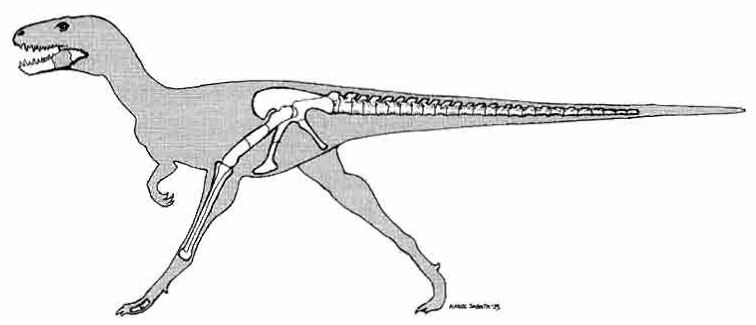
1996 skeletal diagram showing holotype and assigned elements that are now known to belong to a different species

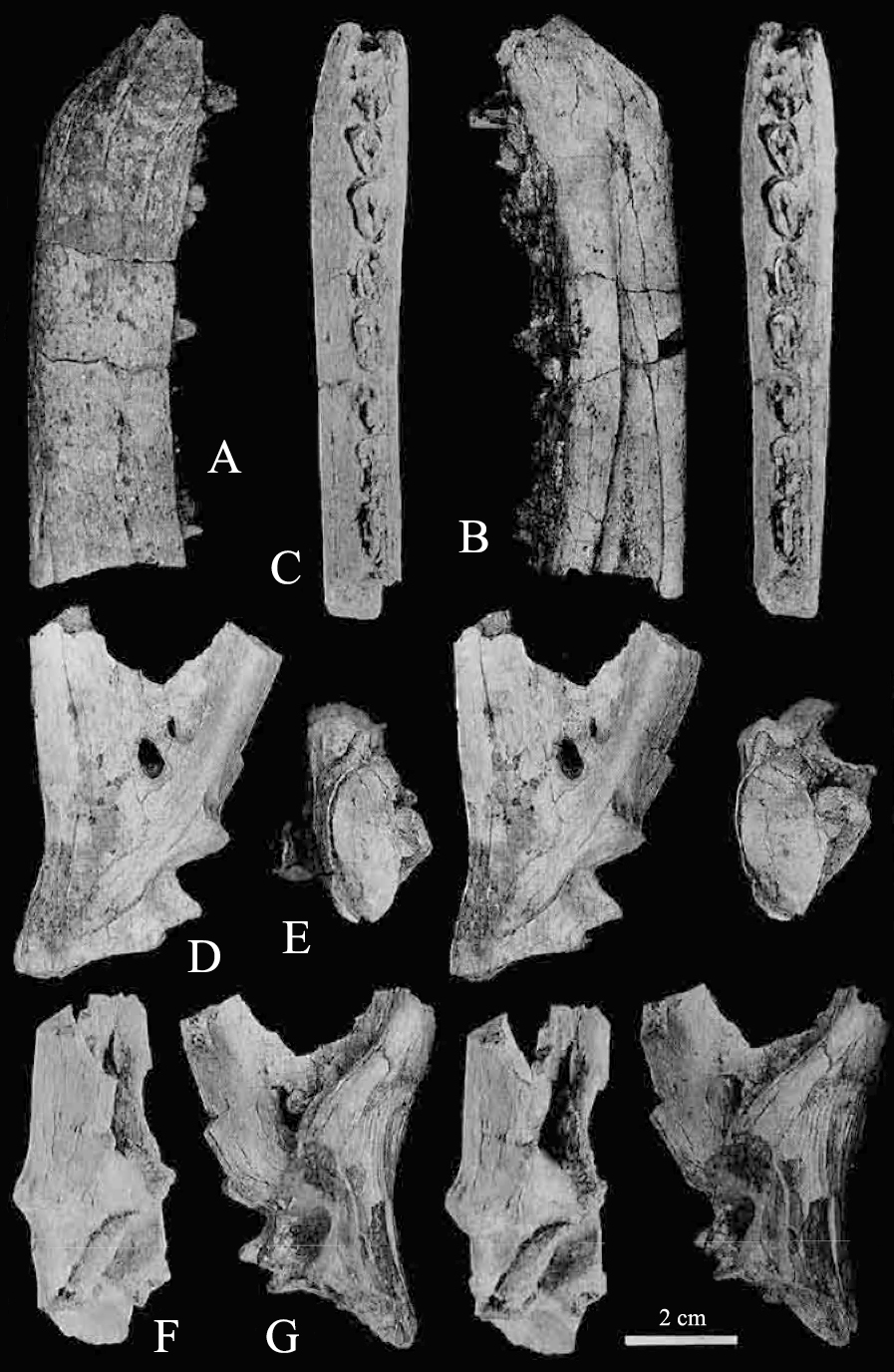
Partial mandible

The type species, B. ostromi, was described by Halszka Osmólska in 1996. Initially, the post-cranial (ZPAL MgD-I/108) skeleton had been described as "bird-like", while the skull was noted to exhibit features of several different theropod groups.

The material that warranted this conclusion was later found to be a chimaera of two non-avian dinosaurs, with some of the post-crania (hand bones, left femur, tibiotarsus, and rib) being referred to an indeterminate caenagnathid, possibly Elmisaurus. The material that is considered the holotype, which includes the mandible, axial skeleton, pelvis, and one pedal phalanx, likely indicates that Bagaraatan is an indeterminate tyrannosaurid. Similarities between the material and young specimens of Tyrannosaurus and Tarbosaurus indicate that the holotype represents a juvenile tyrannosaurid, one of the smallest currently known.

== Classification ==
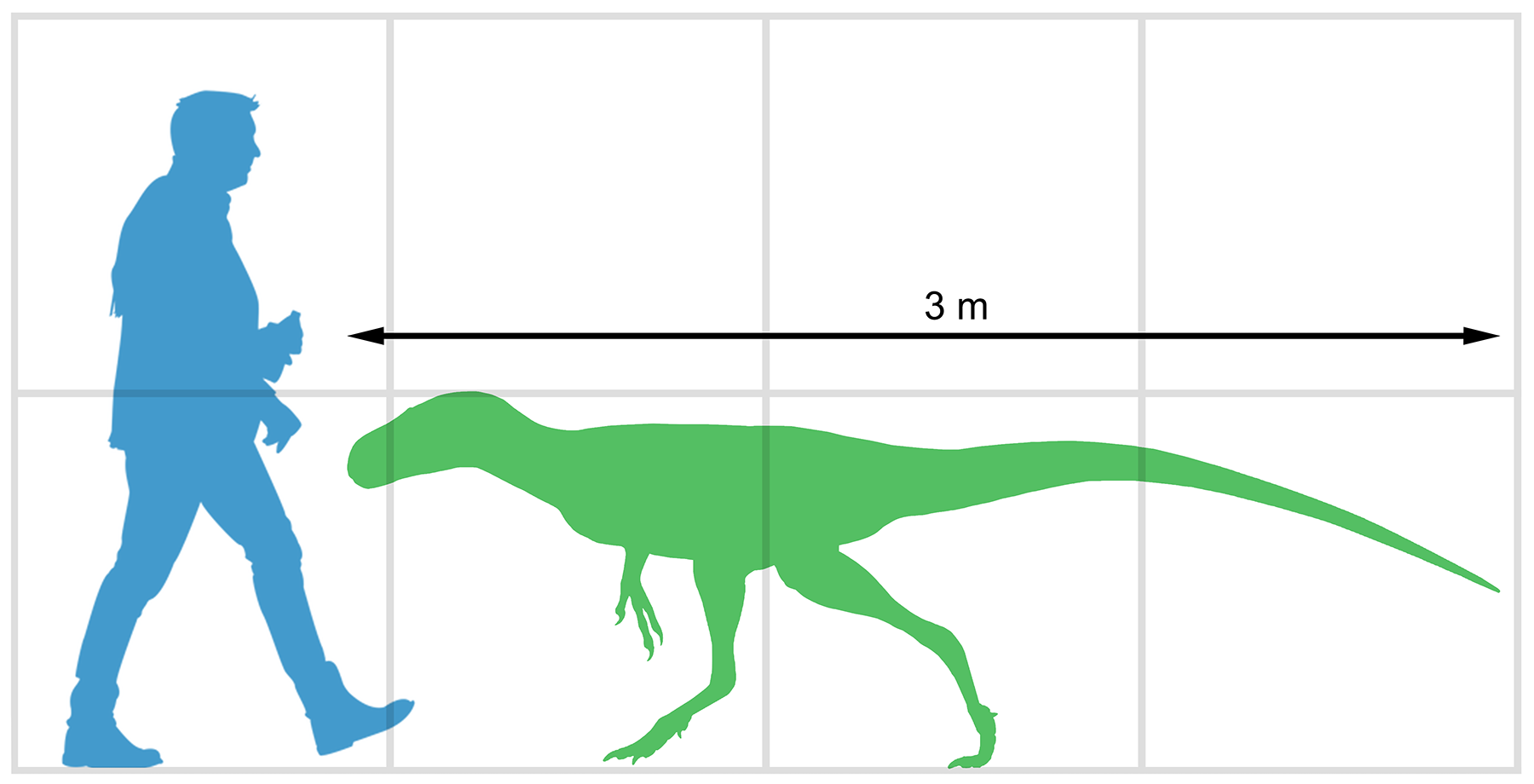
Size compared to a human

Holtz classified Bagaraatan as a basal tyrannosauroid, Coria identified it as a troodontid, and Rauhut placed it in Maniraptora. Mark Loewen et al. placed it in basal Tyrannosauroidea, agreeing with the placement by Holtz.

Below is the cladogram by Loewen et al. in 2013.

- Tyrannosauroidea
  - Proceratosauridae
    - - Proceratosaurus bradleyi
      - Kileskus aristotocus
      - Guanlong wucaii
    - - Sinotyrannus kazuoensis
      - - Juratyrant langhami
        - Stokesosaurus clevelandi
  - - Dilong paradoxus
    - - Eotyrannus lengi
      - - Bagaraatan ostromi
        - - Raptorex kriegsteini
          - - Dryptosaurus aquilunguis
            - - - Alectrosaurus olseni
                - Xiongguanlong baimoensis
              - - Appalachiosaurus montgomeriensis
                - - - Alioramus altai
                    - Alioramus remotus
                  - Tyrannosauridae

In their 2024 reassessment of Bagaraatan, Słowiak, Brusatte & Szczygielski determined that the initial material referred to Bagaraatan is chimaeric. They suggested that the material recognized as the holotype can more confidently be identified as a member of the Tyrannosauridae or a closely related tyrannosauroid. When tested in a phylogenetic analysis, Bagaraatan was recovered in a polytomy with derived tyrannosauroids within the Tyrannosauridae. However, they caution that its exact phylogenetic position remains uncertain since juvenile specimens tend to be recovered in more basal positions than adults of the same species. Their results are shown in the cladogram below:

- - Sinotyrannus
  - Yutyrannus
  - Proceratosaurus
  - Guanlong
  - Kileskus
  - - Suskityrannus
    - - Timurlengia
      - - Xiongguanlong
        - - Dryptosaurus
          - - Raptorex
            - Tyrannosauridae
              - Bagaraatan
              - Bistahieversor
              - Qianzhousaurus
              - Alioramus altai
              - Alioramus remotus
              - Appalachiosaurus
              - Albertosaurinae
              - Tyrannosaurinae

== Sources ==
- Osmolska, H. (1996). "An unusual theropod dinosaur from the Late Cretaceous Nemegt Formation of Mongolia". Acta Palaeontologica Polonica 41; 1-38
