= Newport Seen =

Online magazine from Newport, Rhode Island

Newport Seen, is an online magazine founded in 2009, covering social, cultural and philanthropic events in Newport, Rhode Island. The first issue went online in June 2009. The site claims to have been accessed from 187 countries (Google Analytics).

Coverage of events is online for The Preservation Society of Newport County, The Newport Restoration Foundation, The International Yacht Restoration School, Child & Family Services, Flying Kites and the Redwood Library & Athanaeum.

In 2009, Newport Seen broke national stories on the discovery of the Raptorex fossil, beating the New York Times and National Public Radio with its coverage. It also broke the story of the sale of Vanderbilt Hall in Newport to 12-meter yachtsman and club developer Peter de Savary, later picked up by WJAR TV and The Providence Journal, with attribution.

Principals are Linda Phillips, editor/photojournalist, author of To The Highest Bidder (ISBN 978-0974355603), and Thomas Roskelly, creative partner, branding expert and graphic designer.

Newport Seen was awarded the 2010 "Best Online Website Creation" and the 2010 "Best Online Writing Awards" from the Connecticut Press Club. It was awarded two 2010 national bronze awards in the same categories by the National League of Press Women.
