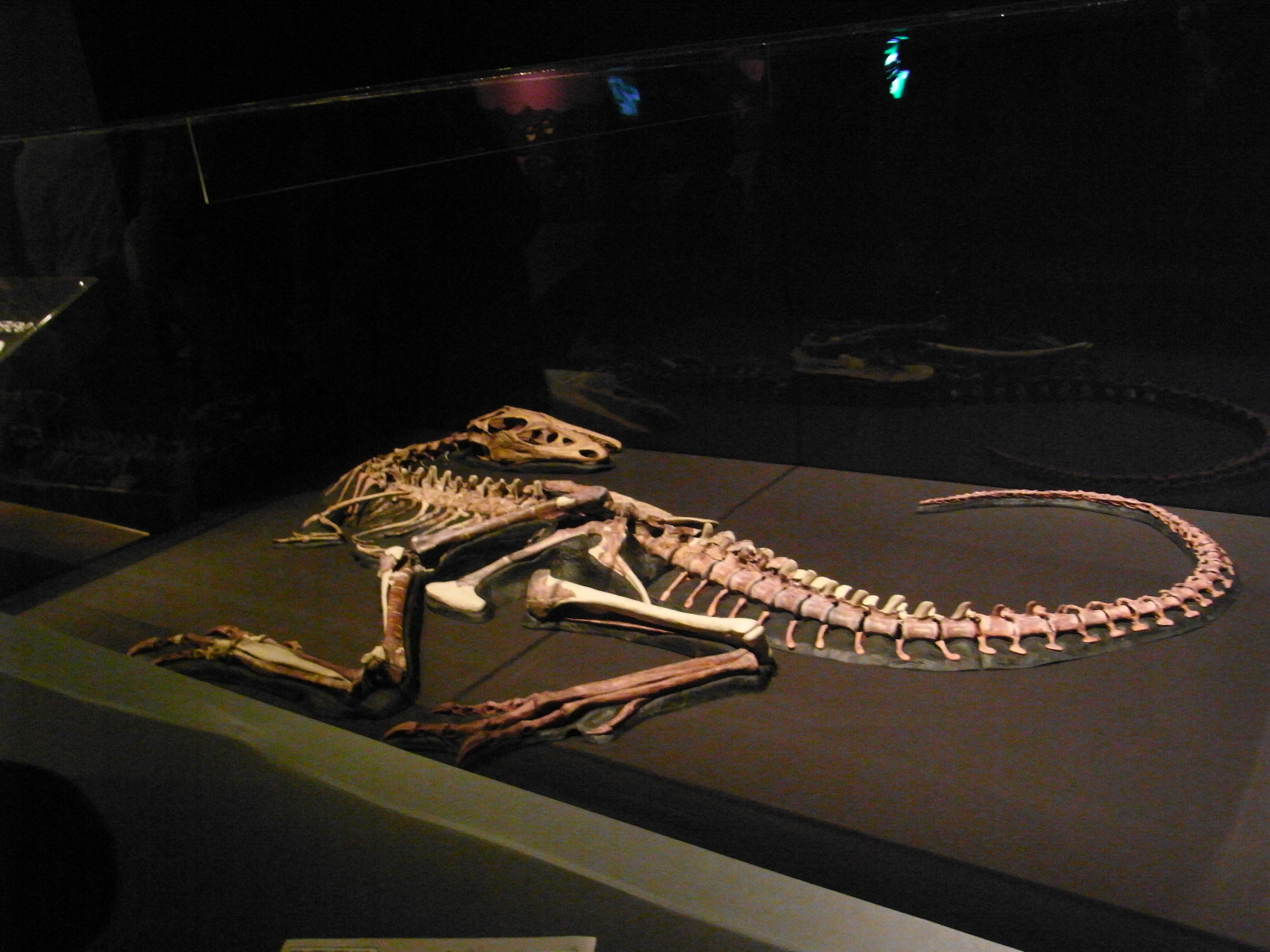
- Holotype skeleton, Tokyo

Scientific classification
- Kingdom: Animalia
- Phylum: Chordata
- Class: Reptilia
- Clade: Dinosauria
- Clade: Saurischia
- Clade: Theropoda
- Superfamily: †Tyrannosauroidea
- Family: †Tyrannosauridae
- Genus: †Raptorex; Sereno et al., 2009
- Species: †R. kriegsteini

Binomial name
- †Raptorex kriegsteini Sereno et al., 2009

Synonyms
- Raptorex kriegstenis Paul, 2010 lapsus calami

= Raptorex =

Raptorex Temporal range: Late Cretaceous, 70 Ma

Extinct genus of dinosaurs

Raptorex is a controversial genus of tyrannosaurid dinosaur. Its fossil remains consist of a single juvenile specimen probably uncovered in Mongolia, or possibly northeastern China. The type species is R. kriegsteini, described in 2009 by Sereno and colleagues. The genus name is derived from Latin raptor, "robber", and rex, "king". The specific name honours Roman Kriegstein, a survivor of the Holocaust, whose son Henry Kriegstein donated the specimen to the University of Chicago for scientific study.

While initially considered to have come from the Yixian Formation of China, dated to approximately 125 million years ago during the early Cretaceous period, later studies showed that such an early date for the fossil is unlikely, and given its extremely close similarity to juvenile tyrannosaurids of the late Cretaceous, it probably came from the Nemegt or similar formation. The specimen is a juvenile and many researchers now consider it to be a nomen dubium because the changes undergone by tyrannosaurids during growth are not yet well understood, so it cannot be confidently paired with an adult skeleton. It is possibly synonymous with Tarbosaurus bataar based on extremely similar juvenile skeletons of the same size and age.

== History ==
=== Initial discovery and research ===
According to Peter Larson, who attempted to re-trace the origins of the specimen, the holotype fossil of Raptorex (currently designated LH PV18 and housed in the collections of the Long Hao Institute of Geology and Paleontology in Hohhot, Inner Mongolia, China) was purchased from a Mongolian fossil dealer by an American businessman in Tokyo, Japan, and subsequently taken to the United States, where it was again put up for sale at the Tucson, Arizona Gem, Mineral and Fossil Show. There it was sold by Hollis Butts to Dr. Henry Kriegstein, an ophthalmologist and fossil collector. Up until this point, the specimen had been identified as a juvenile specimen of Tarbosaurus, which had been collected from Mongolia. Kriegstein notified American paleontologist Paul Sereno of the specimen, who proposed it represented a subadult of a new species from the Yixian Formation of China. Sereno arranged to publish a description of the specimen and to have it sent to China, from where he assumed it had been smuggled.

In Sereno's description of the specimen, he and his co-authors interpreted it as a near-adult aged about six years. Sereno initially stated to the press that numerous index fossils present in the rock slab surrounding the specimen showed it belonged to Early Cretaceous. In an interview with the Chicago Tribune, Sereno said "From sediments, fossil fish bones, turtles, clam shells and other fauna we recovered from the rock matrix alongside the Raptorex fossil, we could generally pinpoint where it had been dug up in an area along the border with Inner Mongolia." However, only a single fish vertebra and a crushed, unidentifiable mollusk shell were actually present alongside the Raptorex specimen. Sereno and colleagues identified the fish vertebra as being similar to the genus Lycoptera, a key index fossil of the early Cretaceous Yixian formation. However, they did not describe the bone or note any features in common with known Lycoptera specimens.

Sereno's interpretation of the specimen as an early, primitive, non-tyrannosaurid tyrannosauroid would have major implications for the evolution of tyrannosaurs. Rather than evolving their distinct anatomy of a large head, long legs and tiny, two-fingered arms only after large body size, a small, early Cretaceous species with similar proportions to adults of true tyrannosaurids would indicate that the characteristic tyrannosaur shape appeared prior to the advent of giant size in the group. This would contradict previous evidence, as all previously known primitive tyrannosaurs had small skulls and long, three-fingered arms, including contemporary species and those that lived later in the Cretaceous than Sereno believed Raptorex to have lived.

=== Controversy and re-interpretation ===
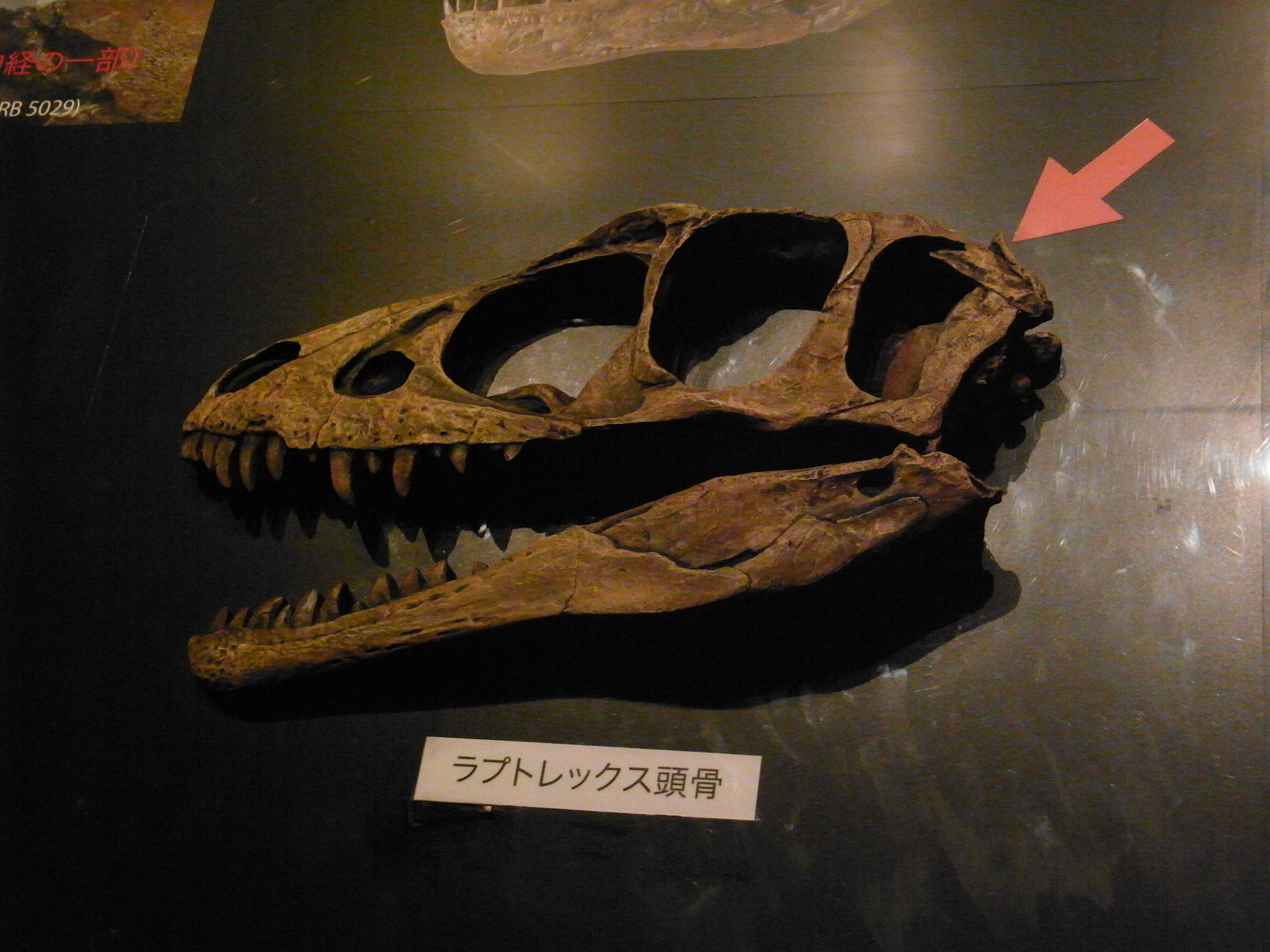
Skull restoration

In October 2010, an online, unreviewed Nature News report challenged the provenance and classification of Raptorex as a basal tyrannosauroid. Peter Larson, president of the Black Hills Institute of Geological Research, Inc., a private fossil excavation and supply company, inspected the fossil and told Nature that he concluded it was a juvenile Tarbosaurus. Because the specimen was donated by a collector without detailed provenance information, Larson doubted the assigned age, which was based only on the Lycoptera vertebra and mollusk shell found alongside the dinosaur fossil. Larson speculated that the fossil could have come from beds in Mongolia that yield fossils of Tarbosaurus, dating from 70 million years ago. He has suggested "a more detailed analysis of the fossil matrix—including dating of any pollen associated with the fossil." Sereno is quoted in the report as standing by his conclusions, noting that definite evidence or a publication had not been produced refuting them.

In June 2011, a more detailed re-study was published in the peer-reviewed journal PLoS ONE by Denver Fowler, Peter Larson and others reanalyzing the published data, which they stated to be equivocal regarding stratigraphic position, and that ontogenetic interpretation in the description had overestimated the maturity of the specimen. While Sereno had claimed that the vertebrae of Raptorex were nearly fused, and that the bone histology of the specimen indicated it was a subadult about six years old, Fowler and colleagues argued that Sereno and his team had misinterpreted the growth stage data, and found that the specimen was actually a young juvenile only about three years old. They also found fault with the Sereno team's interpretation of the specimen's age. Fowler and colleagues showed that the fish bone which Sereno had identified as Lycoptera without comment is actually very different in shape and much larger in size than any known specimen of Lycoptera and cannot even be assigned to the same order as that genus. Rather, it probably belonged to an ellimmichthyiform fish, which span the entire Cretaceous period, rendering the bone useless for dating. In light of this, they noted that there is no reason to believe the fossil dates to the early Cretaceous, and that given its extreme similarity to juvenile tyrannosaurids, a late Cretaceous age is far more likely. Based on this analysis, Fowler and colleagues concluded that Raptorex was much more likely to represent a juvenile tyrannosaurid similar to Tarbosaurus, though its exact identity cannot be known without more information about growth patterns in tyrannosaurids, and further efforts to discover its age. Consequently, Sereno's hypothesis that the derived features of tyrannosaurids evolved in the Early Cretaceous cannot be supported by current evidence.

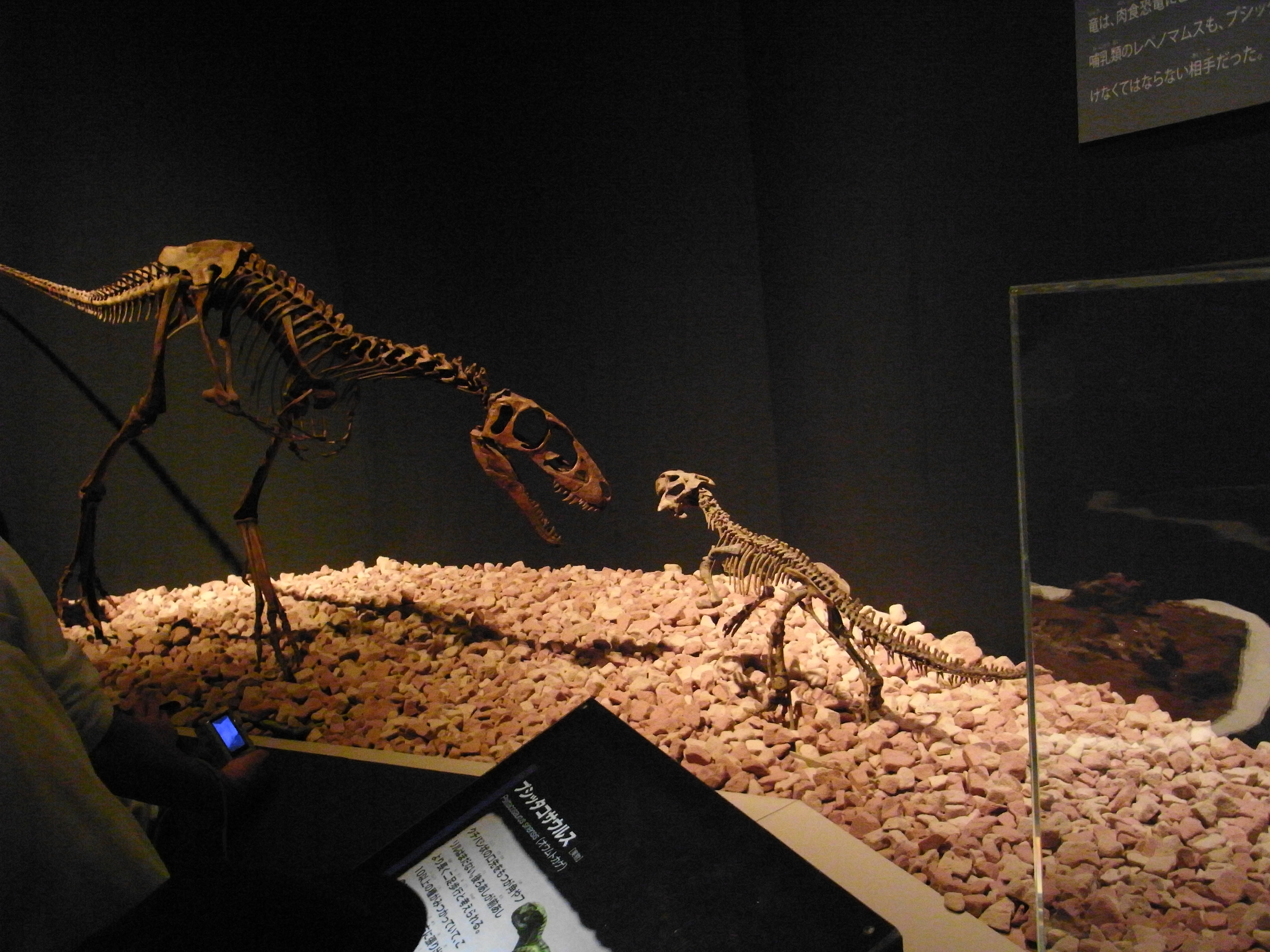
Restored Raptorex and Psittacosaurus skeletons, two species that are now known to have not been contemporaneous

Newbrey et al. (2013) identified the fish vertebra centrum found with the holotype specimen of Raptorex kriegsteini as belonging to a hiodontid, probably representing the same taxon as hiodontid fossils described by the authors from the Late Cretaceous Nemegt Formation of Mongolia. According to Newbrey et al., centra like those of the Nemegt hiodontid are not known from outside the Nemegt Formation; according to the authors, this implies that the vertebra found with the holotype specimen of Raptorex kriegsteini – and by extension the holotype of R. kriegsteini itself – most likely come from the Nemegt Formation and are Late Cretaceous in age. Kim et al. (2022) compared a fish centrum found with the holotype of Raptorex with Harenaichthys lui from the Nemegt Formation and Chinese Xixiaichthys tongxinensis, and interpreted their findings as supporting the conclusion that the holotype of R. kriegsteini comes from the Nemegt Formation.

In 2022, the results of a restudy of the Raptorex specimen were included in an article focusing on the tyrannosauroids of the Iren Dabasu Formation by researcher Thomas Carr. He agreed with Fowler et al. (2011) that the specimen represented a juvenile, but found it to be a valid taxon based on several features of the skull not found in any tyrannosaurid. Additionally, he did not find a subcutaneous flange of the maxilla in Raptorex, which is a unique feature of juvenile Tarbosaurus. In 2026, Raun and colleagues argued that all purported diagnostic features identified by Carr are also present in several juvenile Tarbosaurus specimens, indicating that they cannot be used to distinguish both genera, and thus Raptorex most likely represents a junior synonym of Tarbosaurus.

== Description ==
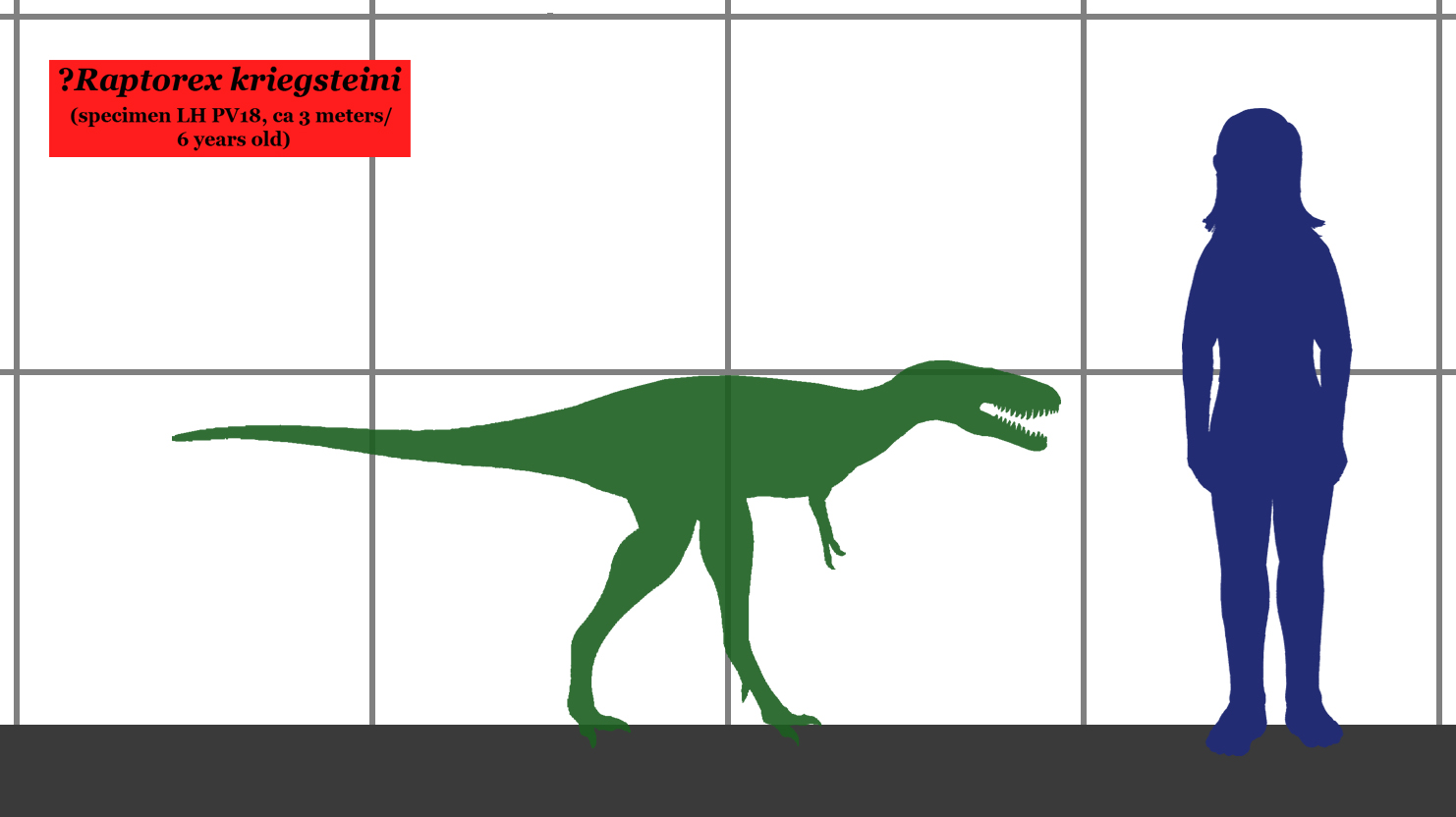
Size of the juvenile specimen compared to a human.

The only known Raptorex specimen shows the same basic proportions as juvenile tyrannosaurids: a comparatively large and solidly-constructed skull, long legs with adaptations for running, and tiny, two-fingered forelimbs. This is in contrast with more basal tyrannosauroids such as Dilong, which retained features characteristic of more basal coelurosaurs such as a small head and long, three-fingered forelimbs.

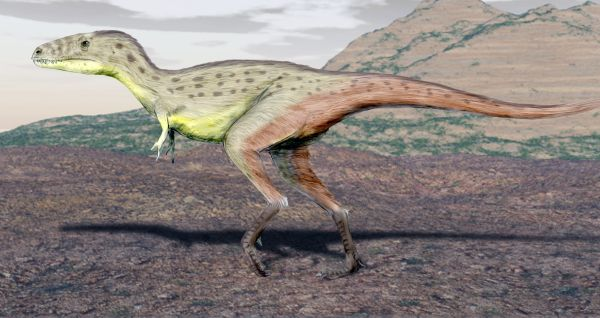
Hypothetical life restoration

The specimen is a very small juvenile, estimated at 3 m (9.8 ft) long and about 65 kg (143 lb). The holotype (LH PV18) measured about 2.5 m (8.2 ft) and died in its third year.

== Classification ==
Raptorex has been interpreted as a tyrannosaurid, tyrannosauroid and a synonym of Tarbosaurus. It is currently placed as a basal tyrannosauroid more derived than Bagaraatan but more basal than Dryptosaurus.

Below is a cladogram placing Raptorex as a basal tyrannosauroid. It was published by Loewen et al. (2013) on PLoS ONE.

- Tyrannosauroidea
  - Proceratosauridae
    - - Proceratosaurus bradleyi
      - Kileskus aristotocus
      - Guanlong wucaii
    - - Sinotyrannus kazuoensis
      - - Juratyrant langhami
        - Stokesosaurus clevelandi
  - - Dilong paradoxus
    - - Eotyrannus lengi
      - - Bagaraatan ostromi
        - - Raptorex kriegsteini
          - - Dryptosaurus aquilunguis
            - - - Alectrosaurus olseni
                - Xiongguanlong baimoensis
              - - Appalachiosaurus montgomeriensis
                - - - Alioramus altai
                    - Alioramus remotus
                  - Tyrannosauridae

Carr (2022) considered Raptorex to be closely related to derived tyrannosaurines, because it and a juvenile tyrannosaurid from the Iren Dabasu Formation shared unique characteristics with juvenile Tyrannosaurus and adult Tarbosaurus.

== See also ==
- Timeline of tyrannosaur research
