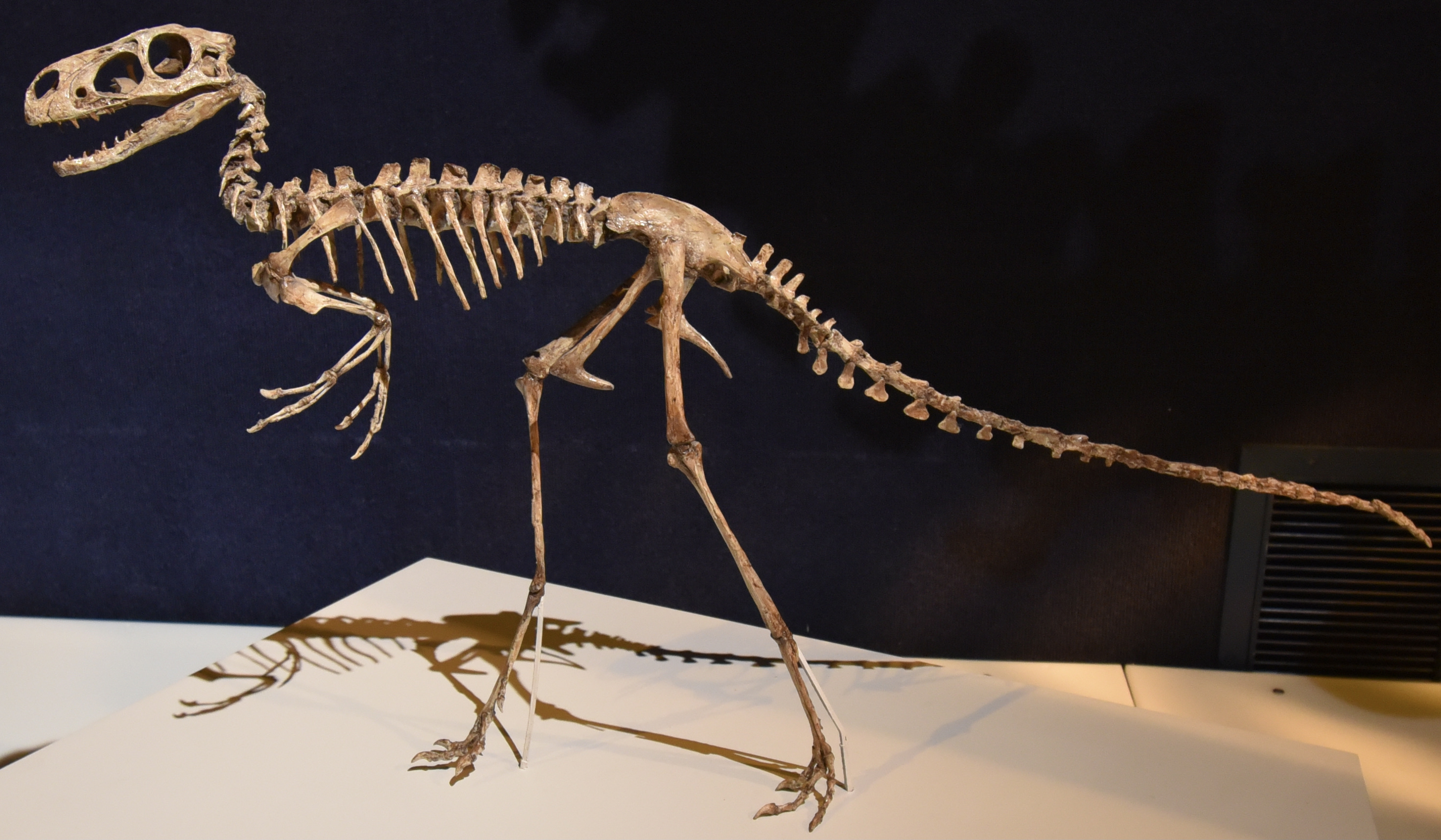
- Skeleton cast mount at Milwaukee Public Museum

Scientific classification
- Kingdom: Animalia
- Phylum: Chordata
- Class: Reptilia
- Clade: Dinosauria
- Clade: Saurischia
- Clade: Theropoda
- Superfamily: †Tyrannosauroidea
- Clade: †Pantyrannosauria
- Genus: †Dilong; Xu et al., 2004
- Species: †D. paradoxus

Binomial name
- †Dilong paradoxus Xu et al., 2004

= Dilong paradoxus =

Dilong paradoxus Temporal range: Early Cretaceous, 130–122.5 Ma

Extinct species of dinosaur

Dilong (帝龍, which means 'emperor dragon') is a genus of small basal tyrannosauroid dinosaurs. The only species in the genus is Dilong paradoxus, known from the Lower Cretaceous Yixian Formation of East Asia (in what is now China). The discovery of Dilong was significant as it provided the first evidence of feathers in tyrannosaurs, something which had previously been suspected for the group.

== Discovery ==
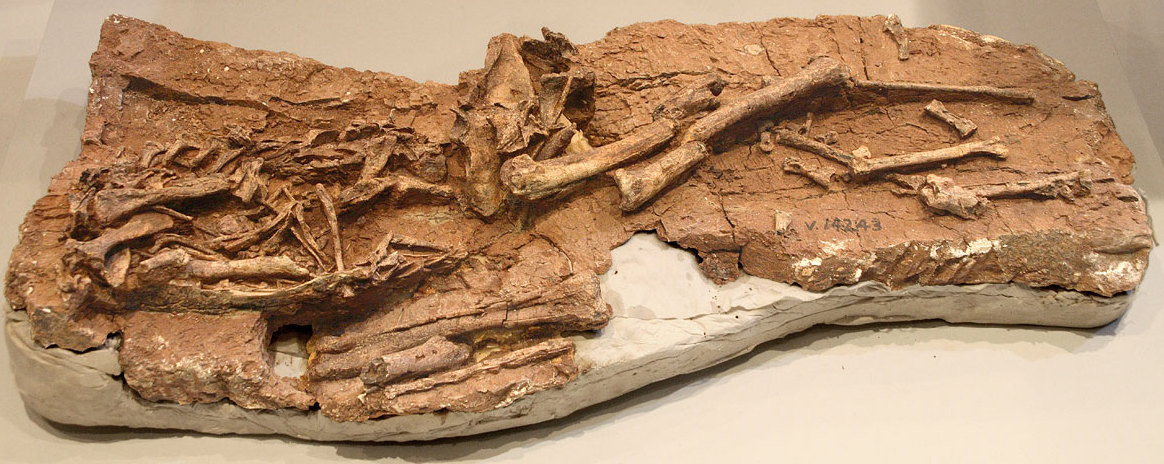
Holotype skull and skeleton

The Dilong holotype specimen was found in the Lujiatun Unit of the Yixian Formation near Lujiatun, Beipiao, in western Liaoning Province, China. This formation contains rocks dating to between 125.8–126 million years old. However, specimens have been found in other areas of the Yixian Formation which may vary in age.

Dilong was described by Xu Xing and colleagues in 2004. The name is derived from the Chinese 帝 dì meaning 'emperor' and 龙 / 龍 lóng meaning 'dragon'. "Di", "emperor", refers to the relationship of this animal to Tyrannosaurus rex, the "king" tyrannosaurid. "Long" is used to name Chinese dinosaurs in much the same way that the ancient Greek -saur is in the West. The specific name, paradoxus, is a Latinisation of the Ancient Greek παράδοξον meaning 'against received wisdom'.

== Description ==
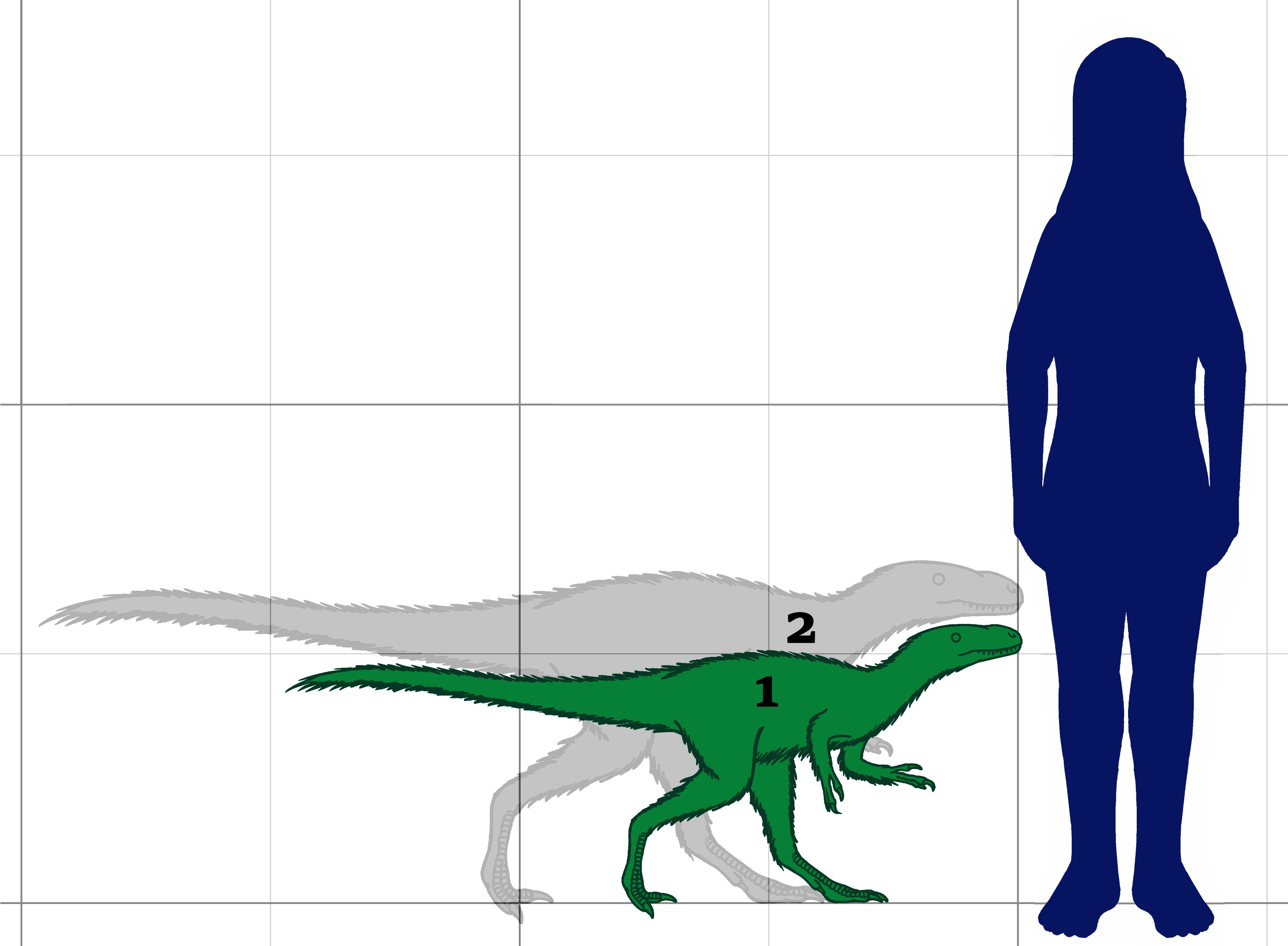
Size comparison between Dilong and a human

The type specimen is IVPP 14243 (Institute of Vertebrate Paleontology and Paleoanthropology in Beijing), a nearly complete, semi-articulated, skull and skeleton. Referred material includes IVPP 1242, a nearly complete skull and presacral vertebrae, TNP01109 (Tianjin Museum of Natural History), a partial skull, and IVPP V11579, another skull which may belong to D. paradoxus, or to a related species. The type specimen of Dilong was about 1.6 m (5 ft 3 in) in length, but it is thought to be a juvenile and may have been over 2 m (6 ft 7 in) long when fully grown. Gregory S. Paul estimated that a 1.3 m (4 ft 3 in) long individual would have weighed 6 kg (13 lb).

=== Feathers ===
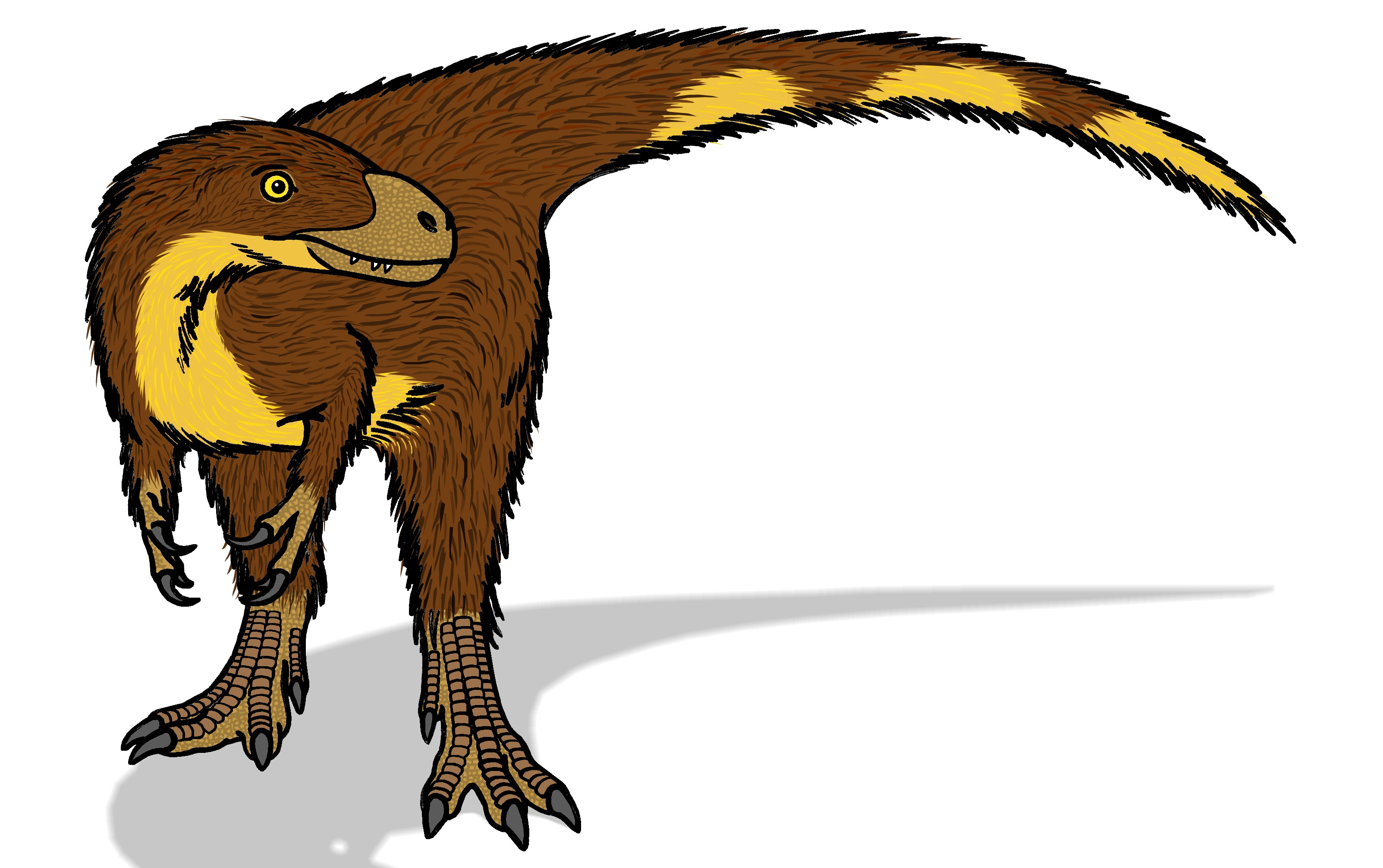
Life restoration

Dilong paradoxus had a covering of simple feathers or protofeathers. The feathers were seen in fossilized skin impressions from near the jaw and tail. They are not identical to modern bird feathers, lacking a central shaft and most likely used for warmth, since they could not have enabled flight. Adult tyrannosaurs, found in Alberta and Mongolia have skin impressions which appear to show the pebbly scales typical of other dinosaurs. Xu et al. (2004) speculated the tyrannosauroids may have had different skin coverings on different parts of their bodies—perhaps mixing scales and feathers. They also speculated that feathers may correlate negatively with body size—that juveniles may have been feathered, then shed the feathers and expressed only scales as the animal became larger and no longer needed insulation to stay warm.

== Classification ==
When Dilong was first described, it was considered one of the earliest and most primitive members of Tyrannosauroidea, the group that includes the later, larger tyrannosaurids such as Tyrannosaurus rex. At least one later study, by Turner and colleagues in 2007, reanalyzed the relationships of coelurosaurian dinosaurs, including Dilong, and found that it was not a tyrannosauroid. Rather, they placed Dilong two steps above the tyrannosauroids in their phylogeny; more advanced than Coelurus, but more primitive than the Compsognathidae. However, other studies continued to find Dilong as a tyrannosauroid, and some (such as Carr & Williamson 2010) found Dilong to fall within Tyrannosauroidea, not among the more advanced coelurosaurs.

Below is a cladogram containing most tyrannosauroids by Loewen et al. in 2013.

- Tyrannosauroidea
  - Proceratosauridae
    - - Proceratosaurus bradleyi
      - Kileskus aristotocus
      - Guanlong wucaii
    - - Sinotyrannus kazuoensis
      - - Juratyrant langhami
        - Stokesosaurus clevelandi
  - - Dilong paradoxus
    - - Eotyrannus lengi
      - - Bagaraatan ostromi
        - - Raptorex kriegsteini
          - - Dryptosaurus aquilunguis
            - - - Alectrosaurus olseni
                - Xiongguanlong baimoensis
              - - Appalachiosaurus montgomeriensis
                - - - Alioramus altai
                    - Alioramus remotus
                  - Tyrannosauridae

In a 2014 study, Dilong was found to be a proceratosaurid. However, in an analysis by Brusatte et al. in 2016, both parsimony and Bayesian phylogenetic analyses placed Dilong outside of Proceratosauridae, as a slightly more advanced tyrannosauroid. In 2024, the describers of Alpkarakush recovered Dilong and proceratosaurids (Proceratosaurus and Guanlong) outside Tyrannosauroidea based on their phylogenetic analysis.

== Paleobiology ==
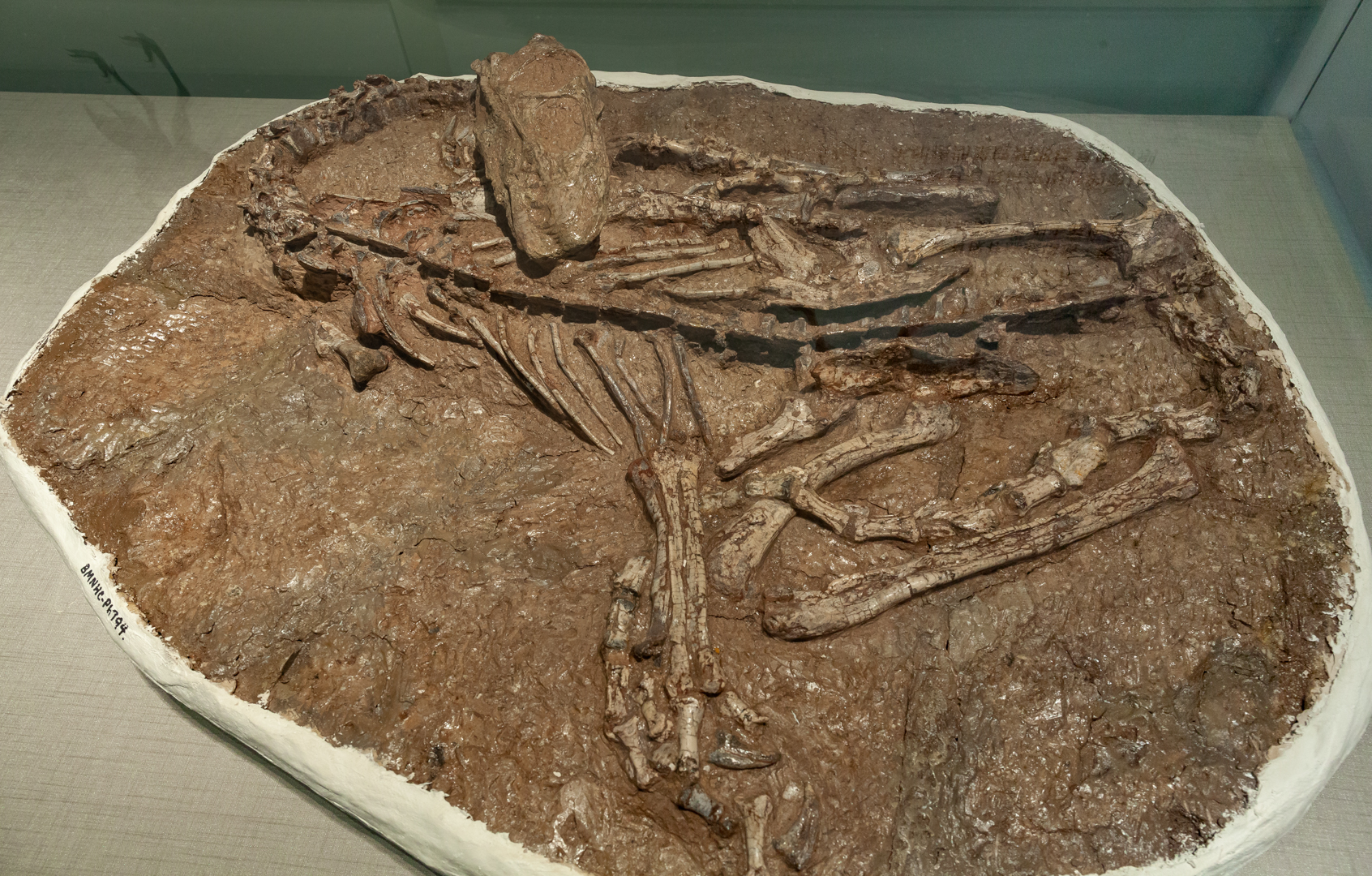
Fossil specimen, National Museum of Natural Science

Braincase scans indicate that Dilong had an S-shaped brain protected by thin meninges, unlike Tyrannosaurus which has a more linear brain protected by thicker meninges; this is probably a size-related trait, as it is in crocodilians. The large flocculus of Dilong suggests it was agile and had good balance, while small olfactory tracts suggest that its sense of smell was not as refined as that of Tyrannosaurus and other more advanced tyrannosauroids.

Dilong is estimated to have had a bite force of 337 N (75.7 lbf) according to a 2023 study comparing the bite force of early-diverging tyrannosauroids to their later and more advanced tyrannosaurid relatives.

== See also ==
- Timeline of tyrannosaur research
