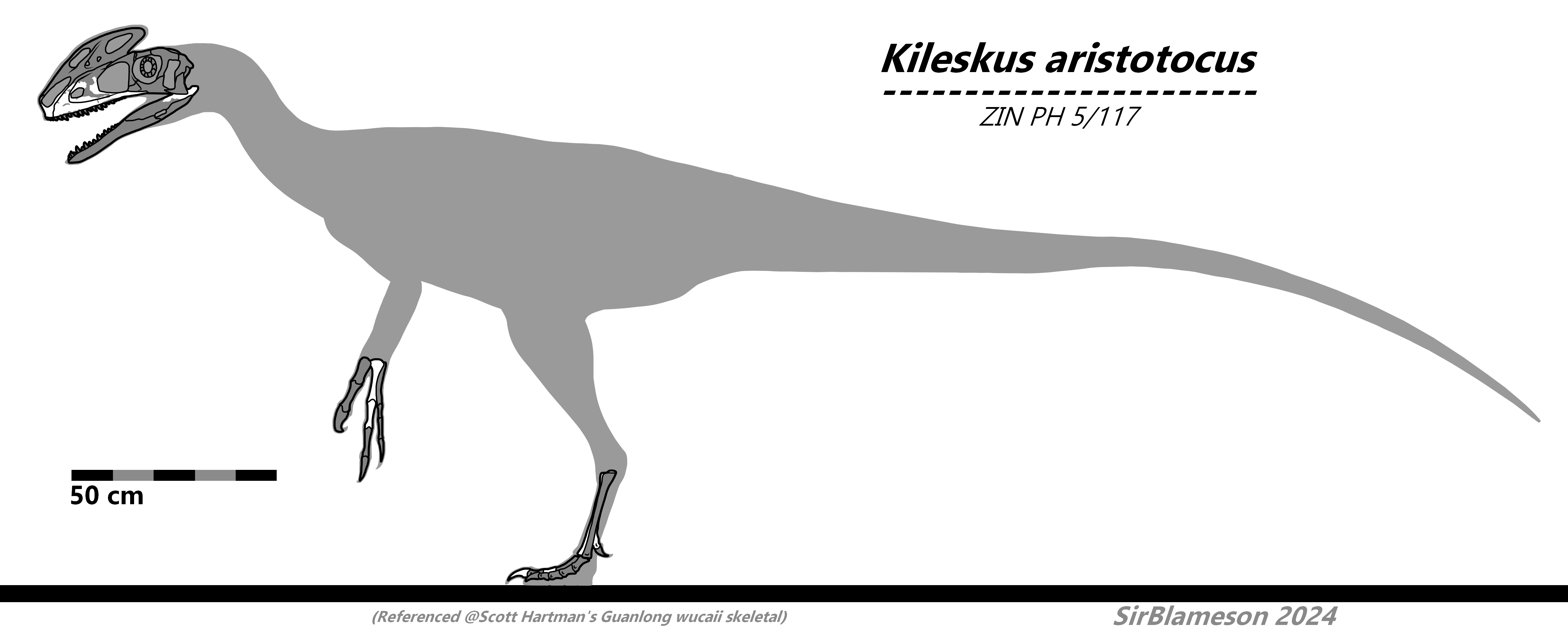
- Diagram showing fossil remains described in initial description

Scientific classification
- Kingdom: Animalia
- Phylum: Chordata
- Class: Reptilia
- Clade: Dinosauria
- Clade: Saurischia
- Clade: Theropoda
- Superfamily: †Tyrannosauroidea
- Family: †Proceratosauridae
- Genus: †Kileskus; Averianov et al., 2010
- Species: †K. aristotocus

Binomial name
- †Kileskus aristotocus Averianov et al., 2010

= Kileskus =

Kileskus Temporal range: Bathonian, 166 Ma

Extinct genus of dinosaurs

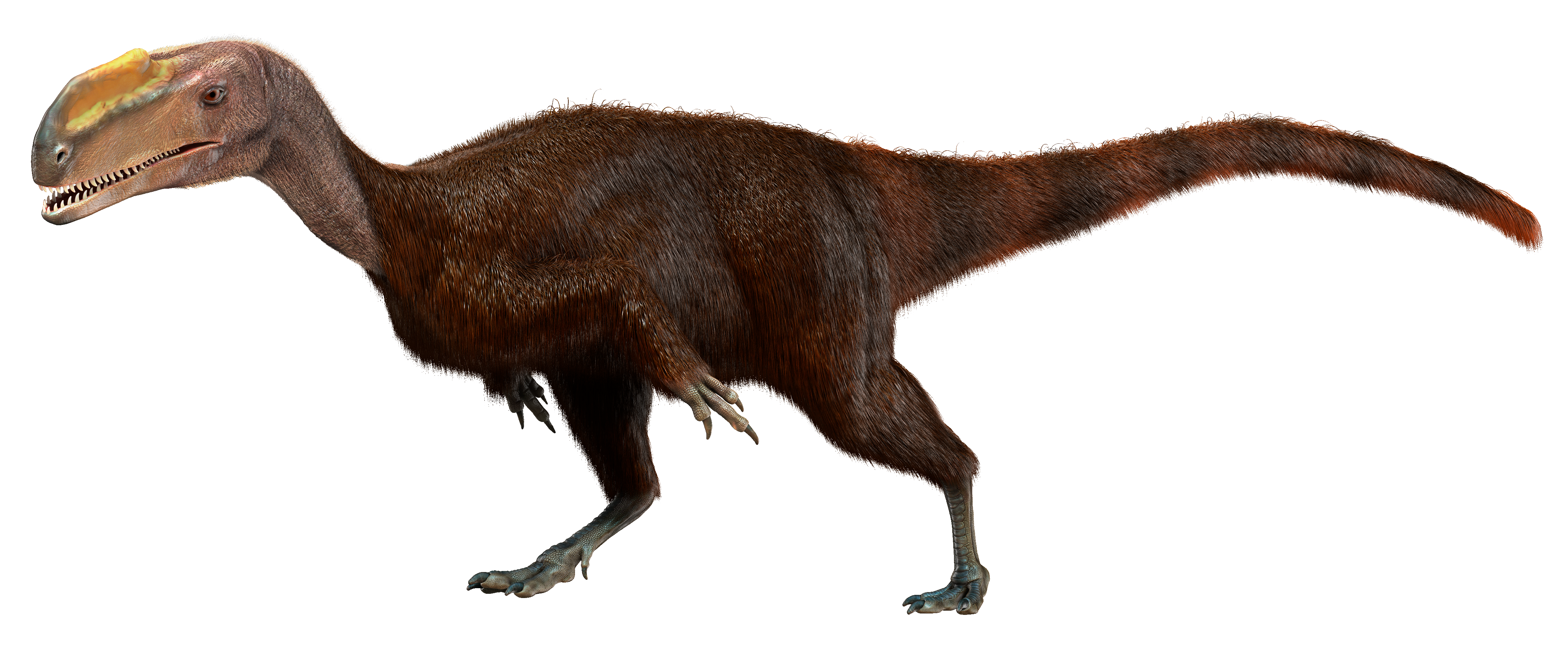
Life restoration

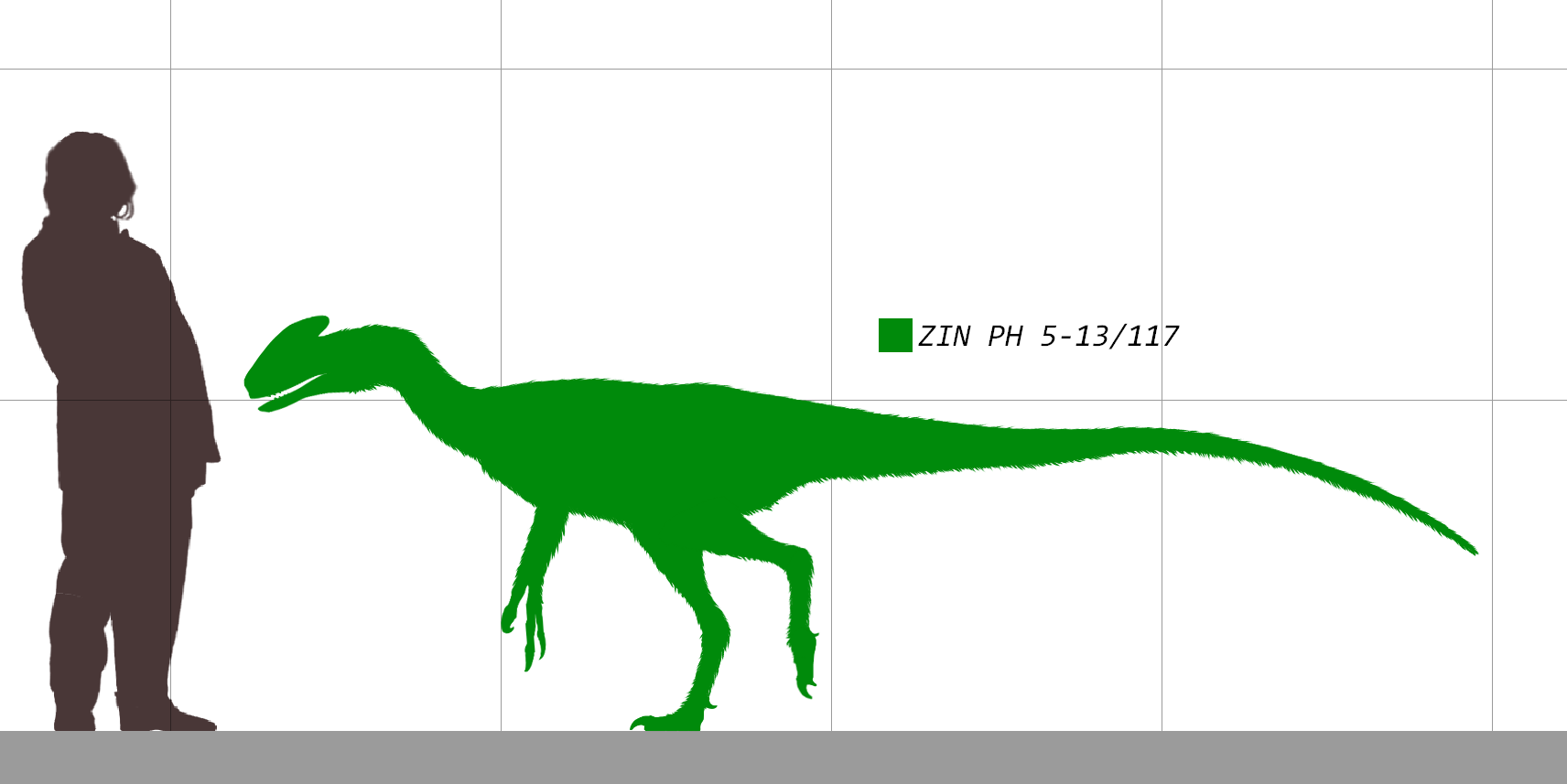
Estimated size of Kileskus compared to a human

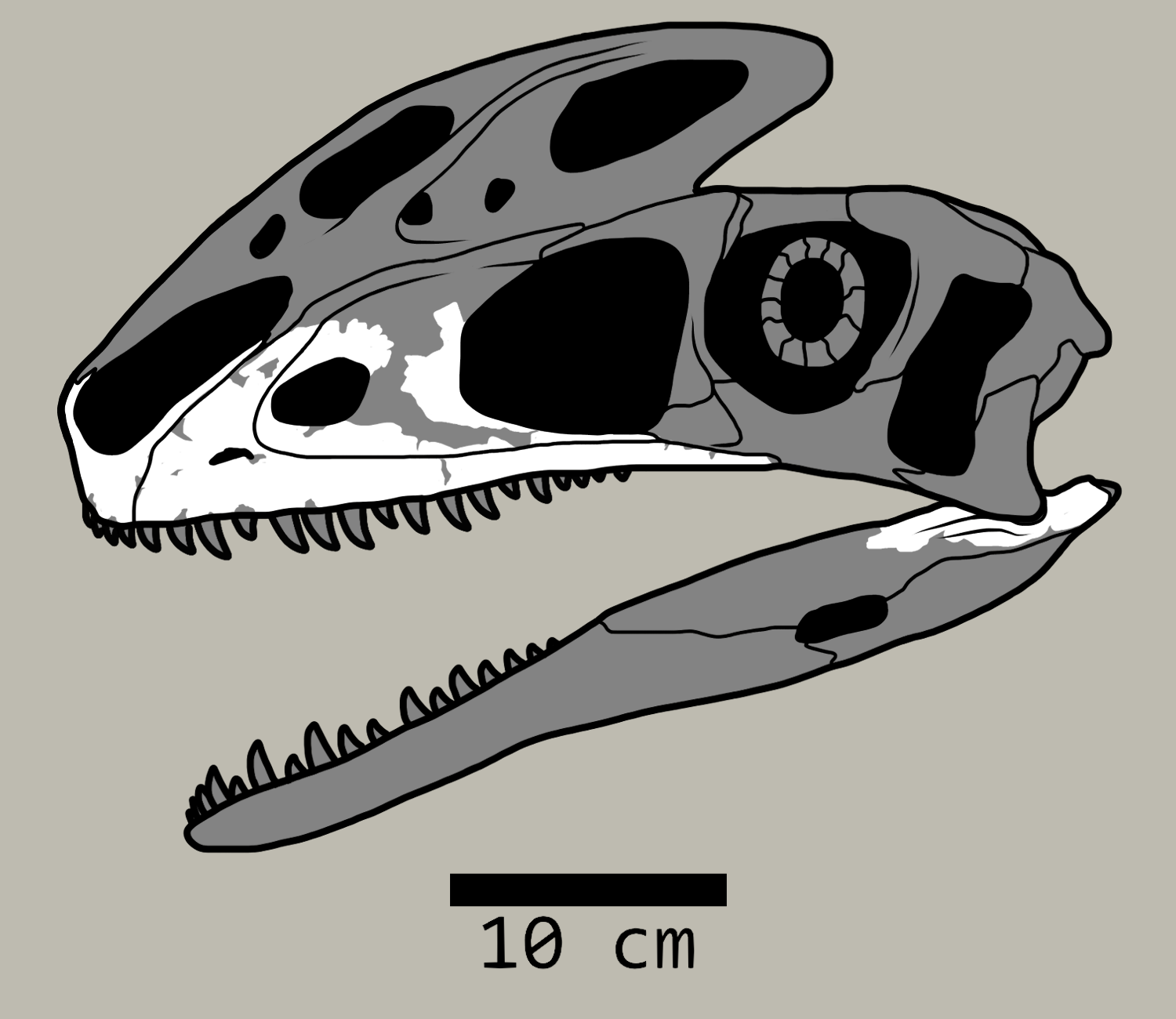
Skull diagram of Kileskus aristotocus. Known material in white

Kileskus (meaning "lizard" in the Khakas language) is a genus of tyrannosauroid dinosaur known from partial remains found in Middle Jurassic (Bathonian stage) Itat Formation of Sharypovsky District, Krasnoyarsk Krai (Russia). Fossils recovered include the holotype maxilla, a premaxilla, a surangular, and a few bones from the hand and foot. Additional remains referred to the genus include cervical and caudal vertebrae, as well as a fibula. The skull bones are similar to those of Proceratosaurus. The type species is K. aristotocus, named in 2010 by Averianov and colleagues.

== Classification ==
Kileskus has been included in two phylogenetic analyses and found to be a basal proceratosaurid both times.

Although it is unknown whether Kileskus sported a nasal crest, it can be assigned to Proceratosauridae due to a number of other features. These include elongated external nares, a short ventral margin of the premaxilla, and the area of the antorbital fossa directly below the antorbital fenestra being deeper than the maxilla directly below it. Kileskus also shares with Proceratosaurus nares inclined posterodorsally at a 40-degree angle to the skull. Kileskus is distinguished from other proceratosaurids by the anterior rim of its maxilla being confluent with the ascending process of the maxilla and gently sloping posterodorsally.

Below is a cladogram published in 2013 by Loewen et al..

- Tyrannosauroidea
  - Proceratosauridae
    - - Proceratosaurus bradleyi
      - Kileskus aristotocus
      - Guanlong wucaii
    - - Sinotyrannus kazuoensis
      - - Juratyrant langhami
        - Stokesosaurus clevelandi
  - - Dilong paradoxus
    - - Eotyrannus lengi
      - - Bagaraatan ostromi
        - - Raptorex kriegsteini
          - - Dryptosaurus aquilunguis
            - - - Alectrosaurus olseni
                - Xiongguanlong baimoensis
              - - Appalachiosaurus montgomeriensis
                - - - Alioramus altai
                    - Alioramus remotus
                  - Tyrannosauridae

== Evolutionary significance ==
Kileskus is arguably an important discovery of the 21st-century palaeontology. As mentioned in Steve Brusatte's book, The Rise and Fall of Dinosaurs , people's understanding of Tyrannosaurus was limited following its discovery in the late Victorian era by Barnum Brown, particularly regarding its sudden emergence to the top of the food chain, dominating the last 20 million years of the Cretaceous period up to the end of the dinosaur timeline. This discovery by Alexander Averianov remained obscure and was not as mainstream as it could be.

For decades following the initial discovery of Tyrannosaurus, the evolutionary origins of the tyrannosauroids remained a major scientific mystery due to a lack of fossil evidence. Kileskus, one of the geologically oldest known tyrannosauroids, lived in the Middle Jurassic (~166 million years ago), 100 million years before the emergence of Tyrannosaurus, providing critical early-stage physical evidence for how tyrannosauroids first evolved.

== See also ==
- 2010 in paleontology
- List of dinosaurs
- Timeline of tyrannosaur research
