= Sinotyrannus =

Sinotyrannus Temporal range: Early Cretaceous, 124 Ma
- Reconstructed skeletal mount, Chaoyang Paleontological Museum

Scientific classification
- Kingdom: Animalia
- Phylum: Chordata
- Class: Reptilia
- Clade: Dinosauria
- Clade: Saurischia
- Clade: Theropoda
- Superfamily: †Tyrannosauroidea
- Family: †Proceratosauridae
- Genus: †Sinotyrannus; Ji et al., 2009

Type species
- †Sinotyrannus kazuoensis Ji et al., 2009

Extinct genus of theropod dinosaurs

Sinotyrannus (meaning "Chinese tyrant") is an extinct genus of large tyrannosauroid theropod dinosaurs known from the Early Cretaceous Jiufotang Formation of Liaoning, China. This genus contains a single species, Sinotyrannus kazuoensis, known from a single mature specimen including a partial skull, some vertebrae, and part of the pelvic girdle.

While it exhibited greater body size that would put it on par with the later tyrannosaurids such as Tyrannosaurus (a group that Sinotyrannus was initially suspected of being in), Sinotyrannus was more likely a member of the family Proceratosauridae, basal within or closely related to tyrannosauroids. This family originated in the Jurassic, and its members are known from Europe and Asia. Sinotyrannus and its coeval relative Yutyrannus appear to have been surprisingly large compared to most of their Early Cretaceous relatives, such as Dilong. Most of the world during the Early Cretaceous was dominated by more basal tetanurans, such as the megalosauroids and allosaurs, with tyrannosaurids themselves only taking over after both groups started to decline. However, Sinotyrannus and Yutyrannus appear to be exceptions to this.

Sinotyrannus was the largest theropod in the Jiufotang Formation, reaching up to 10 metres (33 ft) in length. The smaller theropod Huaxiagnathus from the older Yixian Formation, traditionally regarded as a "compsognathid" and known only from immature specimens, may be an immature form of Sinotyrannus. If this hypothesis is supported, Sinotyrannus would be a junior synonym of Huaxiagnathus.

== Description ==
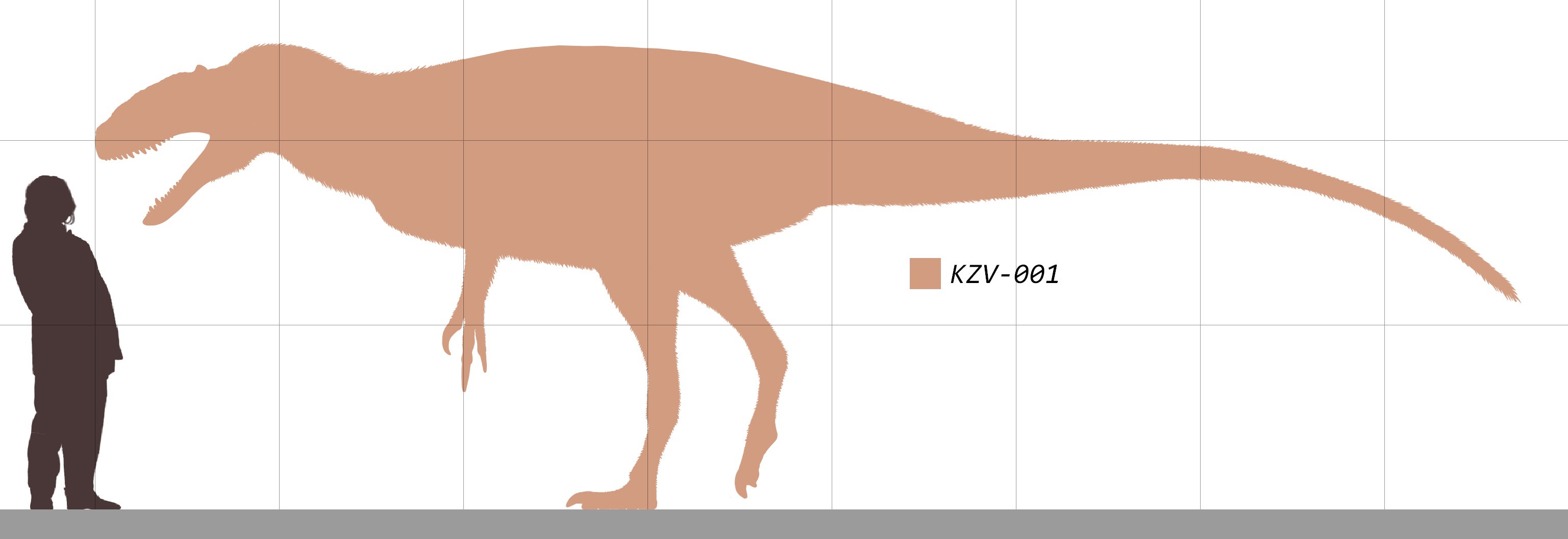
Estimated size of Sinotyrannus compared to a human

Sinotyrannus was a large tyrannosaur, measuring approximately 9–10 metres (30–33 ft) long and weighing 2.5 metric tons (2.8 short tons). It is among the largest basal tyrannosauroids known, repudiating the previously presumed trend that tyrannosauroids gradually increased in size throughout the Cretaceous period from small basal forms like Dilong to advanced apex predators such as Tyrannosaurus. The holotype, KZV-001, consists of a disarticulated partial skeleton including the front portion of the skull, three dorsal vertebrae, incomplete ilia, three articulated manual phalanges (including an ungual), and other fragmentary bones.

Skull reconstruction of S. kazuoensis with known material in white.

The described cranial elements include the premaxillae, dentary, and anterior portions of the maxillae and nasals. The dorsal margin of the maxilla is unusually concave unlike the convex condition in tyrannosaurids. The nares are large and elliptical, supporting its relation to proceratosauridae. The dentary gradually curves upwards as it approaches its front edge. Many teeth are preserved attached to the maxillae, with a roughly equal number of denticles on each side, similarly to those of tyrannosaurids. Sinotyrannus could perceivably have had a tall nasal crest like other proceratosaurids, although not enough of its nasals are preserved to be certain.

The three preserved vertebrae have very tall neural spines. The proportions of the preserved manual phalanges support the idea that they belong to the second finger, and the ungual has a deep groove on each side. The ilia are mainly present as molds, with the mold of the external side of the left ilium being the most complete. The preacetabular blade is short and wide, with a massive pubic peduncle, while the postacetabular blade is longer and thinner, with a triangular ischial peduncle. These traits of the ilia differentiate it from more advanced tyrannosauroids such as the tyrannosaurids.

Sinotyrannus was likely an active predator, as has been speculated for most tyrannosaurs, and may have been covered in a simple feathery coat as was the case with most basal coelurosaurs, including many early tyrannosaurs.

== Classification ==
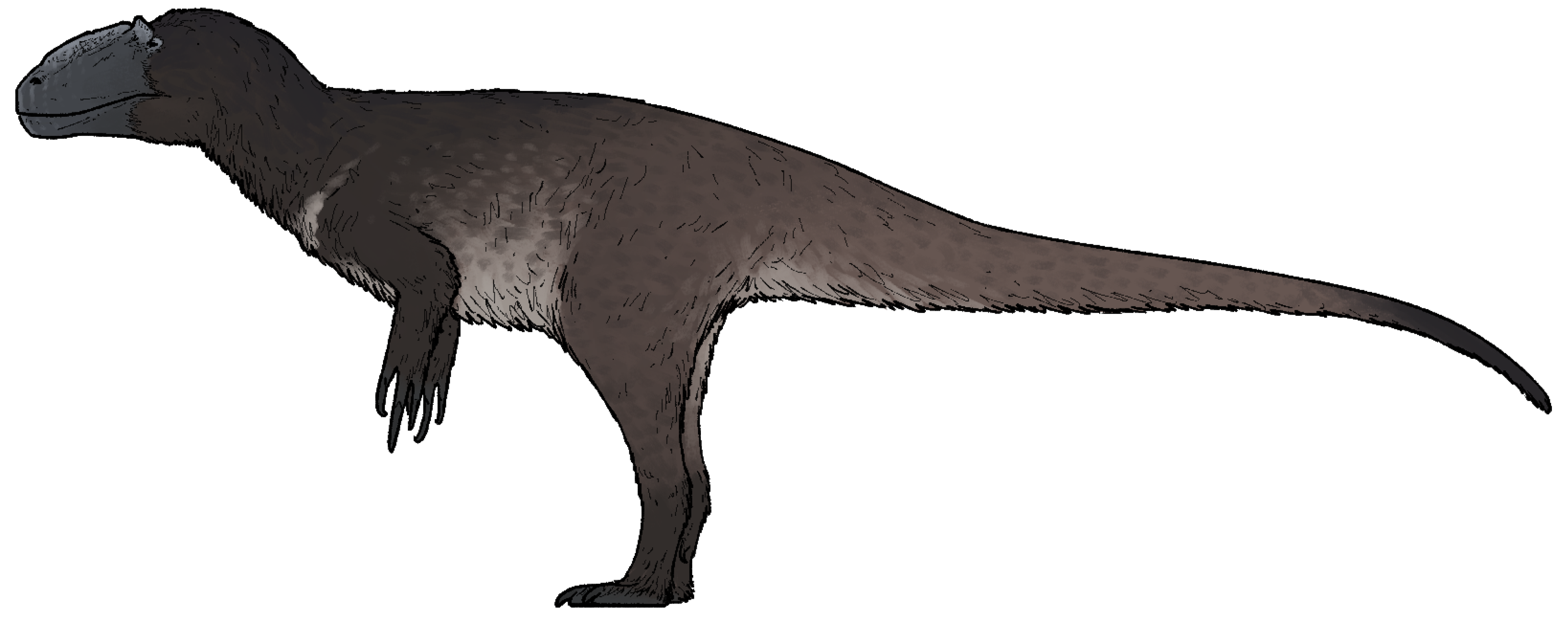
Speculative life restoration

The original description of Sinotyrannus proposed that it could have been the earliest tyrannosaurid due to its large size, but subsequent analyses place it as a proceratosaurid tyrannosauroid. A 2013 study by Loewen and colleagues considered it to be part of a clade containing Juratyrant and Stokesosaurus within the Proceratosauridae, as they all reputedly share a narrow preacetabular notch. The results of their phylogenetic analyses are shown in the cladogram below:

- Tyrannosauroidea
  - Proceratosauridae
    - - Proceratosaurus bradleyi
      - Kileskus aristotocus
      - Guanlong wucaii
    - - Sinotyrannus kazuoensis
      - - Juratyrant langhami
        - Stokesosaurus clevelandi
  - - Dilong paradoxus
    - - Eotyrannus lengi
      - - Bagaraatan ostromi
        - - Raptorex kriegsteini
          - - Dryptosaurus aquilunguis
            - - - Alectrosaurus olseni
                - Xiongguanlong baimoensis
              - - Appalachiosaurus montgomeriensis
                - - - Alioramus altai
                    - Alioramus remotus
                  - Tyrannosauridae

However, Brusatte et al. (2016) instead placed Juratyrant and Stokesosaurus outside of the Proceratosauridae, and proposed that Sinotyrannus represents the sister taxon of Yutyrannus within Proceratosauridae. The results of their phylogenetic analyses are shown in the cladogram below:

- Proceratosauridae
  - Guanlong
  - - Proceratosaurus
    - - Kileskus
      - - Yutyrannus
        - Sinotyrannus

Naish & Cau in 2022 found Sinotyrannus within Proceratosauridae but placed Yutyrannus among the more advanced Tyrannosauroidea.

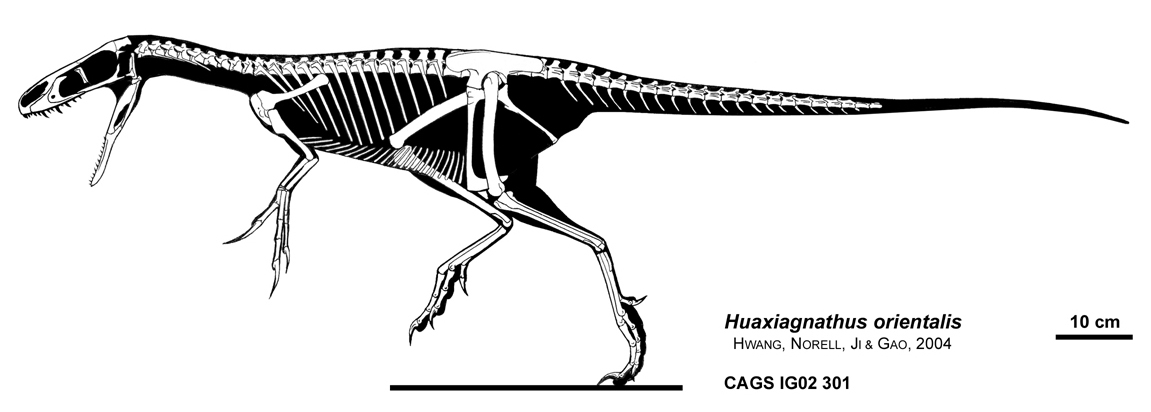
Reconstructed skeleton of Huaxiagnathus, which has been suggested to represent an immature specimen of Sinotyrannus

In 2024, Andrea Cau published a comprehensive theropod phylogenetic framework that could be used to identify immature specimens of other taxa. The following year, Cau and Paterna used an updated version of this dataset to deduce that Sinotyrannus—known from a specimen of an adult individual—was a mature form of the "compsognathid" Huaxiagnathus, which is known only from two immature specimens. Both species share a dorsally convex ilium with a short preacetabular process without an anteroventral hook. Other differences observed between the two species are likely the result of differences in body size and ontogenetic stage, consistent with the more established growth series of other tyrannosauroids like Tyrannosaurus. Since Huaxiagnathus was named before Sinotyrannus, this genus name holds priority, making Sinotyrannus a junior synonym of the former. In their phylogenetic tree, the combined Sinotyrannus+Huaxiagnathus operational taxonomic unit (OTU) was recovered as the sister taxon to Eotyrannus in a clade with other traditional proceratosaurids.

== Paleoenvironment ==
Sinotyrannus lived in a rather wet environment with well-watered forests and large lakes. The area experienced great diversity in terms of vertebrate fauna, with many taxa, such as Microraptor, living alongside Sinotyrannus. Despite this, the area was quite prone to high volcanism.

== See also ==
- Timeline of tyrannosaur research
