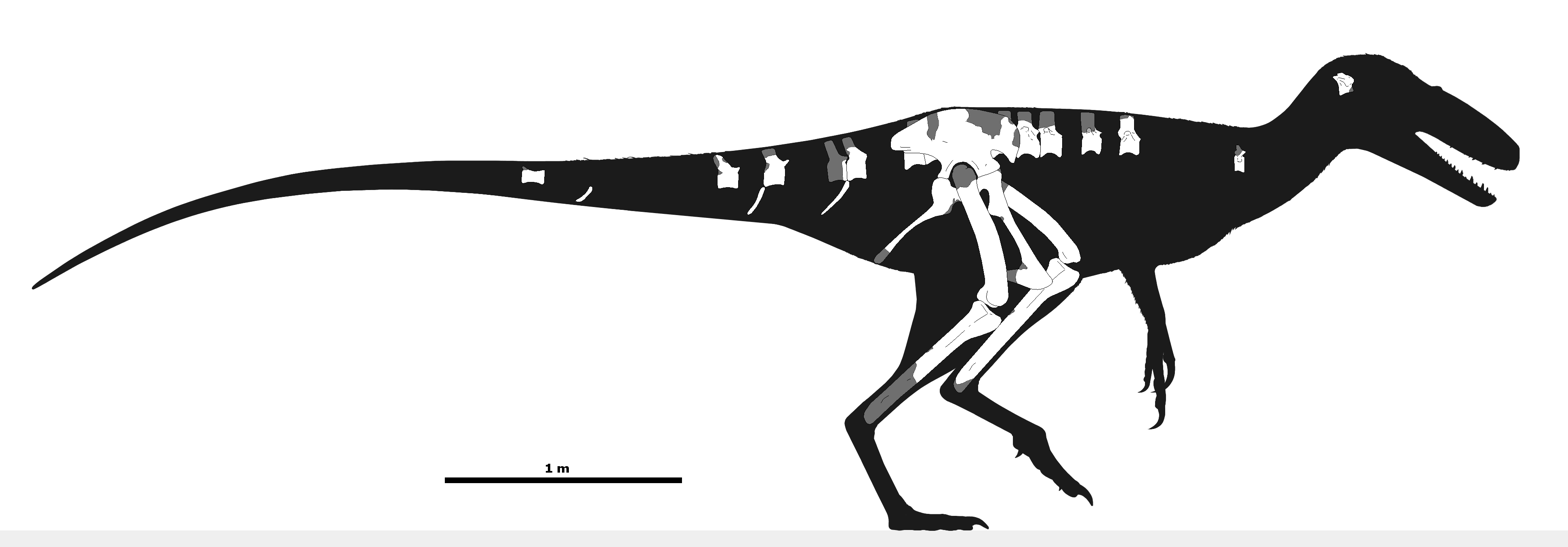
- Restoration illustrating known fossil remains in white

Scientific classification
- Kingdom: Animalia
- Phylum: Chordata
- Class: Reptilia
- Clade: Dinosauria
- Clade: Saurischia
- Clade: Theropoda
- Superfamily: †Tyrannosauroidea
- Clade: †Pantyrannosauria
- Family: †Stokesosauridae
- Genus: †Juratyrant; Brusatte & Benson, 2013
- Species: †J. langhami

Binomial name
- †Juratyrant langhami (Benson, 2008)

Synonyms
- Stokesosaurus langhami Benson, 2008

= Juratyrant =

Juratyrant Temporal range: Tithonian ~149.3–149 Ma

Genus of dinosaurs

Juratyrant (meaning "Jurassic tyrant") is a genus of tyrannosauroid dinosaur from the late Jurassic period (early Tithonian age) of England. The genus contains a single species, Juratyrant langhami, which was once classified as a species of Stokesosaurus.

== Discovery ==
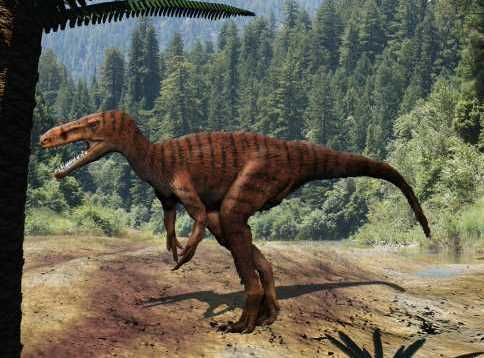
Restoration

The species is known from a single specimen consisting of an "associated partial skeleton represented by a complete pelvis" as well as a partially complete leg and neck, back and tail vertebrae. This skeleton was discovered in 1984 in Dorset. The specimen was mentioned in several papers, but was not formally described until 2008. The species was named in honor of commercial fossil collector Peter Langham, who uncovered the specimen. The specimen was discovered in strata of the Kimmeridge Clay dating from the Tithonian, the final stage of the Late Jurassic, and belonging to the Pectinatites pectinatus ammonite zone, indicating the fossil is between 149.3 and 149 million years old.

== Description ==
In 2013, Zanno and Makovicky estimated that Juratyrant weighed up to 648 kilograms (1,429 lb). In 2016, Paul listed it at five metres (16 ft) and 300 kilograms (660 lb).

The holotype of Juratyrant is a partial skeleton composed of specimens OUMNH J.3311-1 through OUMNH J.3311-30. Its components include a cervical vertebra, five dorsal vertebrae, a complete sacrum, five caudal vertebrae, a complete pelvic girdle, both femurs, both tibiae, and various other fragments. Although initially considered a species of Stokesosaurus due to various traits of the ilium, subsequent review has shown that due to the limited amount of pelvic material for basal tyrannosauroids, these traits cannot be assumed to only be present in these two species and thus S. langhami must be placed in its own genera. Once separated from Stokesosaurus, Juratyrant can be characterized by four autapomorphies, as well as two assumed autapomorphies (which are difficult to assess due to preservation):

- An ischial apron with a "folded" appearance.
- A fibular flange that continues as a distinct low ridge to the proximal end of the tibia.
- A convex tubercule on the ischium.
- A deep lateral fossa on the pubis below the acetabulum.
- A thin but prominent hyposphene on the fifth sacral vertebra (assumed).
- A broad, concave extensor groove of the femur (assumed).

== Classification ==
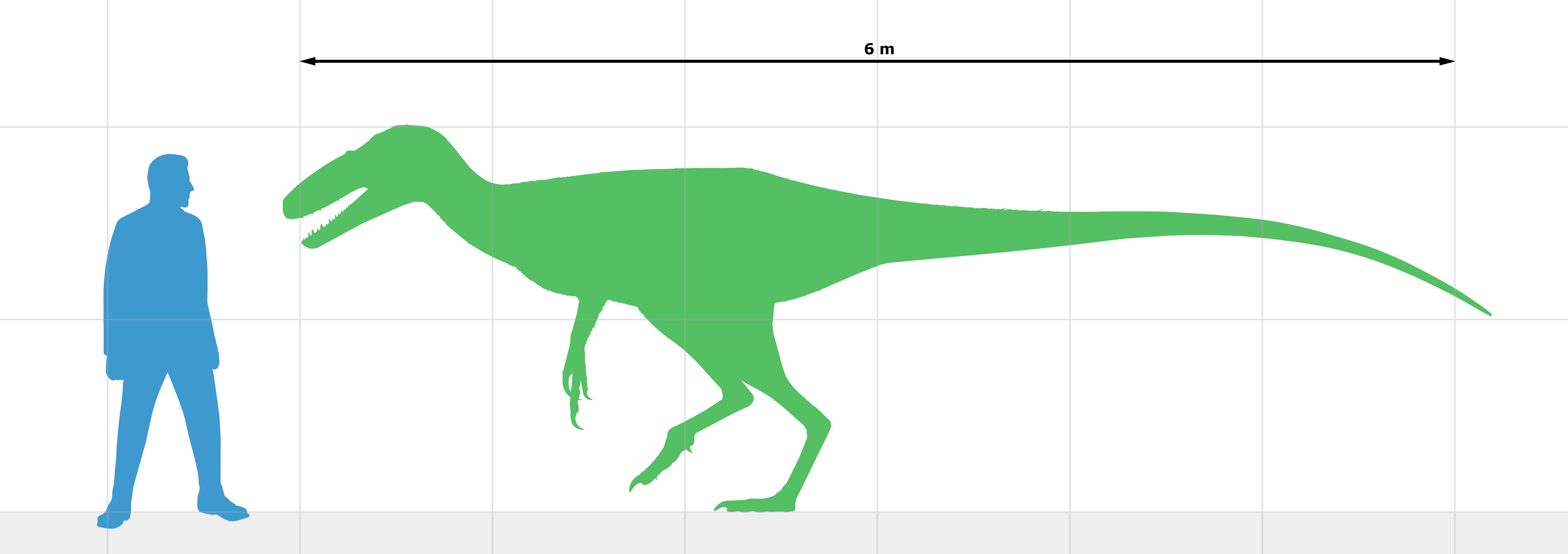
Estimated size compared to a human

The species was originally assigned to the genus Stokesosaurus, as Stokesosaurus langhami, by Roger Benson in 2008. However, later studies showed that it was not necessarily a close relative of Stokesosaurus clevelandi, the type species of that genus. It was formally re-classified in its own genus, Juratyrant, by Benson and Stephen L. Brusatte in 2013 and placed as a sister taxon to Stokesosaurus clevelandi in a clade (also including Eotyrannus) of basal tyrannosauroids more advanced than Dilong.

However, in 2013 Loewen et al. published a cladogram placing Juratyrant as a sister taxon to Stokesosaurus inside Proceratosauridae due to sharing with Sinotyrannus a narrow preacetabular notch. Many basal tyrannosauroids have incomplete or unknown ilia and this trait may be more widespread than currently known. This cladogram is shown below.

- Tyrannosauroidea
  - Proceratosauridae
    - - Proceratosaurus bradleyi
      - Kileskus aristotocus
      - Guanlong wucaii
    - - Sinotyrannus kazuoensis
      - - Juratyrant langhami
        - Stokesosaurus clevelandi
  - - Dilong paradoxus
    - - Eotyrannus lengi
      - - Bagaraatan ostromi
        - - Raptorex kriegsteini
          - - Dryptosaurus aquilunguis
            - - - Alectrosaurus olseni
                - Xiongguanlong baimoensis
              - - Appalachiosaurus montgomeriensis
                - - - Alioramus altai
                    - Alioramus remotus
                  - Tyrannosauridae

However, a 2016 analysis by Brusatte and Carr utilizing both parsimonious and Bayesian phylogeny placed Stokesosaurus and Juratyrant as tyrannosauroids slightly more advanced than the Proceratosauridae and Dilong. In addition, Eotyrannus is recovered as a sister taxon of these genera in the parsimonious phylogeny.

In their 2025 revision of the enigmatic Brazilian coelurosaurians Mirischia and Santanaraptor, Delcourt et al. found the placement of Juratyrant to be highly labile to analytical method: Using equal-weight phylogenetic analyses, it resolved as an ancestral megaraptoran outside Megaraptoridae; if this is correct, it would be the oldest record of the Megaraptora at that time. However, implied-weight phylogenetic analyses gave a wholly different placement, largely consistent with the 2013 results of Loewen et al.. Here, Juratyrant formed a clade with Mirischia, Santanaraptor and Tanycolagreus; if this is correct, Stokesosaurus and perhaps Sinotyrannus would also belong to this group, which in contrast to the 2013 results turns up basal within Maniraptoromorpha (and outside Tyrannosauroidea) in the 2025 study, close to Proceratosauridae but not actually within them. In either case however, Santanaraptor resolves as a close relative of Juratyrant.

== See also ==
- Timeline of tyrannosaur research
