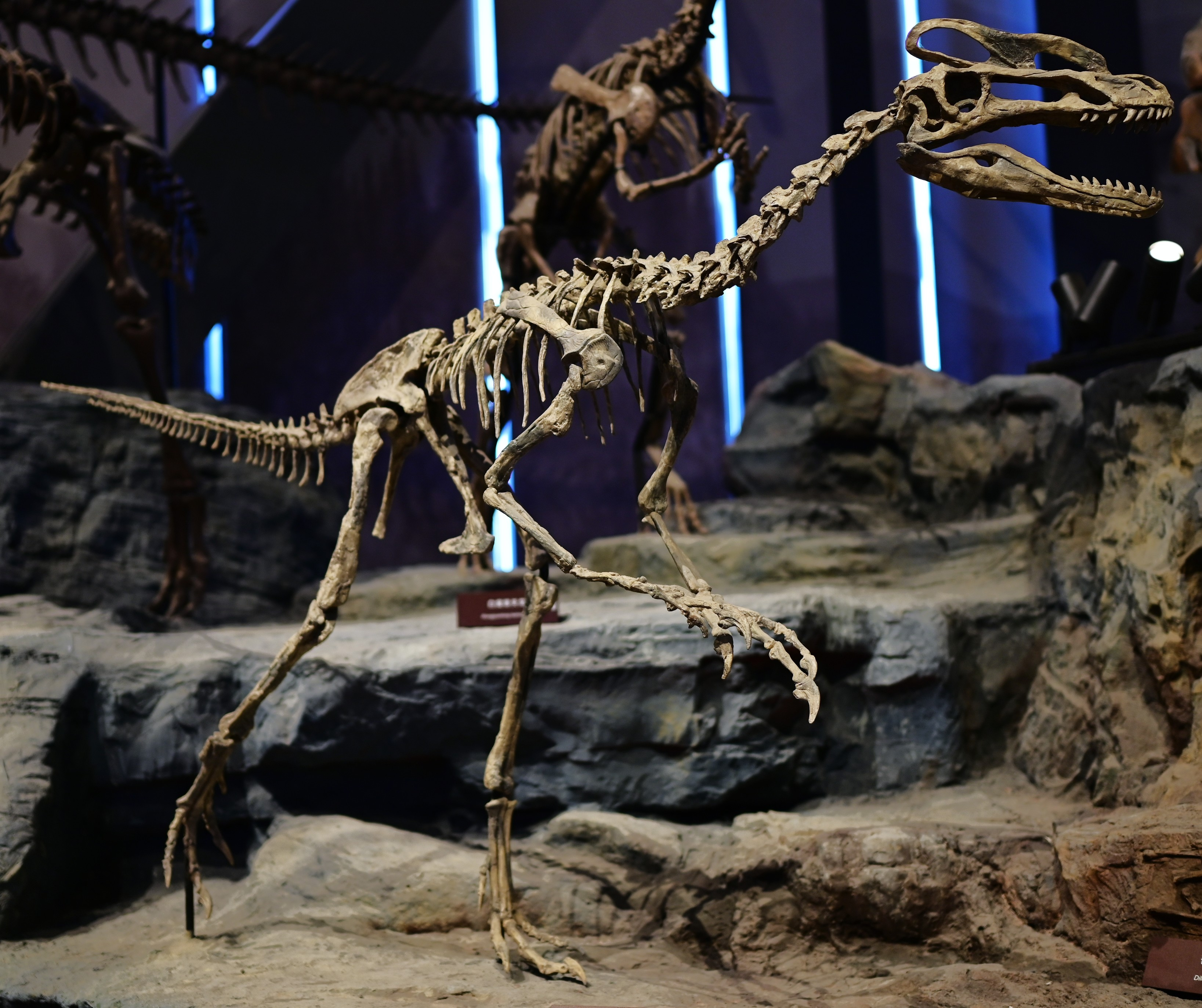
- Skeletal mount

Scientific classification
- Kingdom: Animalia
- Phylum: Chordata
- Class: Reptilia
- Clade: Dinosauria
- Clade: Saurischia
- Clade: Theropoda
- Superfamily: †Tyrannosauroidea
- Family: †Proceratosauridae
- Genus: †Guanlong; Xu et al., 2006
- Species: †G. wucaii

Binomial name
- †Guanlong wucaii Xu et al., 2006

= Guanlong =

Guanlong Temporal range: Late Jurassic (Oxfordian), 160 Ma

Extinct genus of dinosaur

Guanlong (Chinese: 冠龍; lit. 'crown dragon') is an extinct genus of proceratosaurid tyrannosauroid dinosaur from the Late Jurassic (Oxfordian) Shishugou Formation of China. It was first described in 2006 by Xu Xing and colleagues, who found it to represent a new taxon related to Tyrannosaurus. Two individuals are currently known, consisting of a partially complete adult and a nearly complete juvenile.

== Discovery ==
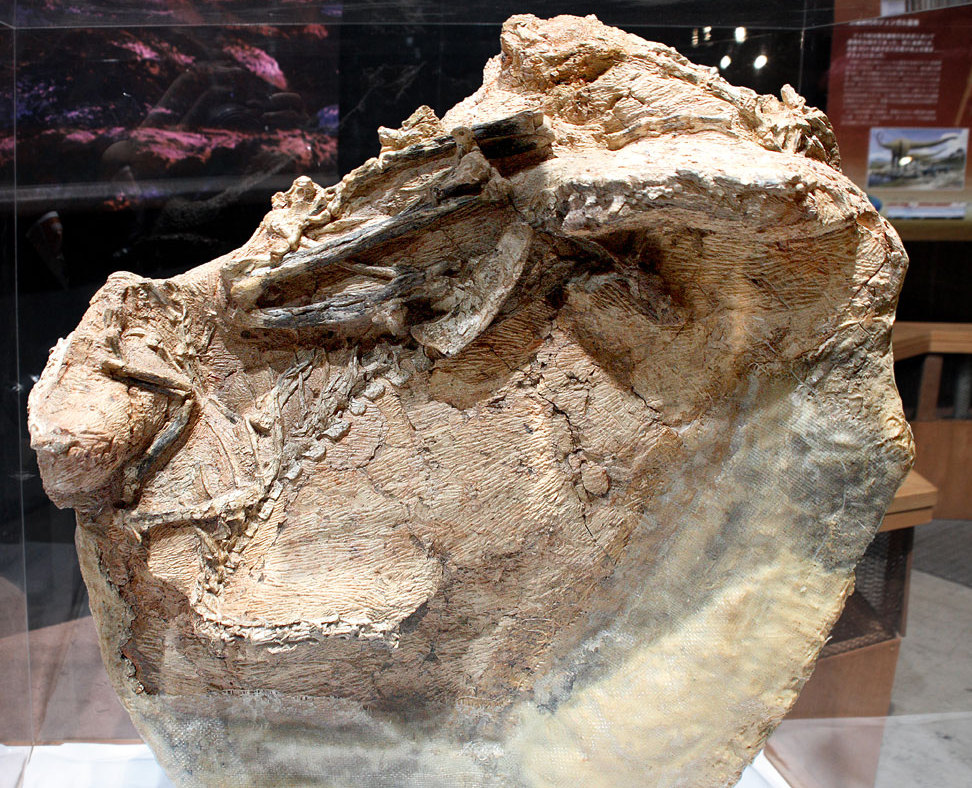
Paratype skull and skeleton

Guanlong was discovered in the Dzungaria area of China by a joint expedition by scientists from the Institute of Vertebrate Paleontology and Paleoanthropology and George Washington University, and named by Xu Xing and others in 2006. Guanlong comes from the Chinese words for "crown" (Chinese: 冠; pinyin: guān) and "dragon" (龍; lóng), referring to the crest. The specific epithet, wucaii (), means "multicoloured" and refers to the colours of rock of the Wucaiwan (五彩灣; 'five-colored bay', 'multicolored bay'), the multi-hued badlands where the creature was found.

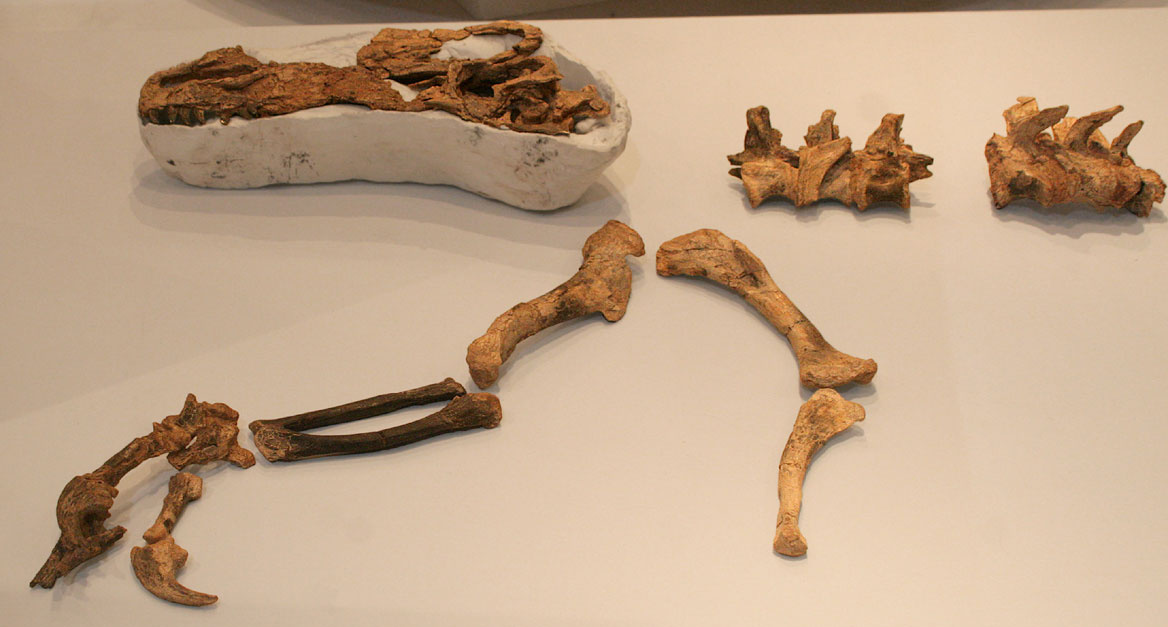
Adult material

At present, Guanlong is known from two specimens, one discovered on top of the other, with three other individual theropod dinosaurs, in the Shishugou Formation. The holotype (IVPP V14531) is a reasonably complete, partially articulated adult skeleton, and was the one on top. Another, immature specimen, the paratype IVPP V14532, is known from fully articulated and nearly complete remains. It was presumed to have been trampled, after death, by the adult. The crest on the skull of the immature specimen is notably smaller and restricted to the forward portion of the snout, while the adult has a larger and more extensive crest. The crests of both specimens are thin, delicate structures that likely served as display organs, possibly for events like mating.

== Description ==
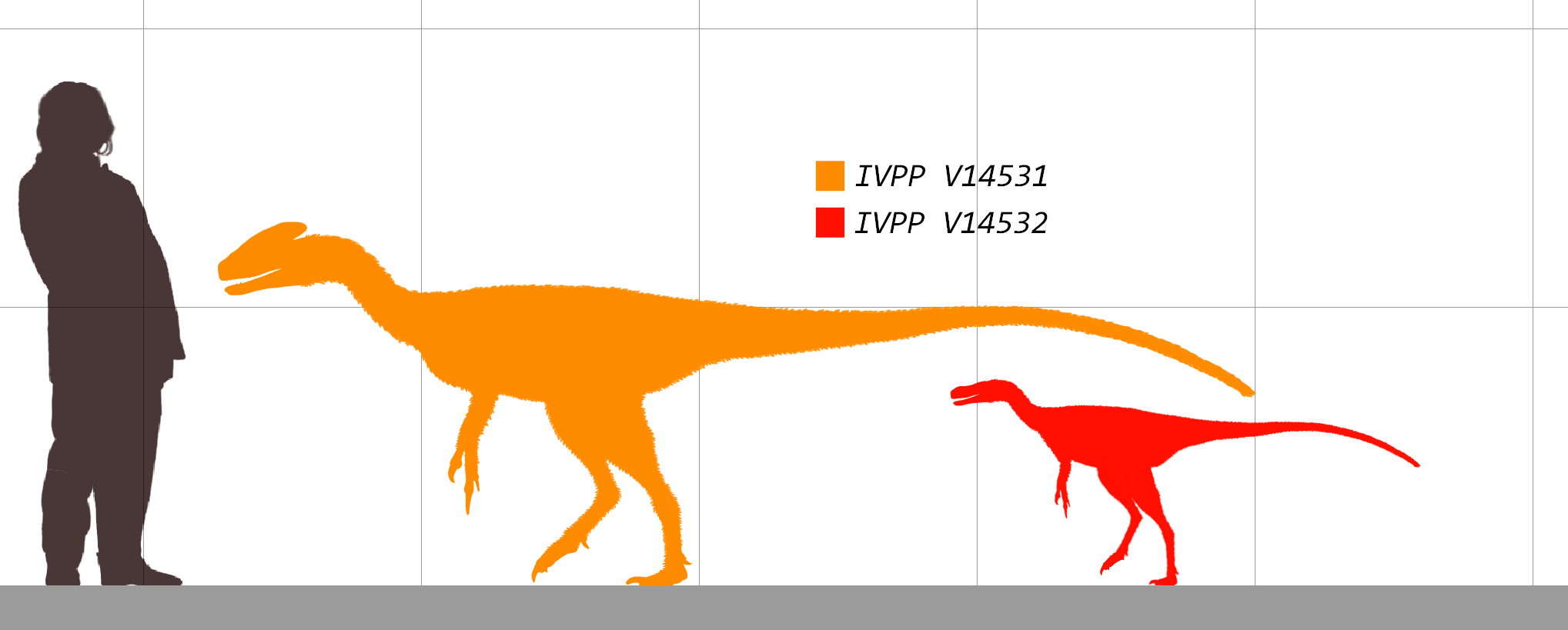
Both Guanlong specimens compared to a human

Guanlong was a relatively small theropod, reaching 3–3.5 m (9 ft 10 in – 11 ft 6 in) in length and 125 kg (276 lb) in body mass. Its fossils were found in the Shishugou Formation dating to about 160 million years ago, in the Oxfordian stage of the Late Jurassic period, 92 million years before its well-known relative Tyrannosaurus. This bipedal saurischian theropod shared many traits with its descendants, and also had some unusual ones, like a large crest on its head. Unlike later tyrannosaurs, Guanlong had three long fingers on its hands. Aside from its distinctive crest, it would have resembled its close relative Dilong, and like Dilong may have had a coat of primitive feathers.

== Classification ==
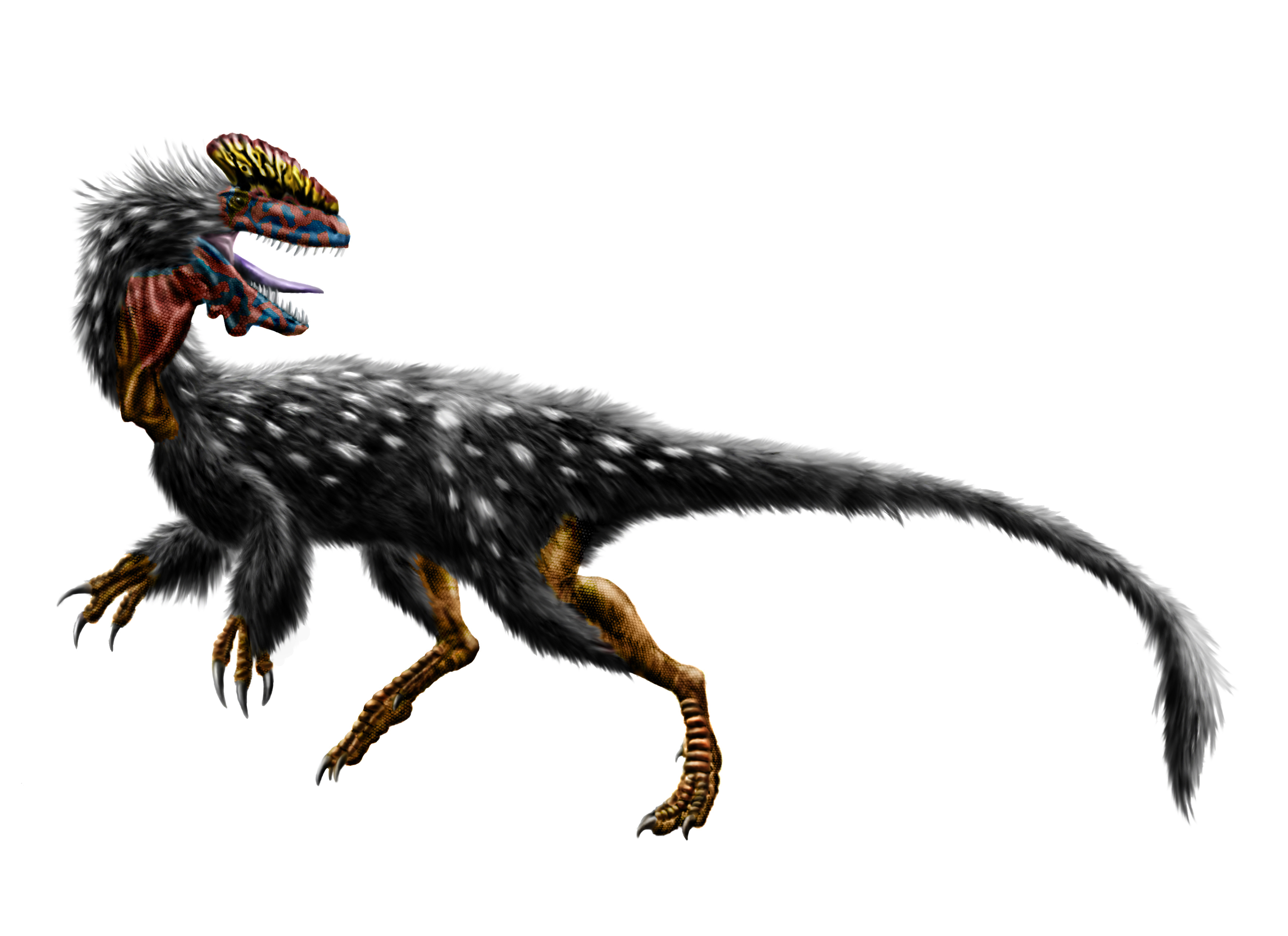
Body restoration

A 2013 study found Guanlong to be in a clade with both Proceratosaurus and Kileskus. Together they formed the family Proceratosauridae with a clade containing Sinotyrannus, Juratyrant and Stokesosaurus. However, in 2014 another study was published, instead finding Stokesosaurus and Juratyrant outside the family, which only included Guanlong, Proceratosaurus, Kileskus and Sinotyrannus.

Below is a simplified cladogram of the later analysis, from Fiorillo & Tykoski, 2014.

- Proceratosauridae
  - Kileskus
  - - Guanlong
    - - Proceratosaurus
      - Sinotyrannus

In 2024, the describers of Alpkarakush recovered Dilong and proceratosaurids (Proceratosaurus and Guanlong) outside Tyrannosauroidea based on their phylogenetic analysis.

== Paleobiology ==
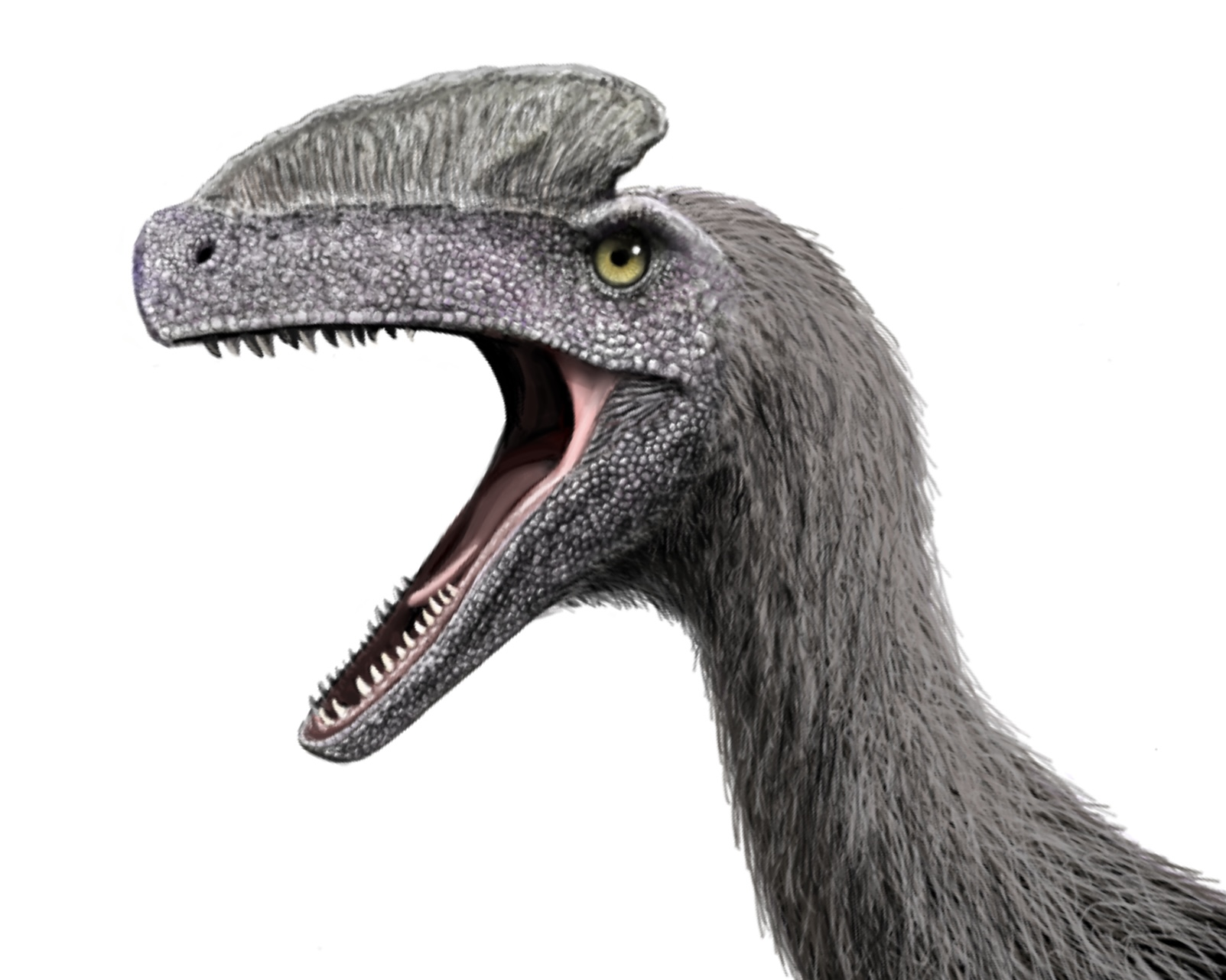
Head restoration

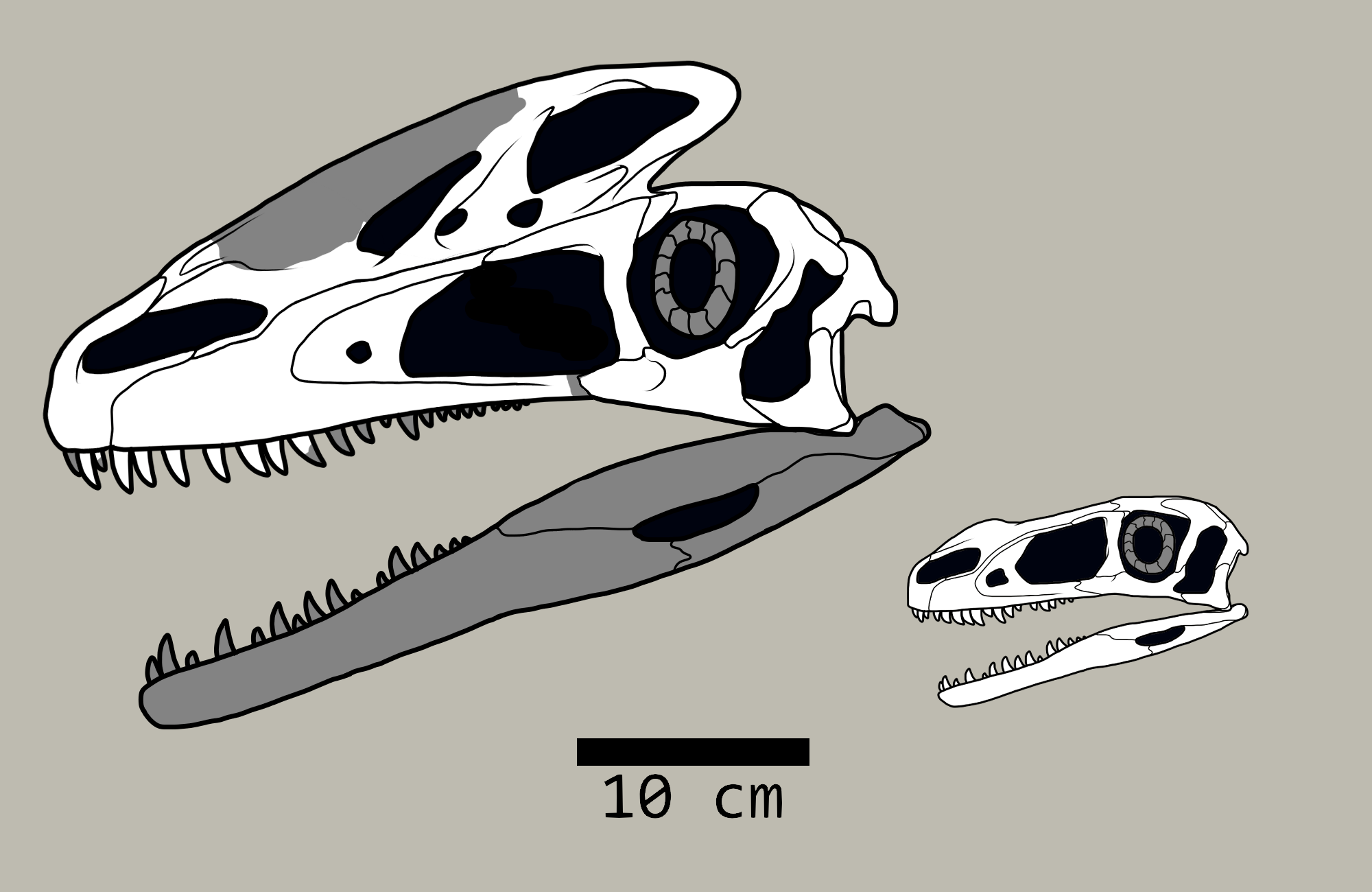
Skull diagrams of both Guanlong specimens with known material in white.

The ages of the two individuals were determined using a histological analysis. The adult was shown to have matured at 7 years of age, and died at the age of 12. The juvenile died at 6, and was still growing. As the individuals are of different ages, some of the changes that took place during growth can be seen. In the juvenile, the crest is restricted to the snout, which is proportionally shorter. The orbit is also larger, the hand comparatively larger, the lower leg is longer, the pubic bone has a less expanded end, and other features found in more derived coelurosaurs and tyrannosauroids.

Guanlong possessed a cranial crest, which may have been used for display. It is similar to those of Dilophosaurus and Monolophosaurus, and like those it was highly pneumatized. However, it was more delicate than in the other genera, and also proportionately larger and more elaborate. Structures in Dilophosaurus and Monolophosaurus have also been suggested to be for species recognition, but the more gracile crest of Guanlong is more likely for display purposes.

== See also ==
- Timeline of tyrannosaur research
