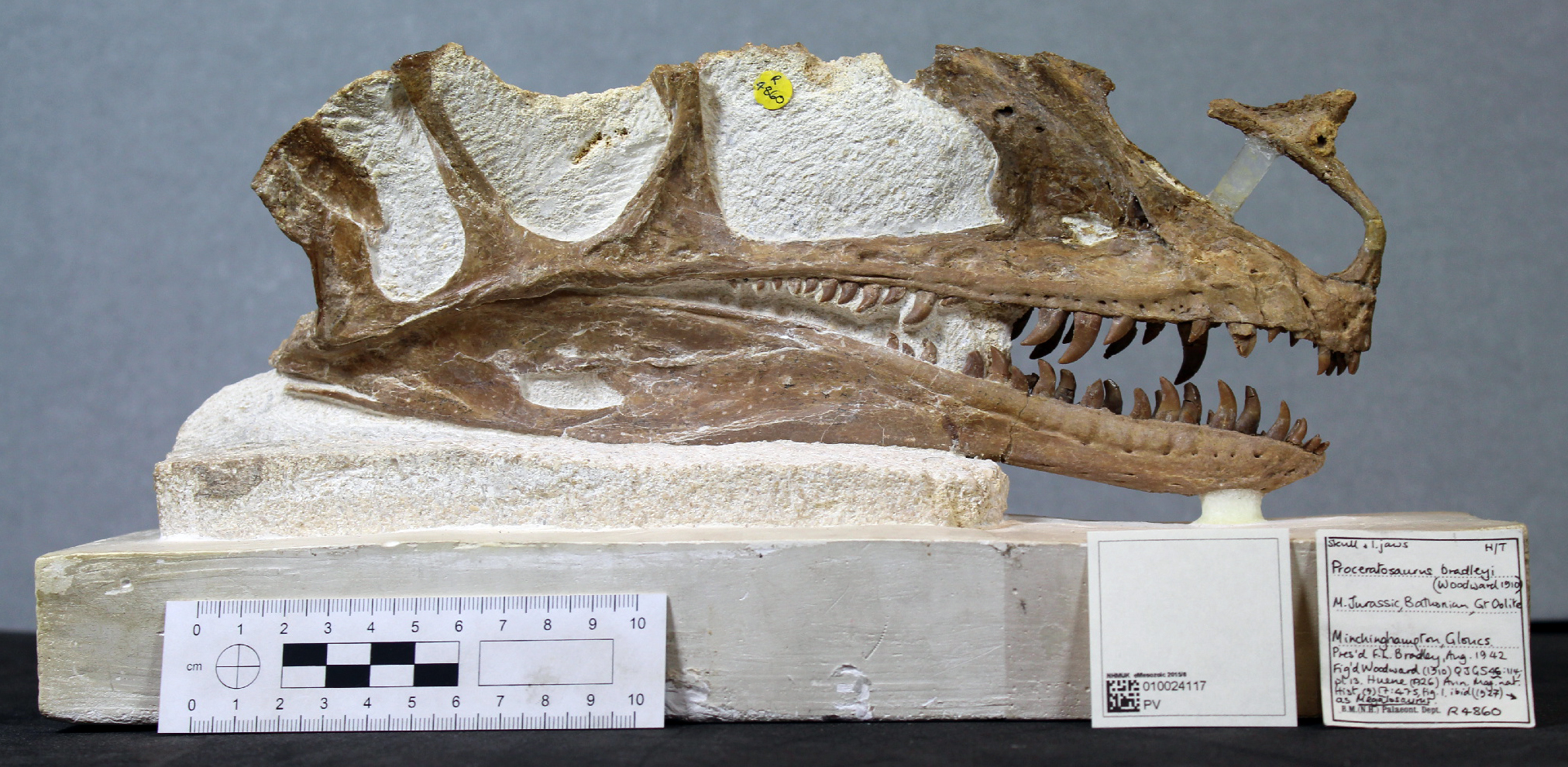
- Holotype skull of Proceratosaurus bradleyi (NHMUK PV R 4860)
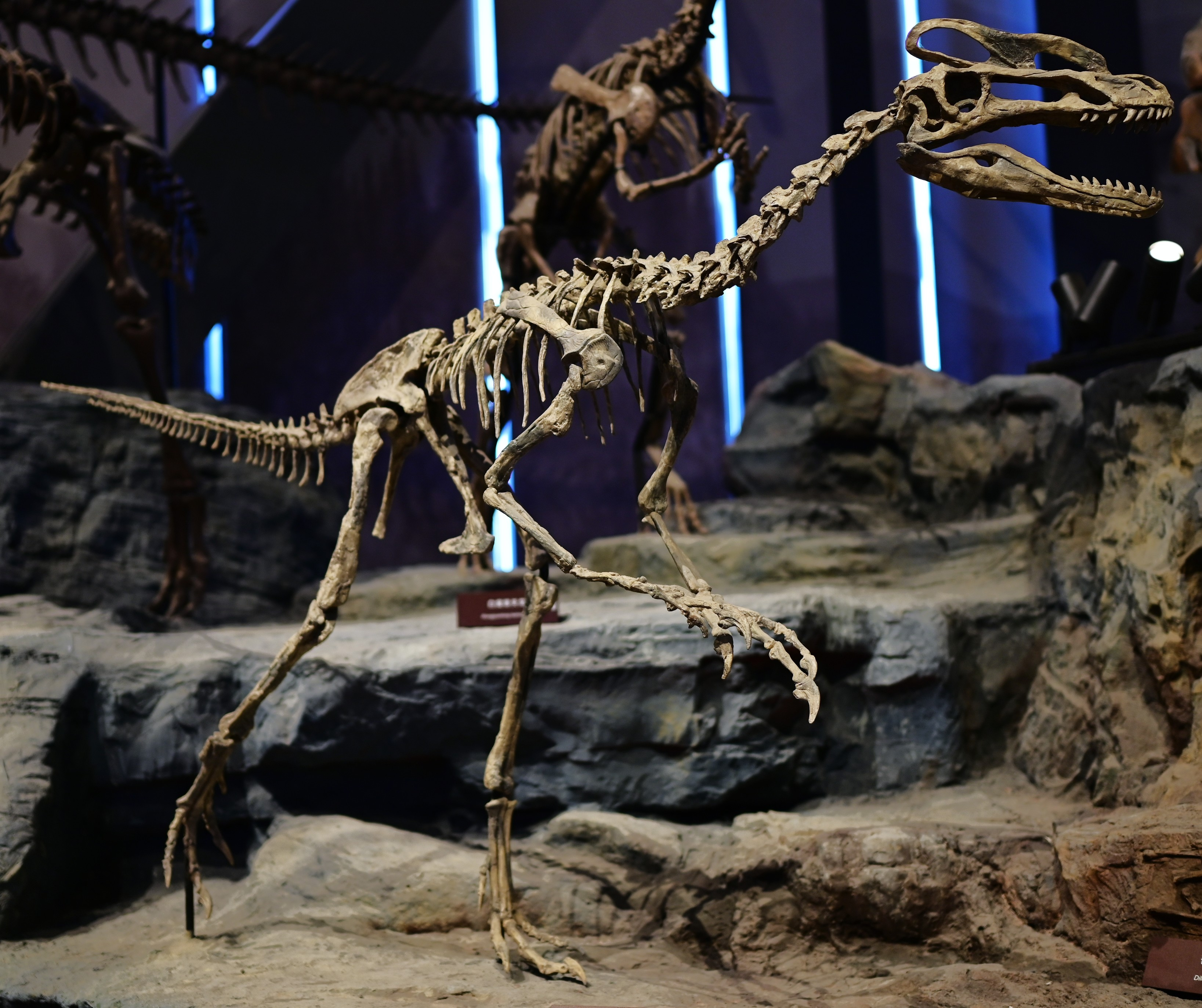
- Skeleton of Guanlong

Scientific classification
- Kingdom: Animalia
- Phylum: Chordata
- Class: Reptilia
- Clade: Dinosauria
- Clade: Saurischia
- Clade: Theropoda
- Superfamily: †Tyrannosauroidea
- Family: †Proceratosauridae; Rauhut, Milner & Moore-Fay, 2010

Type species
- †Proceratosaurus bradleyi Woodward, 1910

Subgroups
- †Dilong?; †Guanlong; †Juratyrant?; †Kileskus; †Nuthetes?; †Proceratosaurus; †Sinotyrannus; †Stokesosaurus?; †Yutyrannus?

= Proceratosauridae =

Proceratosaurids Temporal range: Middle Jurassic - Early Cretaceous, 166–120 Ma

Extinct family of dinosaurs

Proceratosauridae is a family or clade of tyrannosauroid theropod dinosaurs from the Middle Jurassic to the Early Cretaceous.

== Distinguishing features ==
Unlike the advanced tyrannosaurids but similar to primitive tyrannosauroids like Dilong, proceratosaurids were generally small (with the exception of the possible proceratosaurids Yutyrannus and Sinotyrannus) and had fairly long, three-fingered arms capable of grasping prey. In comparison to other members of Tyrannosauroidea, proceratosaurids can be distinguished by the following features according to phylogenetic analyses by Averianov et al. (2010) and Loewen et al. (2013) :

- A sagittal cranial crest formed by the nasals starting at the junction of the premaxilla and nasals.
- Extremely elongated external nares, with posterior margins posterior to the anterior margin of the antorbital fossa and maxillary fenestrae.
- A short ventral margin of the premaxilla.
- The depth of the antorbital fossa ventral to the antorbital fenestra being much greater than that of the maxilla below the antorbital fossa.
- A ventrally concave ischium.
- A convex tubercule on the anterior margin of the pubis just ventral to contact with the ilium.
- A short and shallow concave step on the anterior margin of the maxilla.

== Classification ==
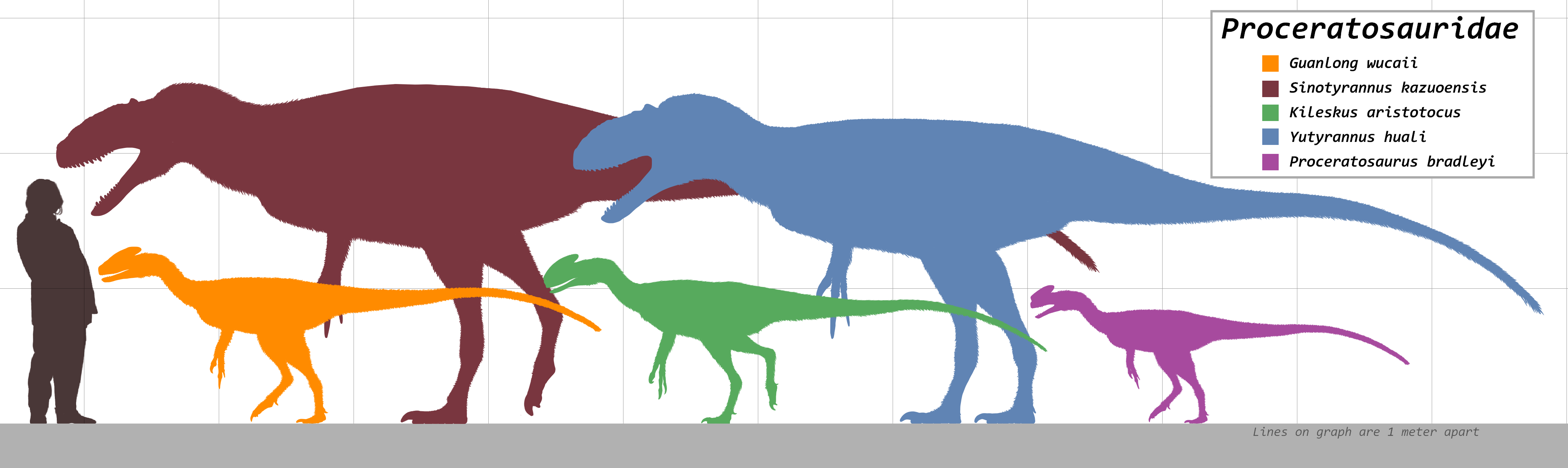
Size comparion between dinosaurs assigned to Proceratosauridae.

The family belongs or is closely related to the tyrannosaur lineage. It was first named in 2010 by Oliver Rauhut and colleagues in their re-evaluation of the type genus, Proceratosaurus. Their study supported the idea that Proceratosaurus is a coelurosaur, a tyrannosauroid, and most closely related to the Chinese tyrannosauroid Guanlong. They defined the clade containing these two dinosaurs as all theropods closer to Proceratosaurus than to Tyrannosaurus, Allosaurus, Compsognathus, Coelurus, Ornithomimus, or Deinonychus. Later studies included the Russian Kileskus and the Chinese Sinotyrannus in the family. By the mid-2010s, Proceratosauridae was considered to include Proceratosaurus, Guanlong, Kileskus, Sinotyrannus, and the genera Stokesosaurus, Juratyrant, and Dilong previously recognized as non-proceratosaurid tyrannosauroids. In their re-evaluation of Proceratosaurus, Rauhut et al. stated that tooth taxa from the Late Jurassic and Early Cretaceous previously assigned to the dromaeosaurid subfamily Velociraptorinae may instead be proceratosaurid in nature, due to the similarity between the teeth of the two groups and the fact that velociraptorines are otherwise unknown from the fossil record until the Late Cretaceous. This would mean that Nuthetes and other dubious genera are potential proceratosaurids.

Below is the cladogram by Loewen et al. in 2013.

- Proceratosauridae
  - - Proceratosaurus
    - Kileskus
    - Guanlong
  - - Sinotyrannus
    - - Juratyrant
      - Stokesosaurus

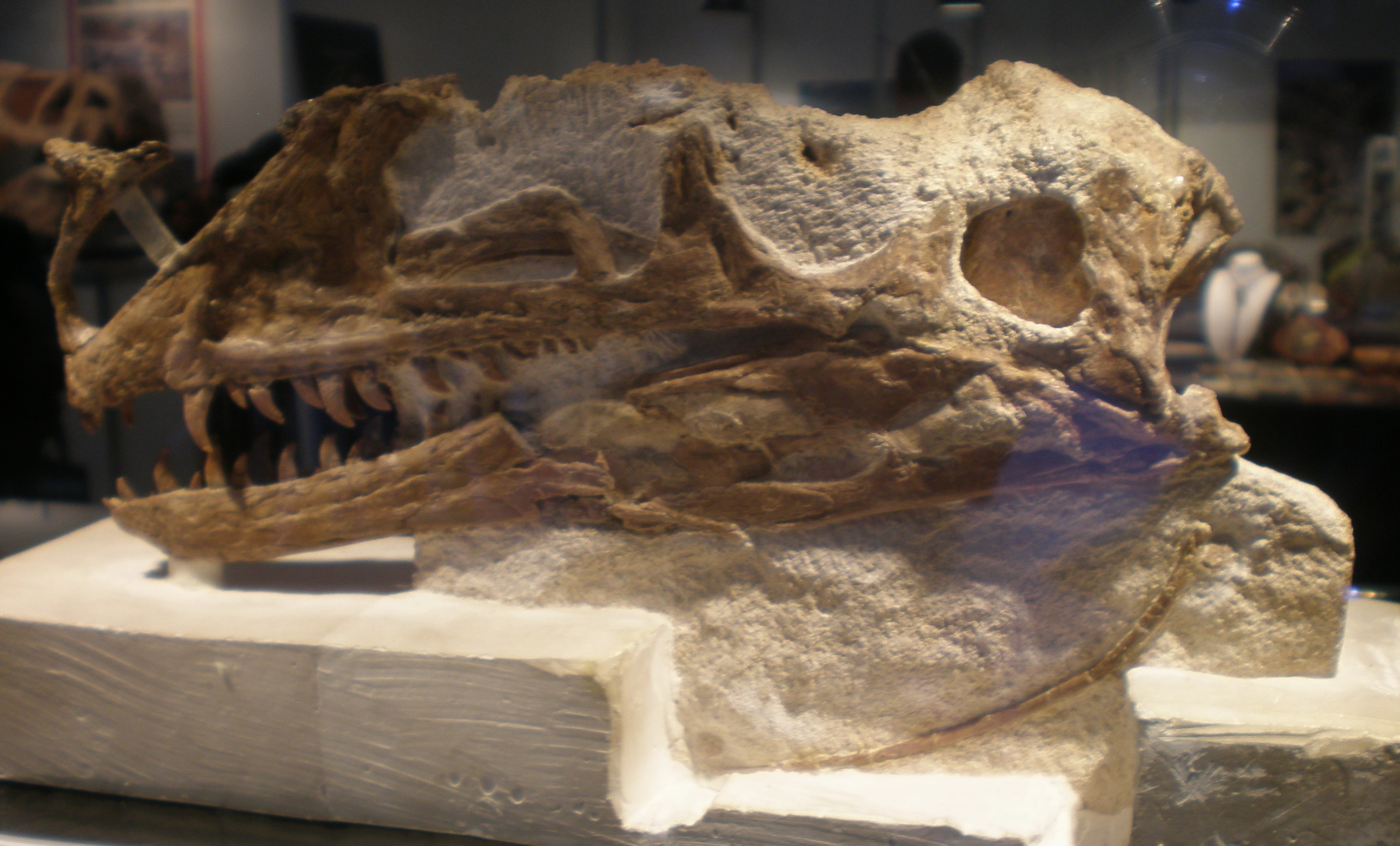
The skull of Proceratosaurus

An analysis by Brusatte et al. in 2016 provides both parsimony and Bayesian phylogenetic analyses, with Yutyrannus being placed within Proceratosauridae as a sister taxon to Sinotyrannus and Juratyrant and Stokesosaurus being placed as more advanced tyrannosauroids in each instance. The Bayesian analysis is shown below.

- Proceratosauridae
  - Guanlong
  - - Proceratosaurus
    - - Kileskus
      - - Yutyrannus
        - Sinotyrannus

Below is a cladogram from Naish and Cau (2022):

- Tyrannosauroidea
  - - Juratyrant
    - Stokesosaurus
  - - Coeluridae
    - - Proceratosauridae
        - Dilong
        - - Guanlong
          - - Proceratosaurus
            - Sinotyrannus
      - Pantyrannosauria
        - Yutyrannus
        - - Eotyrannus
          - - Xiongguanlong
            - - Megaraptora
              - Eutyrannosauria

In their comprehensive revision of the enigmatic Brazilian coelurosaurians Mirischia and Santanaraptor, Delcourt et al. (2025) consistently supported a clade containing Dilong, Guanlong, Kileskus and Proceratosaurus. Tanycolagreus was grouped with this clade in equal-weight phylogenetic analyses, but was also grouped with Mirischia, Santanaraptor and Juratyrant in implied-weight phylogenetic analyses. Unlike previous analyses, they found the Proceratosauridae as early-diverging maniraptoromorphs outside Tyrannosauroidea.

== See also ==
- Timeline of tyrannosaur research
