= Timeline of tyrannosaur research =

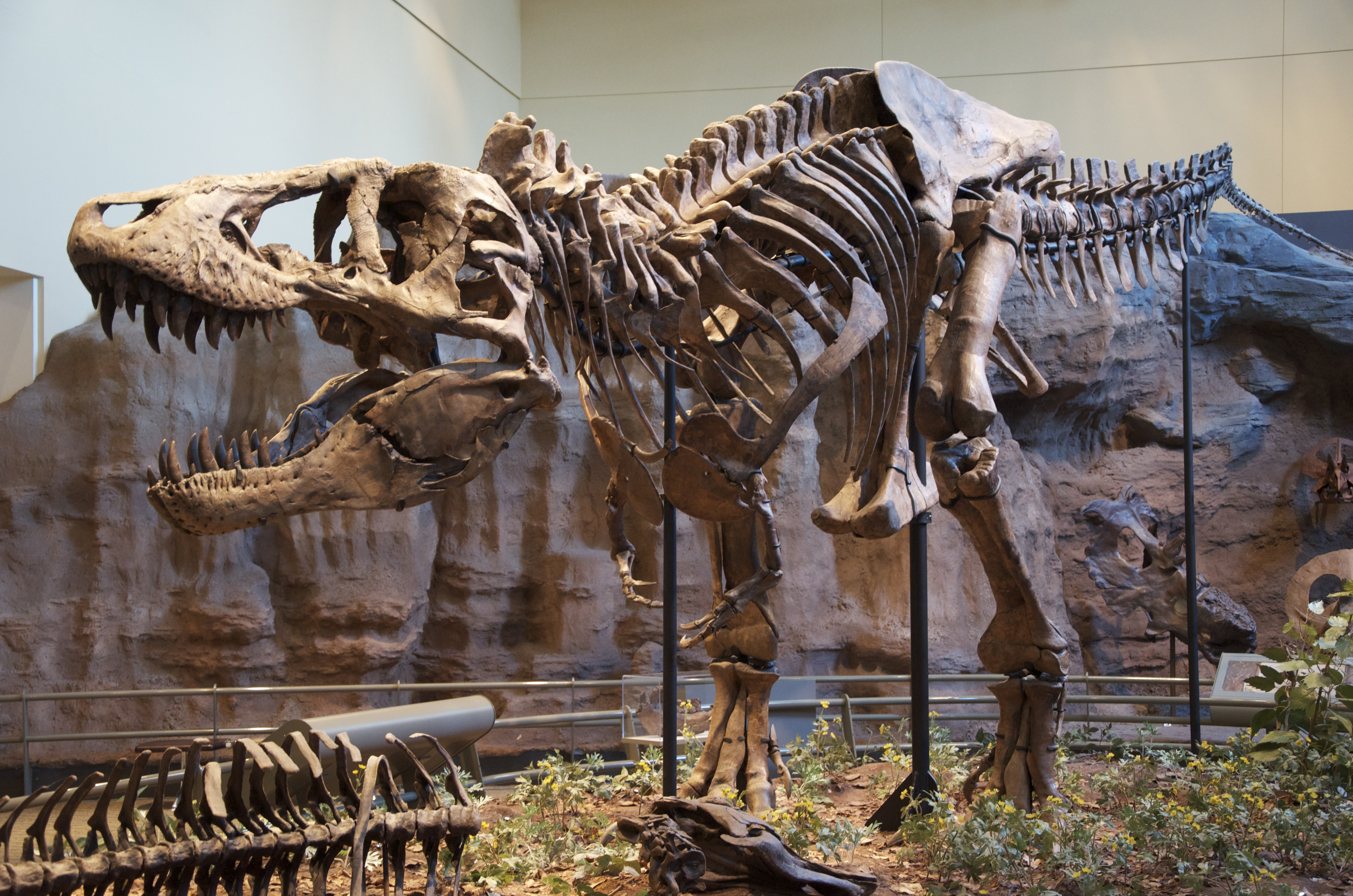
Skeletal mount of the Tyrannosaurus holotype.

This timeline of tyrannosaur research is a chronological listing of events in the history of paleontology focused on the tyrannosaurs, a group of predatory theropod dinosaurs that began as small, long-armed bird-like creatures with elaborate cranial ornamentation but achieved apex predator status during the Late Cretaceous as their arms shrank and body size expanded. Although formally trained scientists did not begin to study tyrannosaur fossils until the mid-19th century, these remains may have been discovered by Native Americans and interpreted through a mythological lens. The Montana Crow tradition about thunder birds with two claws on their feet may have been inspired by isolated tyrannosaurid forelimbs found locally. Other legends possibly inspired by tyrannosaur remains include Cheyenne stories about a mythical creature called the Ahke, and Delaware stories about smoking the bones of ancient monsters to have wishes granted.

Tyrannosaur remains were among the first dinosaur fossils collected in the United States. The first of these was named Deinodon horridus by Joseph Leidy. However, as this species was based only on teeth the name would fall into disuse. Soon after, Edward Drinker Cope described Laelaps aquilunguis from a partial skeleton in New Jersey. Its discovery heralded the realization that carnivorous dinosaurs were bipeds, unlike the lizardlike megalosaurs sculpted for the Crystal Palace. Laelaps was also among the first dinosaurs to be portrayed artistically as a vigorous, active animal, presaging the dinosaur renaissance by decades. Later in the century, Cope's hated rival Othniel Charles Marsh would discover that the name Laelaps had already been given to a parasitic mite, and would rename the dinosaur Dryptosaurus.

Early in the 20th century, Tyrannosaurus itself was discovered by Barnum Brown and named by Henry Fairfield Osborn, who would recognize it as a representative of a distinct family of dinosaurs he called the Tyrannosauridae. Tyrannosaur taxonomy would be controversial for many decades afterward. One controversy centered around the use of the name Tyrannosauridae for this family, as the name "Deinodontidae" had already been proposed. The name Tyrannosauridae came out victorious following arguments put forth by Dale Russell in 1970. The other major controversy regarding tyrannosaur taxonomy was the family's evolutionary relationships. Early in the history of paleontology, it was assumed that the large carnivorous dinosaurs were all part of one evolutionary lineage ("carnosaurs"), while the small carnivorous dinosaurs were part of a separate lineage (coelurosaurs). Tyrannosaurid anatomy led some early researchers like Matthew, Brown, and Huene, to cast doubt on the validity of this division. However, the traditional carnosaur-coelurosaur division persisted until the early 1990s, when the application of cladistics to tyrannosaur systematics confirmed the doubts of early workers and found tyrannosaurs to be large-bodied coelurosaurs.

Another debate about tyrannosaurs would not be settled until the early 21st century: their diet. Early researchers were so overwhelmed by the massive bulk of Tyrannosaurus that some, like Lawrence Lambe, were skeptical that it was even capable of hunting down live prey and assumed that it lived as a scavenger. This view continued to be advocated into the 1990s by Jack Horner but was shown false by Kenneth Carpenter, who reported the discovery of a partially healed tyrannosaur bite wound on an Edmontosaurus annectens tail vertebra, proving that T. rex at least sometimes pursued living victims.

== Prescientific ==
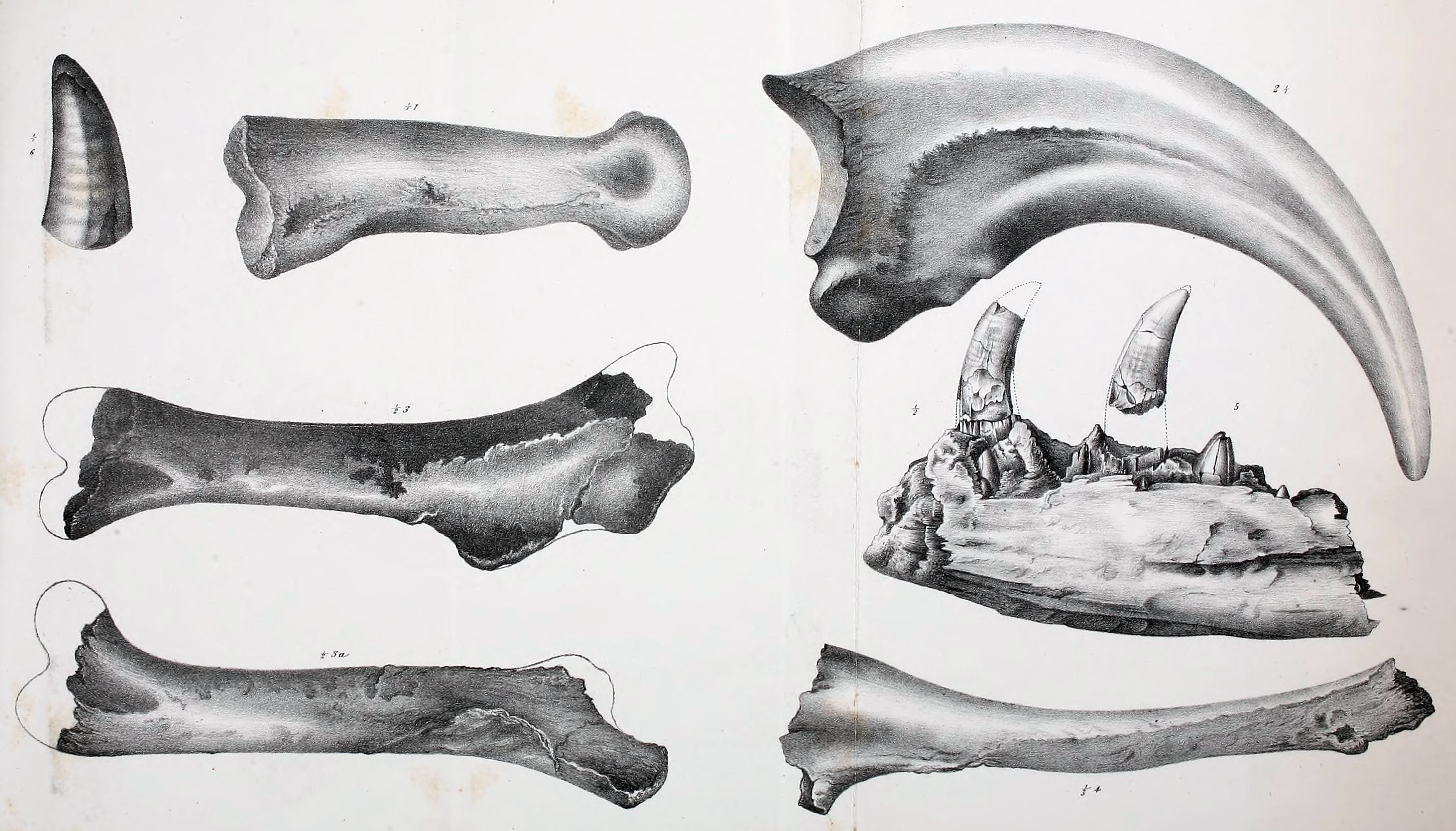
Bones of Dryptosaurus, originally known as Laelaps.

- The Delaware people of what is now New Jersey or Pennsylvania had a tradition regarding a hunting party that returned with a piece of an ancient bone supposedly belonging to a monster that killed humans. One of the village's wise men instructed people to burn bits of the bone in clay spoons with tobacco and make a wish while the concoction was still smoking. This ritual could bestow such favors as success in hunting, long life, and health for one's children. This tale might be inspired by local fossils, which include Dryptosaurus, ankylosaurs, Coelosaurus, and Hadrosaurus.
- The Cheyenne believed that a mythical creature called an Ahke once lived in the prairies of the western United States. These creatures were thought to resemble giant buffalo, whose bones turned to stone. Ahke bones were found both on land as well as buried in the banks of streams. Tyrannosaurus fossils preserved in Hell Creek Formation strata may have been influences on this old legend. Its contemporary Triceratops is another possible influence, as well as the more recent Cenozoic fossils of Titanotherium and mastodons.

== 19th century ==
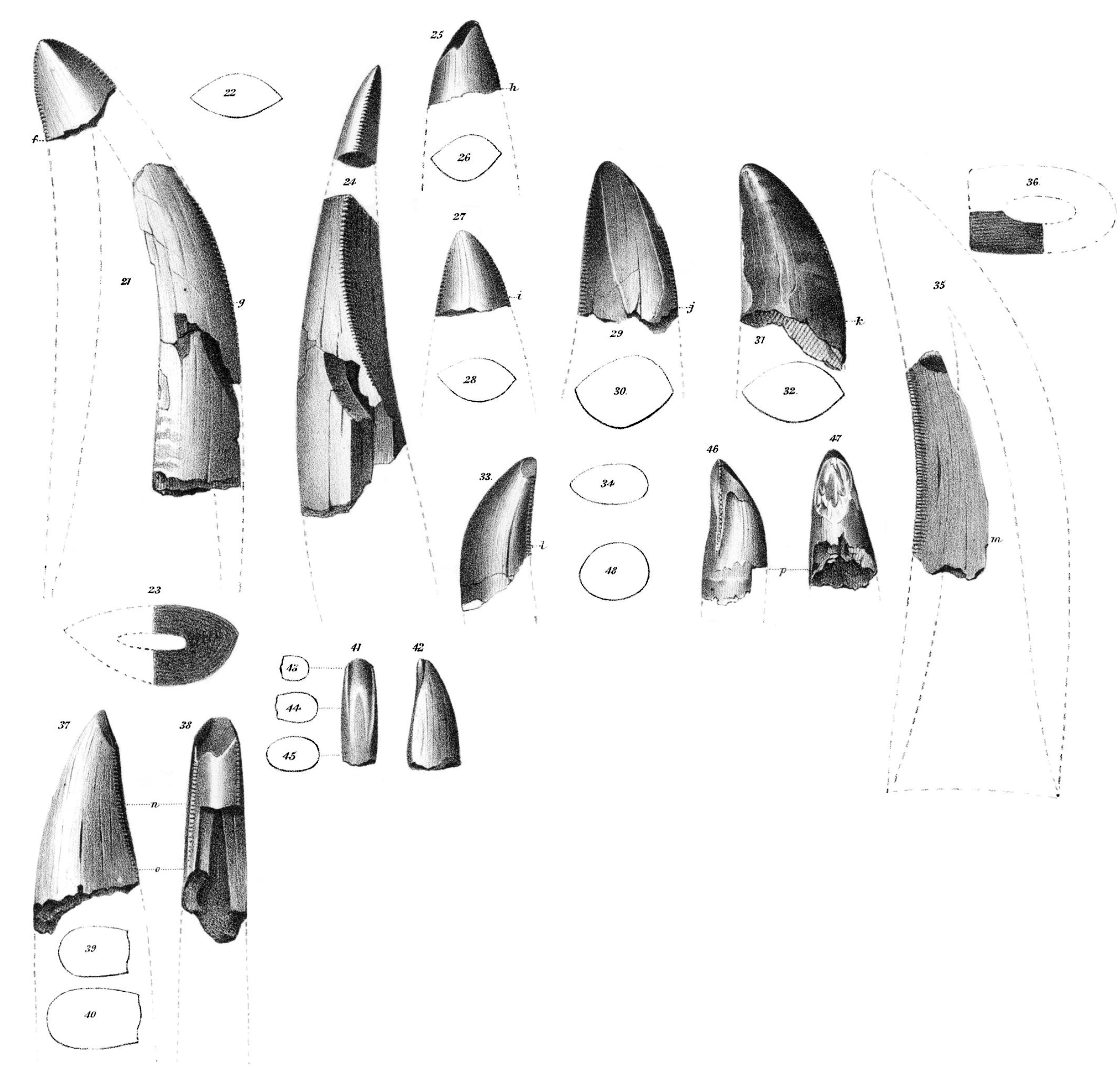
Illustration of the teeth of Deinodon.

=== 1850s ===
==== 1856 ====
- Joseph Leidy described the new genus and species Deinodon horridus.

=== 1860s ===
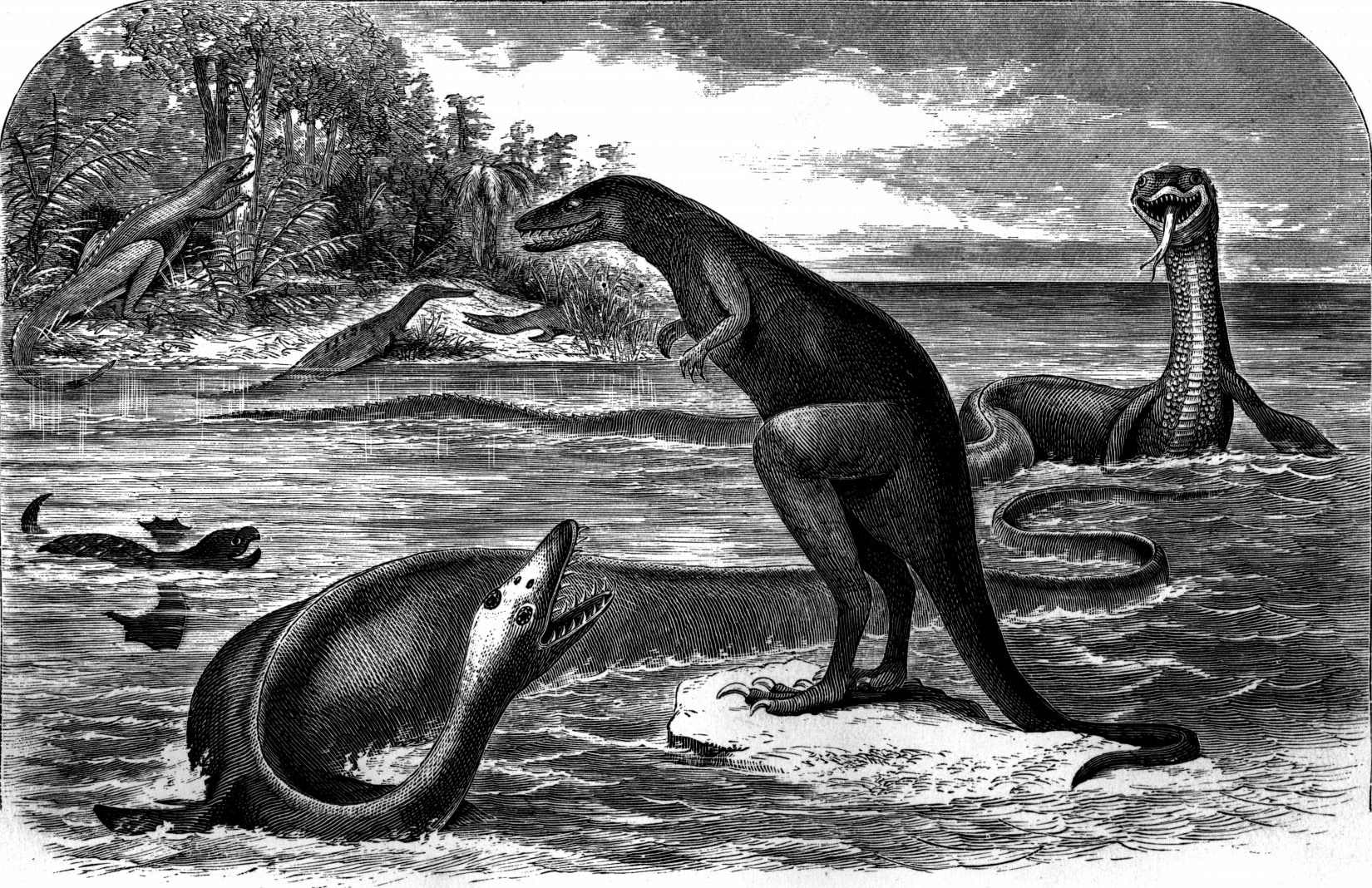
Inaccurate reconstructions of "Laelaps aquilunguis" and Elasmosaurus (1869).

==== 1865 ====
- Leidy described the new genus and species Tomodon horrificus.

==== 1866 ====
- Edward Drinker Cope described the new genus and species Laelaps aquilunguis. This discovery proved that theropod dinosaurs walked on their hind limbs rather than on all fours like in earlier reconstructions. He also erected the family Deinodontidae.

==== 1868 ====
- Leidy described the new genus and species Aublysodon mirandus.
- Leidy described the new genus Diplotomodon for the species Tomodon horrificus.
- Cope described the new species Laelaps macropus.

=== 1870s ===
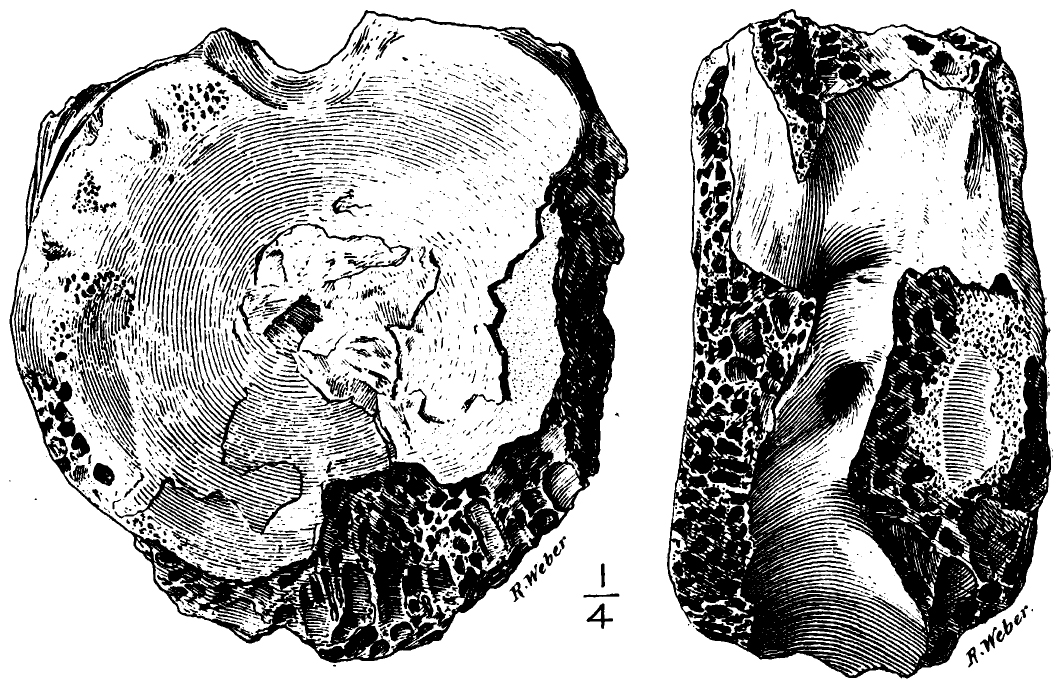
Illustration of the type specimen (AMNH 3982) of Manospondylus gigas

==== 1876 ====
- Cope described the new species Laelaps incrassatus and Laelaps falculus. He also described Aublysodon lateralis.
- Cope described the new species Laelaps hazenianus.

==== 1877 ====
- Othniel Charles Marsh described the new genus Dryptosaurus to house the species Laelaps aquilunguis.

=== 1880s ===
==== 1884 ====
- Joseph Burr Tyrrell discovered a partial Albertosaurus skull near Kneehills Creek in Alberta, Canada. This specimen is now catalogued as CMN 5600.

=== 1890s ===
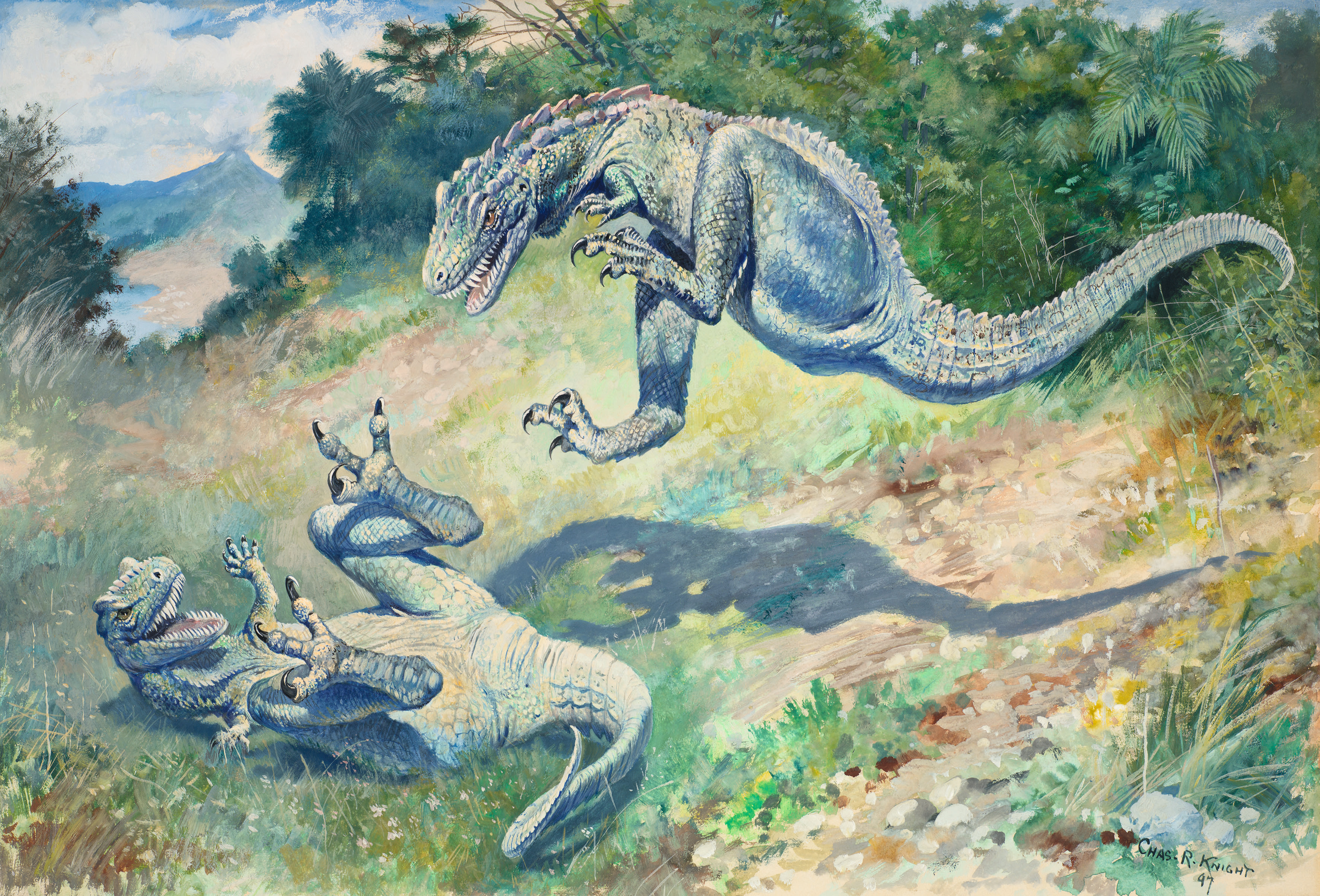
Leaping Laelaps by Charles R. Knight, 1896.

==== 1890 ====
- Marsh described the new species Ornithomimus grandis.

==== 1892 ====
- Cope described the new genus and species Manospondylus gigas.
- Marsh described the new species Aublysodon amplus and A. cristatus.
- Oliver Perry Hay described the new species Dryptosaurus kenabakides.

== 20th century ==
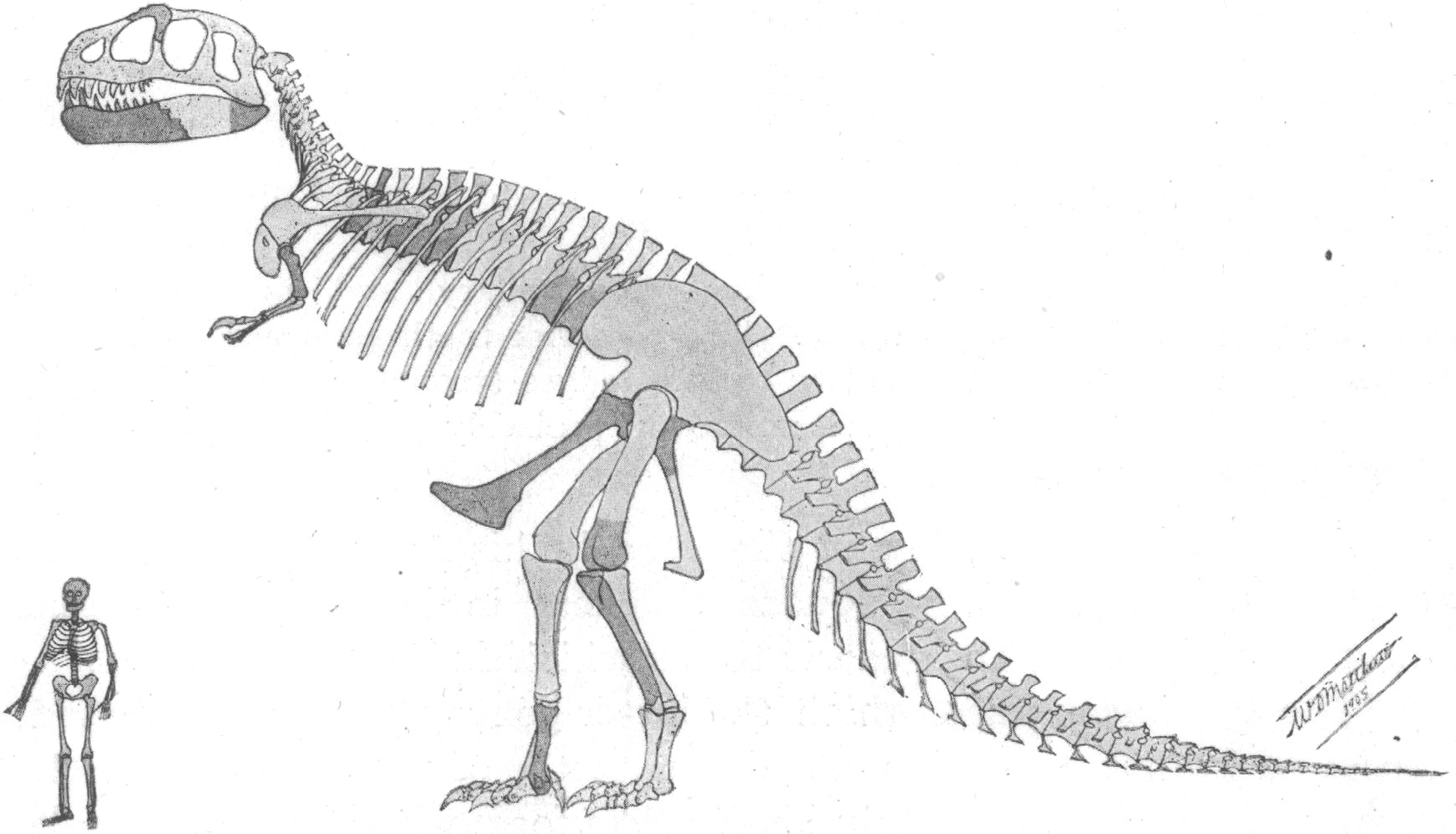
Skeletal reconstruction of T. rex from the original description.

=== 1900s ===
==== 1900 ====
- Barnum Brown found a partial skeleton of Tyrannosaurus in eastern Wyoming.

==== 1902 ====
- Barnum Brown found a substantially complete skeleton of Tyrannosaurus in the Hell Creek Formation of Montana.

==== 1905 ====
- Henry Fairfield Osborn named the Tyrannosauridae. Osborn described the new genus and species Albertosaurus sarcophagus. Osborn described the new genus and species Tyrannosaurus rex. Osborn described the new genus and species Dynamosaurus imperiosus.

=== 1910s ===
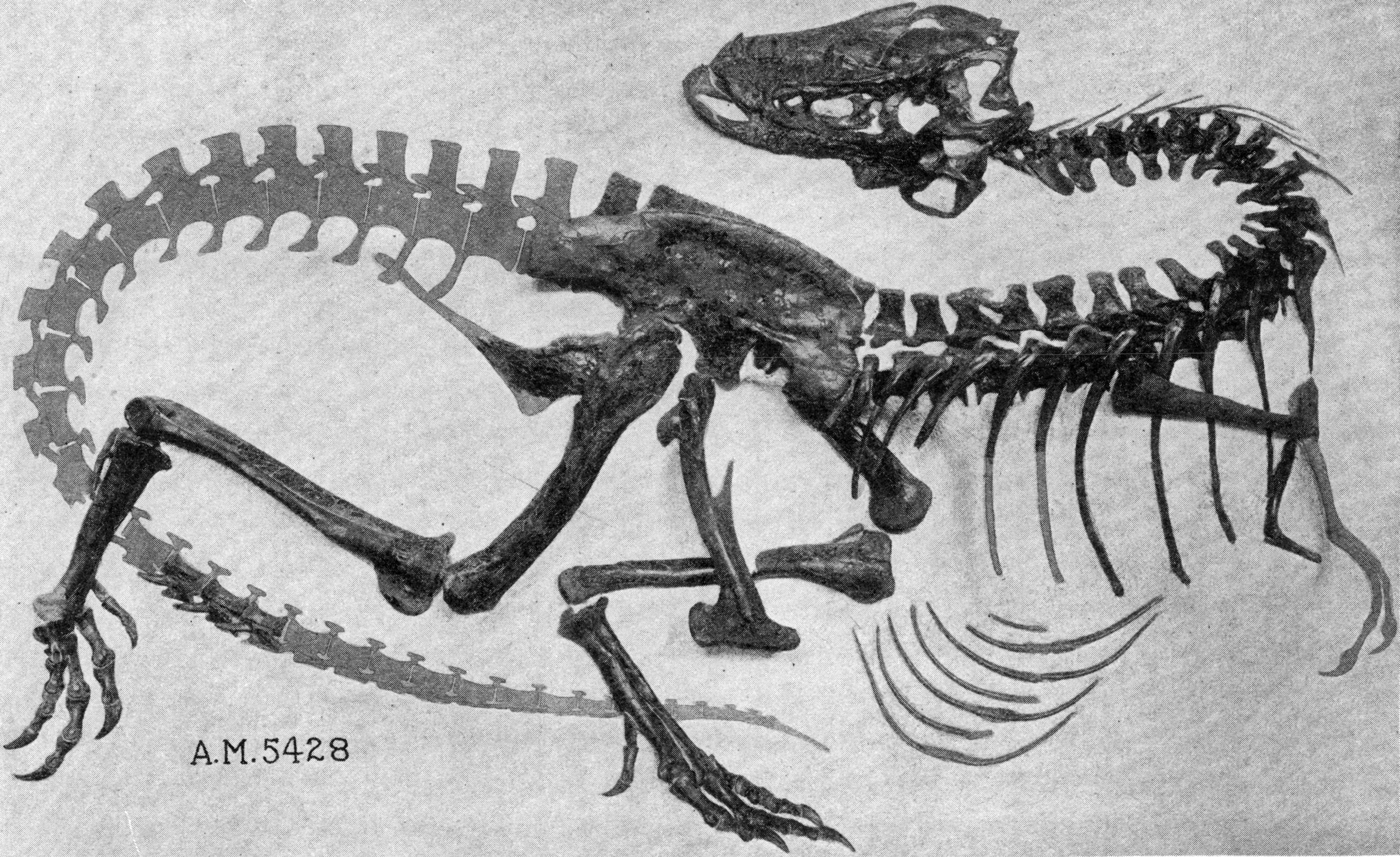
Skeleton of Gorgosaurus libratus.

==== 1914 ====
- Lawrence Lambe described the new genus and species Gorgosaurus libratus.
- Barnum Brown emended Cope's "Dinodontidae" to "Deinodontidae".

==== 1917 ====
- Lambe interpreted tyrannosaurids as scavengers.

=== 1920s ===
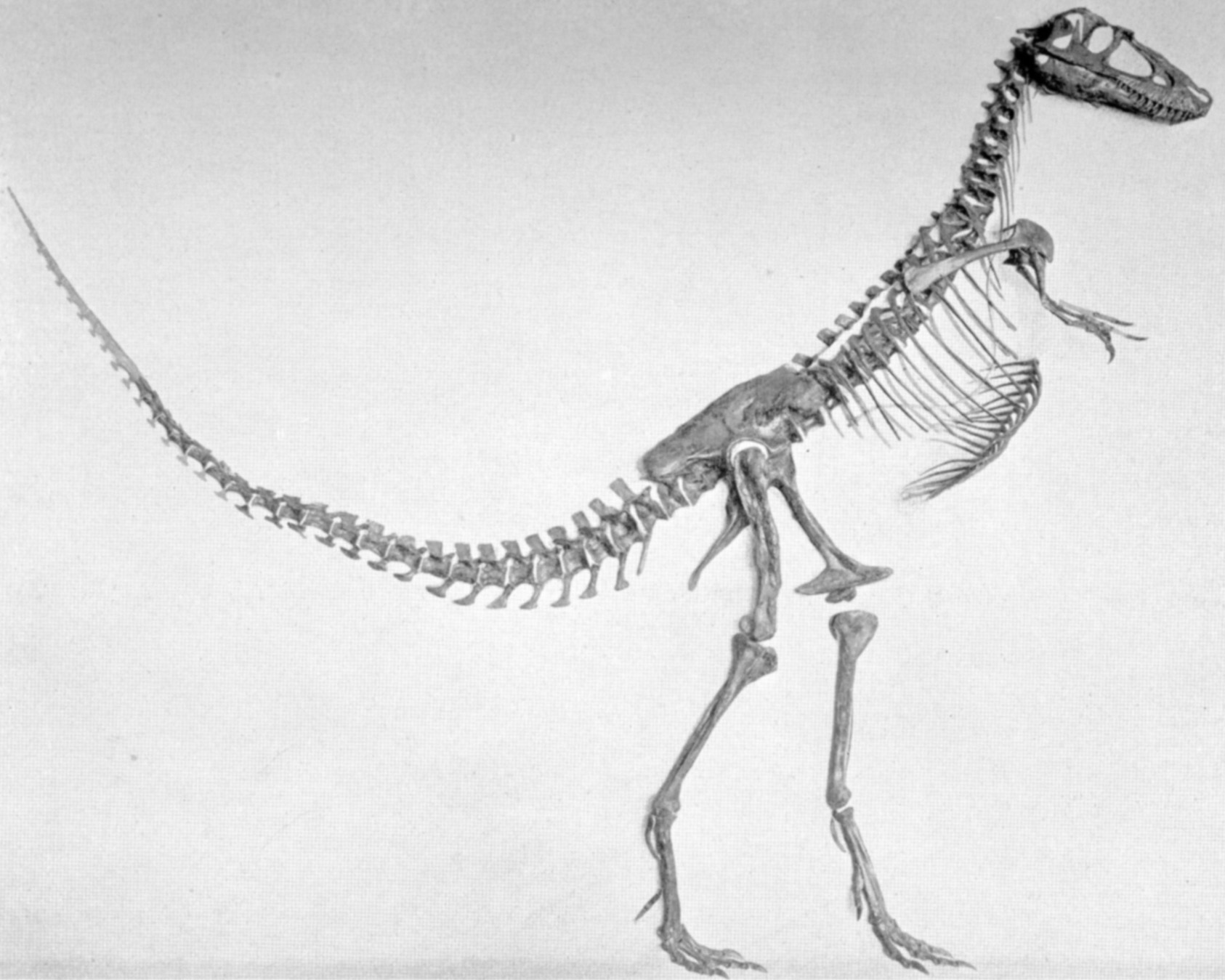
Type specimen of Gorgosaurus sternbergi, now recognized as a juvenile Gorgosaurus libratus.

==== 1922 ====
- Matthew and Brown named the Tyrannosaurinae. Despite still classifying tyrannosaurs as members of the family Deinodontidae, they proposed that, contrary to researchers who regarded tyrannosaurs as carnosaurs related to other large carnivorous dinosaurs like Allosaurus and Megalosaurus, the tyrannosaurs were actually more closely related to the small carnivores known as coelurosaurs.

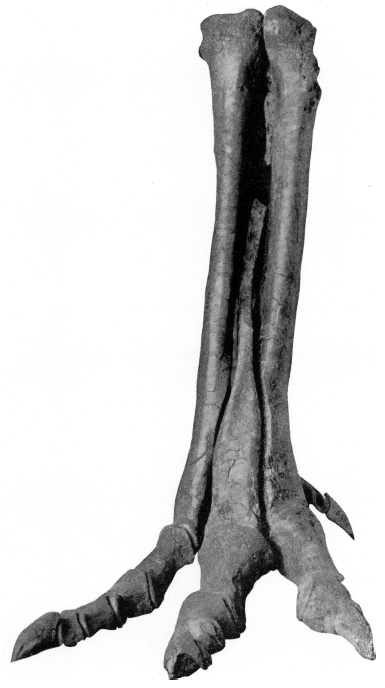
Foot of Alectrosaurus olseni.

==== 1923 ====
- Matthew and Brown described the new species Gorgosaurus sternbergi. They still regarded tyrannosaurs as members of the family Deinodontidae.
- Friedrich von Huene regarded tyrannosaurs as members of the family Deinodontidae and advocated for the hypothesis that tyrannosaurs were more closely related to the small carnivores called coelurosaurs than to other large carnivorous dinosaurs like Allosaurus and Megalosaurus.

==== 1928 ====
- William Parks described the new species Albertosaurus arctunguis.

=== 1930s ===
==== 1930 ====
- Anatoly Nikolaevich Riabinin described the new species Albertosaurus periculosus.

==== 1932 ====
- Von Huene classified tyrannosaurs as carnosaurs.

==== 1933 ====
- Charles Whitney Gilmore described the new genus and species Alectrosaurus olseni.

=== 1940s ===
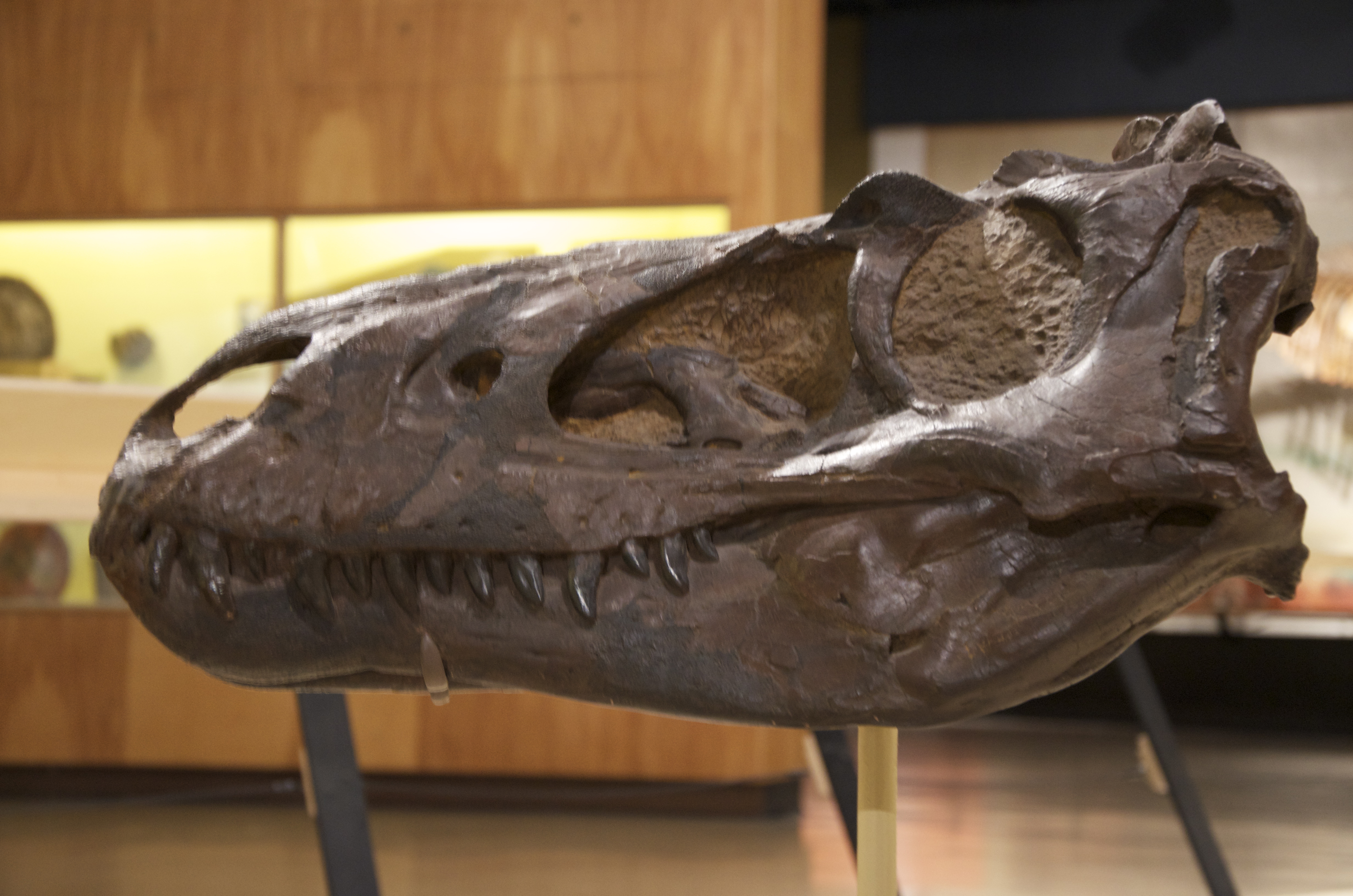
Holotype skull of "Gorgosaurus" (now Nanotyrannus) lancensis.

==== 1946 ====
- Gilmore described the new species Gorgosaurus lancensis.

=== 1950s ===
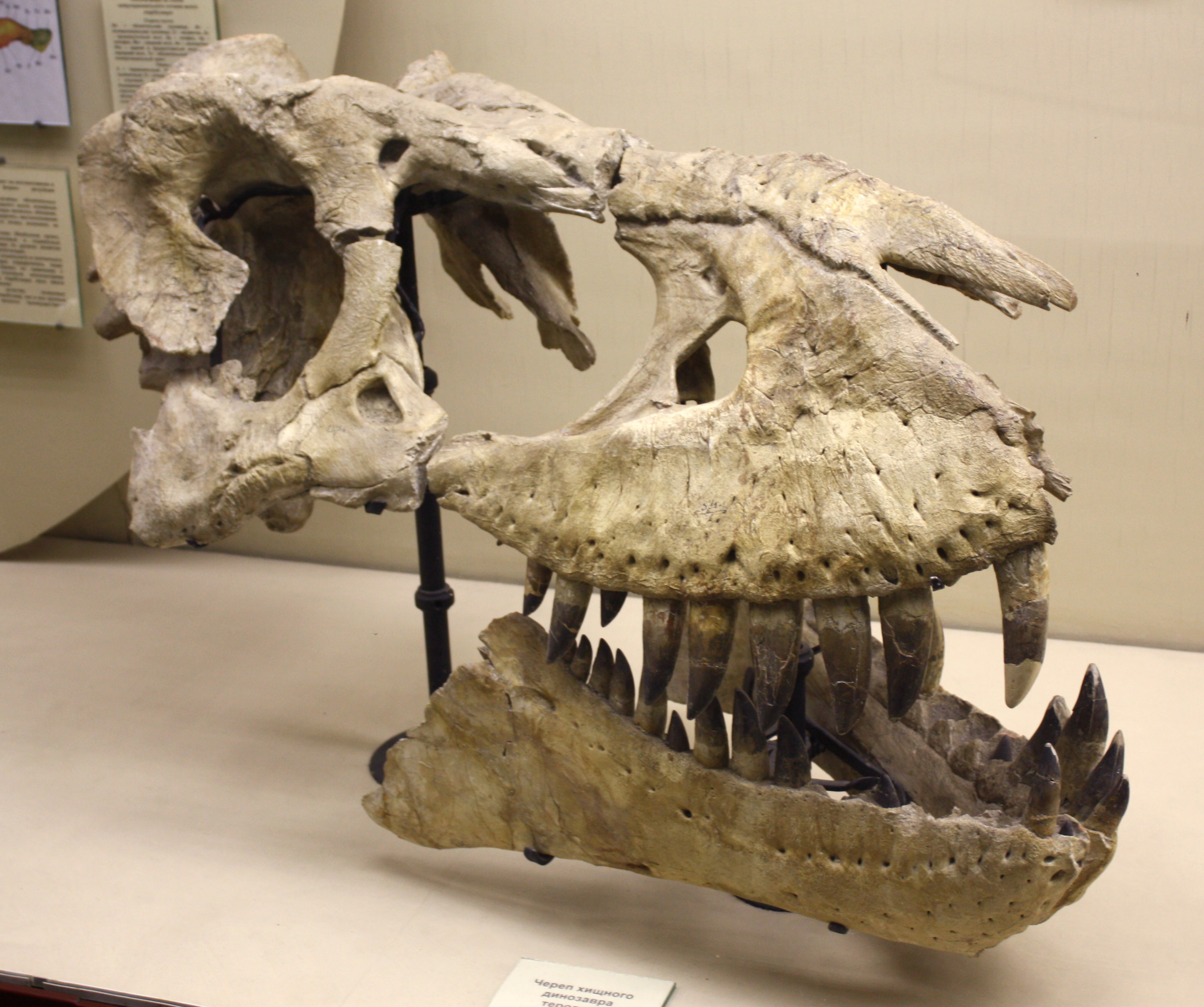
Holotype skull of Tarbosaurus bataar PIN 551-1, Museum of Paleontology, Moscow.

==== 1955 ====
- Colbert classified tyrannosaurs as carnosaurs.
- Evgeny Maleev described the new genus and species Tarbosaurus bataar. He also described the species T. efremovi. He also described the species Gorgosaurus lancinator.
- Maleev described the new species of Maleevosaurus, Albertosaurus, Aublysodon, Deinodon novojilovi.

==== 1956 ====
- Alfred Sherwood Romer classified tyrannosaurs as carnosaurs.

==== 1958 ====
- Young described the new genus and species Chingkankosaurus fragilis.

=== 1960s ===
==== 1964 ====
- Walker named the Tyrannosauroidea. He regarded tyrannosaurs as carnosaurs.

=== 1970s ===
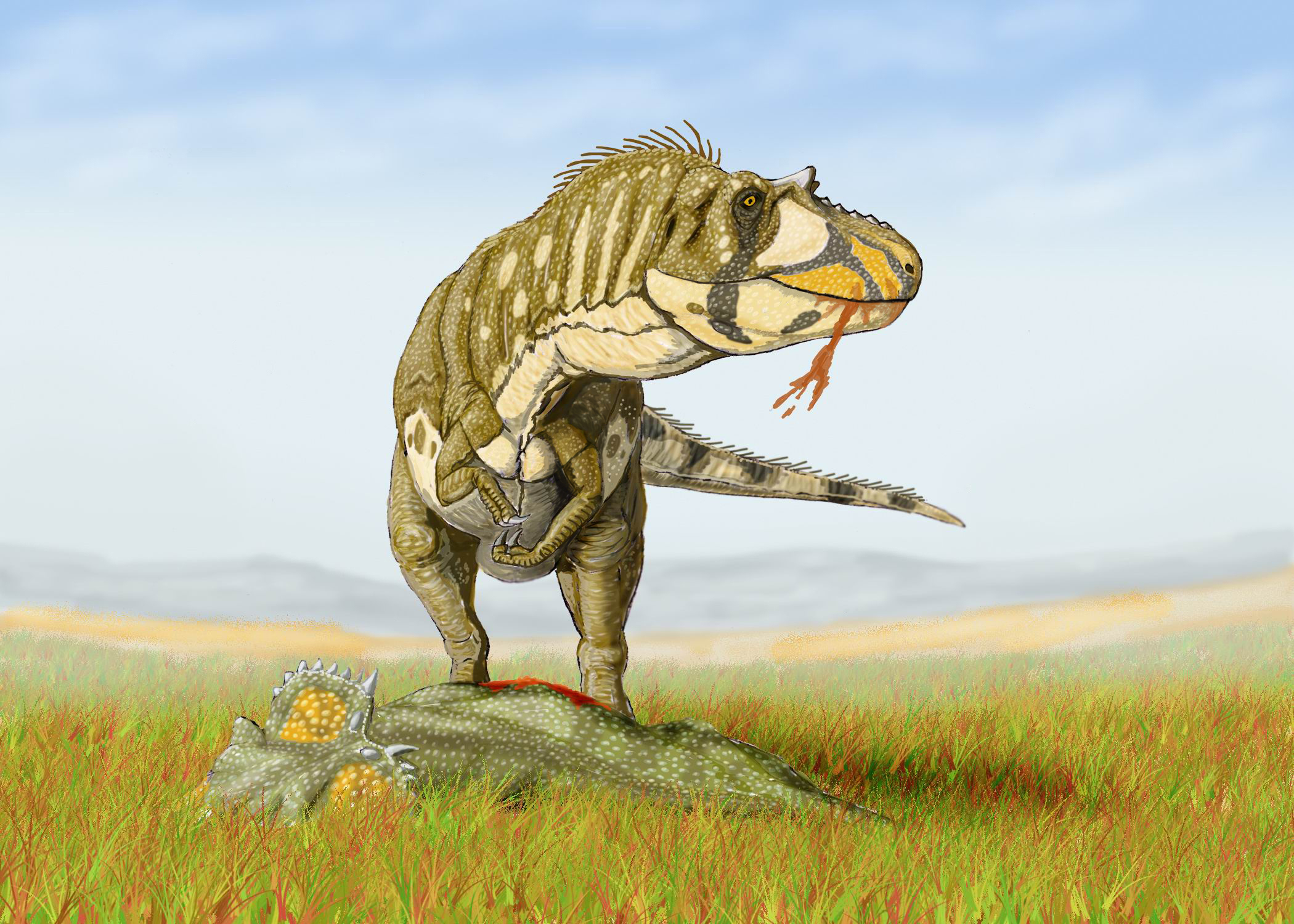
Artist's restoration of Daspletosaurus torosus.

==== 1970 ====
- Dale Russell described the new genus and species Daspletosaurus torosus. He classified it in the family Tyrannosauridae rather than the historical home of tyrannosaurs, the Deinodontidae, setting a trend among paleontologists that would see the latter familial name fall into disuse in favor of the former. He observed that Daspletosaurus and Gorgosaurus lived at the same time and place, while Daspletosaurus was less common. He also noticed that hadrosaurs and ceratopsians were both present in the same deposits, with ceratopsians being less common. He speculated that this parallel may have been due to niche partitioning between the tyrannosaurs as each specialized in prey, with the lighter built and more common Gorgosaurus feeding on hadrosaurs and the more rugged and less common Daspletosaurus specializing in the rarer and more dangerous ceratopsians. He noted that while adult tyrannosaurs may have fed on such large prey, very young individuals would be limited to quarry like birds, frogs, mammals, and small reptiles.
- Rodney Steel classified tyrannosaurs as carnosaurs.

==== 1974 ====
- Madsen described the new genus and species Stokesosaurus clevelandi. This is the oldest known tyrannosauroid.
- Maleev still classified tyrannosaurs in the family Deinodontidae.

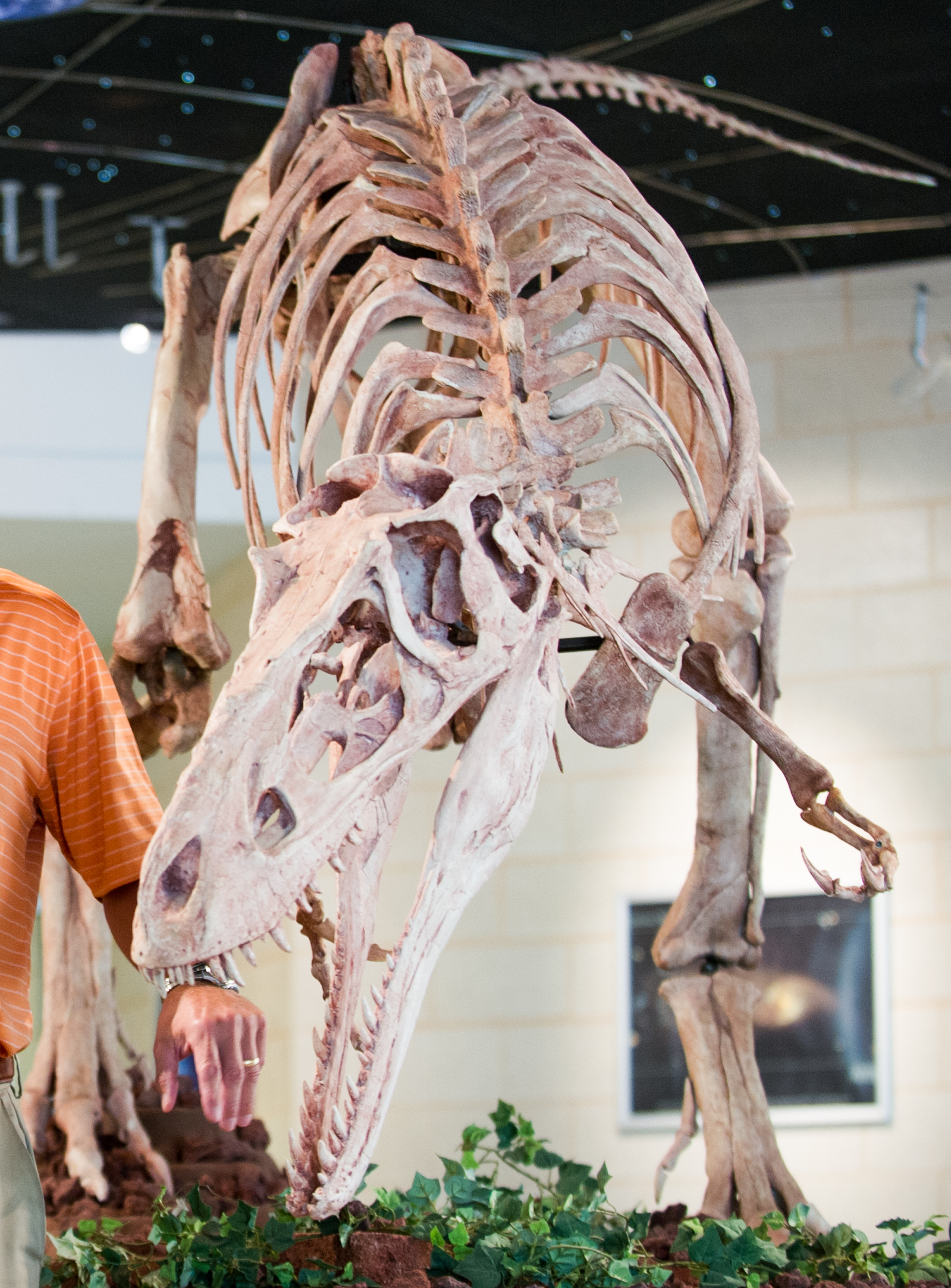
Skeletal mount of Alioramus remotus.

- Ralph Molnar described the new genus and species Labocania anomala.

==== 1976 ====
- Sergei Mikhailovich Kurzanov described the new genus and species Alioramus remotus as well as the new genus and species Itemirus medullaris.

==== 1977 ====
- Dong described the new genus and species Shanshanosaurus huoyanshanensis.

==== 1978 ====
- Paul Colinvaux interpreted tyrannosaurids as scavengers.

==== 1979 ====
- Dong described the new genus and species Tyrannosaurus luanchuanensis.

=== 1980s ===
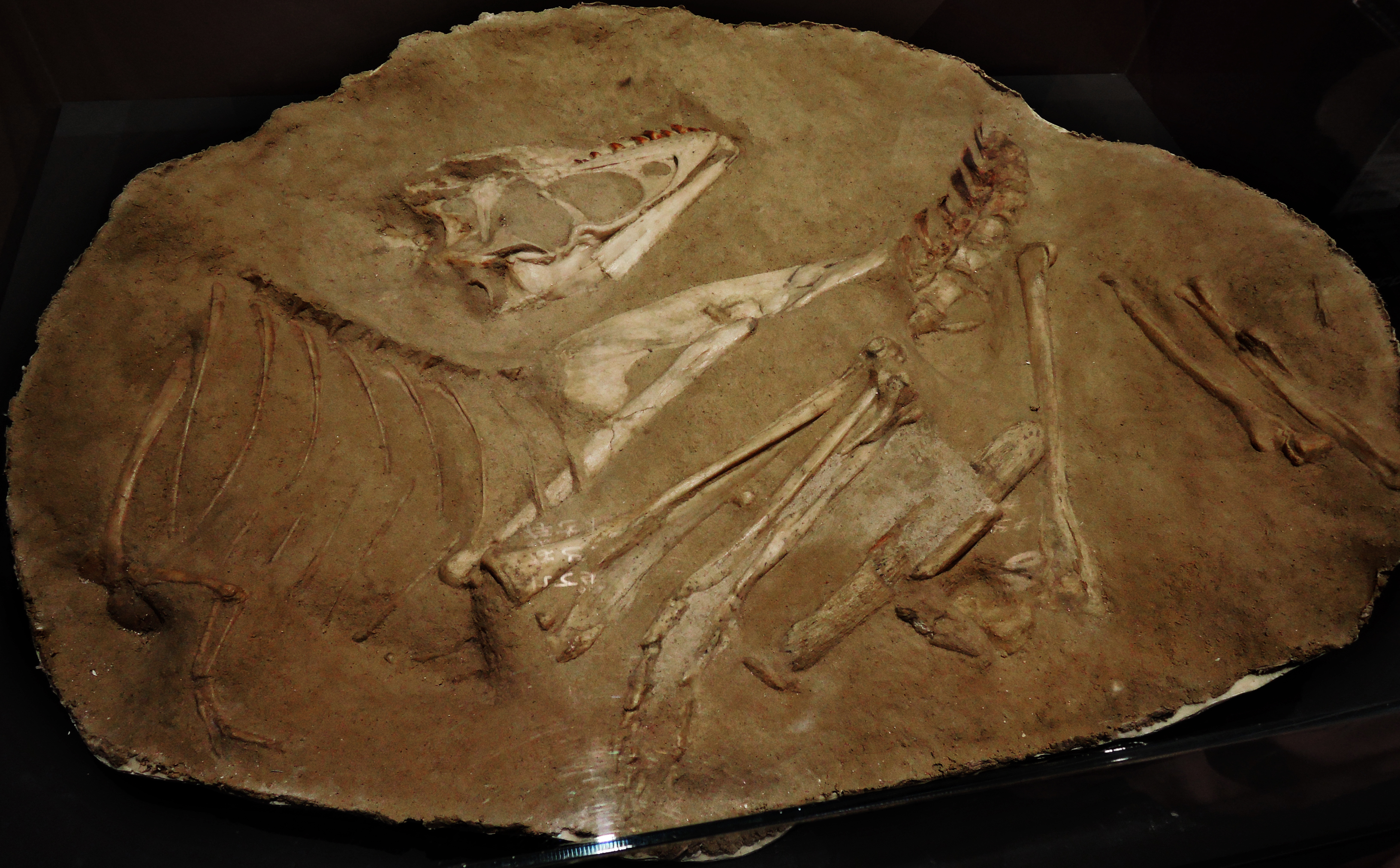
A juvenile Tarbosaurus.

==== 1980 ====
- Halszka Osmólska reported multiple Tarbosaurus of different life stages found preserved together in the same deposit.

==== 1981 ====
- Lambert Beverly Halstead and his wife Jennifer Middleton interpreted tyrannosaurids as scavengers.

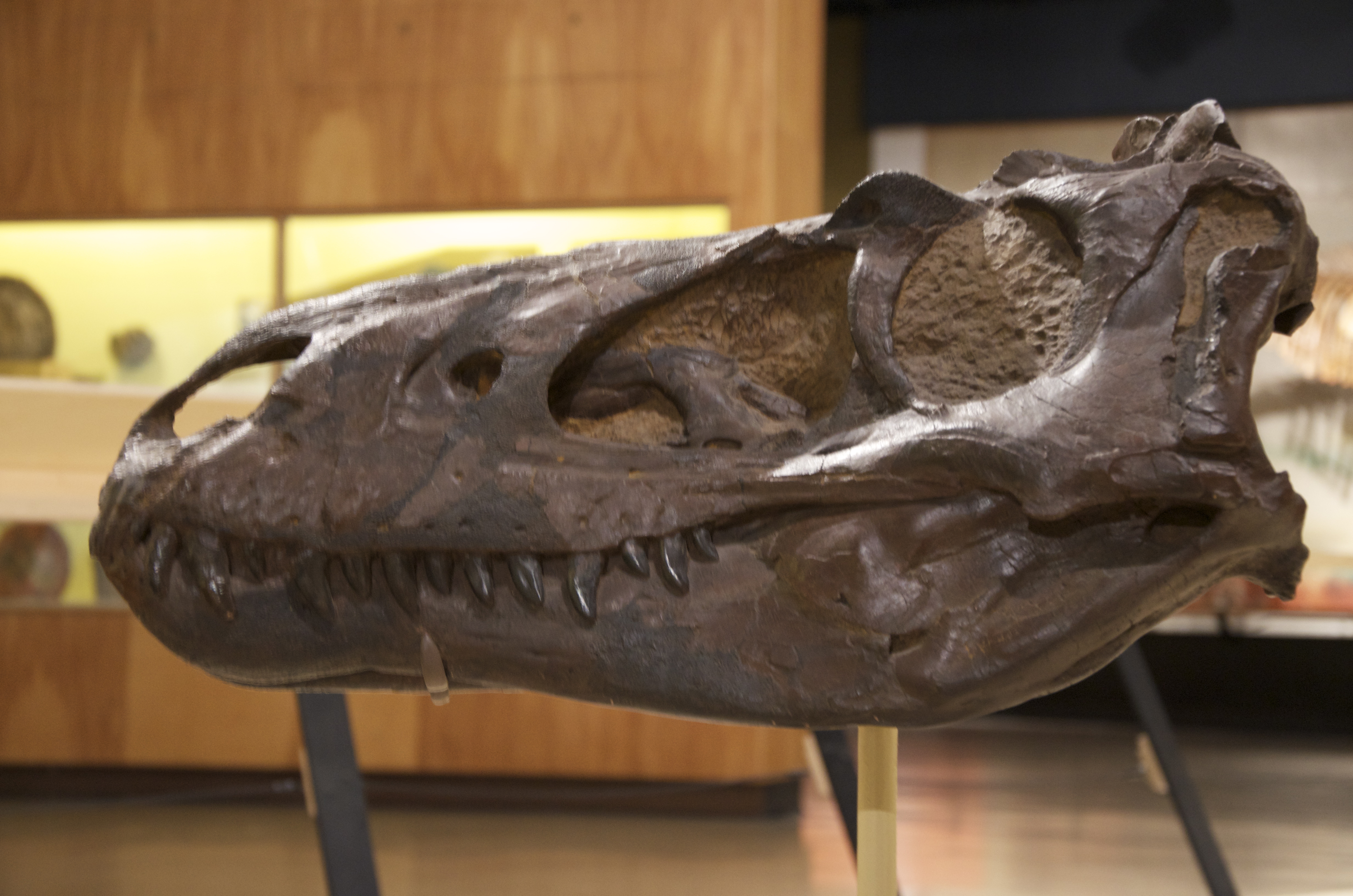
Holotype skull of Nanotyrannus lancensis.

==== 1983 ====
- Rinchen Barsbold interpreted tyrannosaurids as scavengers.

==== 1986 ====
- Jacques Gauthier classified tyrannosaurs as carnosaurs.
- Robert T. Bakker interpreted the "ornamentation" seen on the snouts and around the eyes of many tyrannosaurs were displays for other members of the same tyrannosaur species.

==== 1988 ====
- Bakker described the new genus Nanotyrannus lancensis to house the species Gorgosaurus lancensis.
- Gregory S. Paul described the new species Albertosaurus megagracilis and Aublysodon molnari.

=== 1990s ===
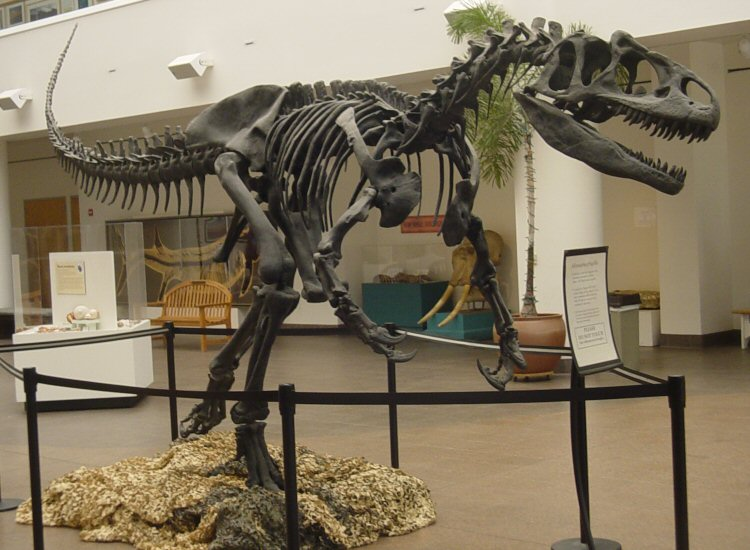
Tyrannosaurs had long been classified with carnosaurs like Allosaurus (pictured). In the 1990s, this consensus began to change.

==== 1990 ====
- José Bonaparte and others classified tyrannosaurs as carnosaurs.
- Molnar classified tyrannosaurs as carnosaurs.

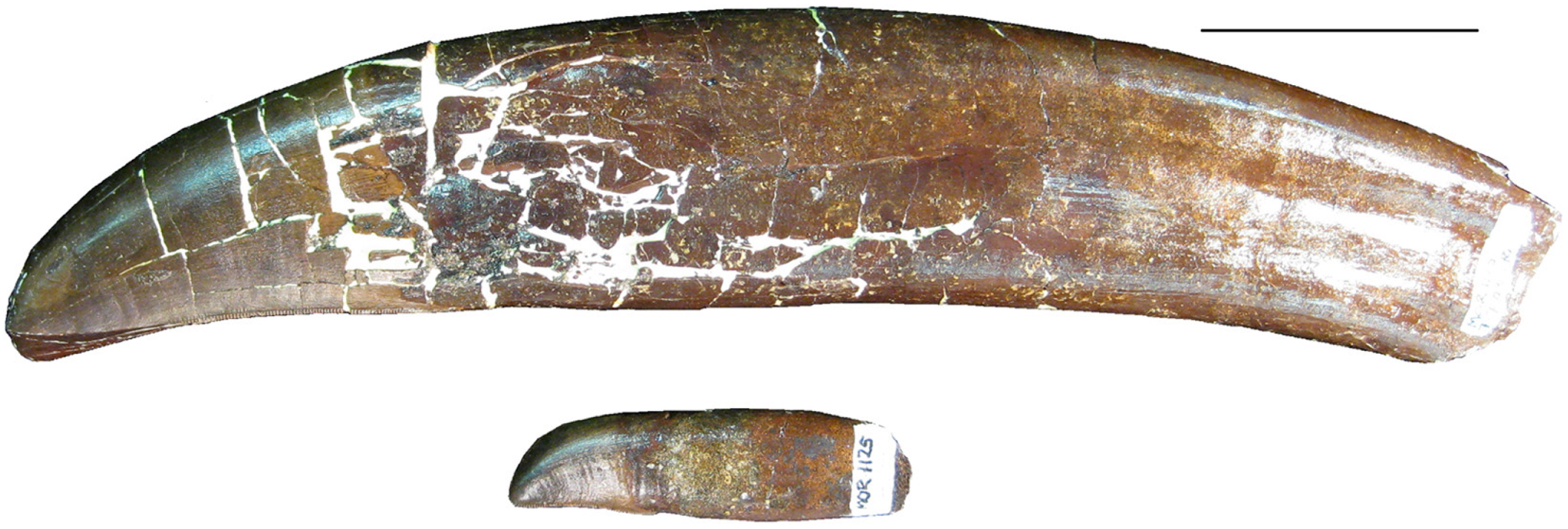
Paleontologists like Abler studied tyrannosaur tooth biomechanics (Tyrannosaurus teeth pictured) in the early 1990s.

- Sue, catalog name FMNH PR 2081, the largest and most complete T. rex skeleton found at the time, discovered on August 12, 1990 on the Cheyenne River Indian Reservation in South Dakota.

==== 1991 ====
- Farlow and others studied tyrannosaur tooth biomechanics, finding them to be more resistant to forces in both the front-to-back and side-to-side planes than the more blade-like teeth of other carnivorous dinosaurs.
- Scotty the T. rex is discovered near Eastend, Saskatchewan.

==== 1992 ====
- Kenneth Carpenter described the new genus Maleevosaurus.
- William Abler studied tyrannosaur tooth biomechanics. He concluded that the serrations on tyrannosaur teeth did not function like the serrations on a saw blade. Instead he thought the serrations may have caught pieces of rotting meat inside them, sustaining bacterial colonies that make its bite likely to transmit deadly infections to potential prey items. Similar use of decaying meat trapped in tooth serrations as a vector for infected prey had been reported in monitor lizards.
- Fernando Emilio Novas performed a phylogenetic analysis of the tyrannosauridae, finding tyrannosaurs to actually be coelurosaurs, as advocated by a few contrarian workers during the 1920s, rather than carnosaurs as had been generally supposed for decades. Novas found them equally related to the ornithomimosaurs and maniraptorans.

==== 1993 ====
- Bernardino Pérez Pérez-Moreno and others performed another phylogenetic analysis of the Tyrannosauridae and found additional support for reclassifying the family as coelurosaurs. They found that within the coelurosaurs, tyrannosaurs were arctometatarsalians. In other words, they were more closely related to the ostrich dinosaurs than to birds.
- Farlow found that the ancient ecology of tyrannosaur habitats were inconsistent with the idea that they were scavengers.
- Horner and Donald Lessem interpreted tyrannosaurids as scavengers.

==== 1994 ====
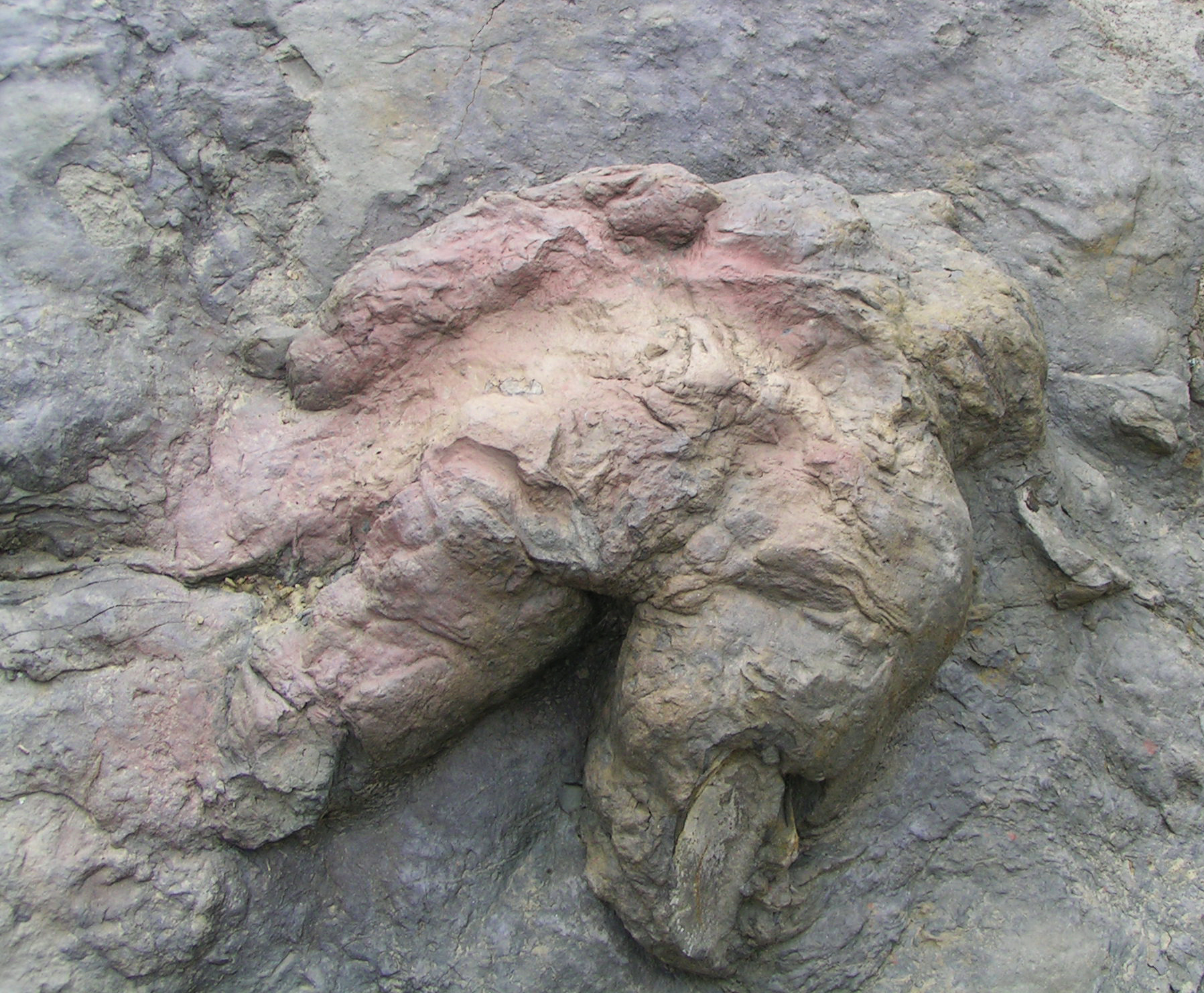
Lockley and Hunt reported a possible T. rex footprint in 1994.

- Pérez-Moreno and others performed another phylogenetic analysis of the Tyrannosauridae and found additional support for reclassifying the family as coelurosaurs. They found tyrannosaurids to lie outside of the Maniraptoriformes. In other words, they are less closely related to birds than the ostrich dinosaurs are.
- Thomas Holtz performed another phylogenetic analysis of the Tyrannosauridae and found additional support for reclassifying the family as coelurosaurs. He found that within the coelurosaurs, tyrannosaurs were arctometatarsalians. In other words, they were more closely related to the ostrich dinosaurs than to birds.
- Horner interpreted tyrannosaurids as scavengers.
- Martin Lockley and Hunt described a possible Tyrannosaurus footprint.

==== 1995 ====
- Emily B. Giffin observed that the brachial plexus of the tyrannosaurid neural canal was smaller than those of other theropods, suggesting that tyrannosaurids really did have reduced forelimb function.
- Farlow and others calculated that an adult T. rex running at 20 m/s or faster would sustain fatal injuries if it tripped, suggesting that they didn't actually run that fast.

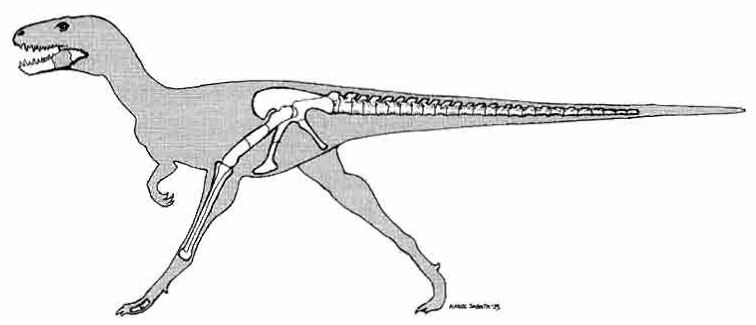
The known skeletal elements of Bagaraatan ostromi.

- Holtz observed that tyrannosaurids had the longest limbs relative to their body size of any theropod dinosaurs apart from the ostrich dinosaurs and a small, slender ceratosaur called Elaphrosaurus. Although the ostrich dinosaur on average had relatively longer limbs overall, the ratios of femur length to the length of the tibia and fibula were actually very close between the smaller tyrannosaurs and the largest ostrich dinosaurs. Holtz found ostrich dinosaurs and tyrannosaurs to have other traits of the hindlimb in common as well. Both groups had a pinched third metatarsal, called an arctometatarsus, that strengthened the foot. Holtz concluded that these traits indicated that tyrannosaurids were among the best adapted for running of all carnivorous dinosaurs.

==== 1996 ====
- Osmólska described the new genus and species Bagaraatan ostromi.
- Gregory Erickson and Kenneth Olson reported the existence of ornithischian bones with T. rex bite marks.
- Erickson and Olson others calculated the bite force of T. rex, finding it to have some of the strongest jaws of any carnivorous vertebrate. By contrast, other carnivorous dinosaurs like Allosaurus had relatively weak jaws.

==== 1997 ====
- Richard Cifelli and others reported teeth from Utah that exhibited the distinctive thickening characterizing tyrannosaurid teeth that date back to the Albian-Cenomanian boundary. As such, they were the oldest known tyrannosaurid teeth.
- Kirkland and others reported teeth from Utah that exhibited the distinctive thickening characterizing tyrannosaurid teeth that date back to the Albian-Cenomanian boundary. As such, they were the oldest known tyrannosaurid teeth.
- Sereno concluded that the evolutionary history of tyrannosaurids suggested a relatively complex history of biogeographic dispersal between Asia and North America.
- Horner and Dobb interpreted tyrannosaurids as scavengers.

==== 1998 ====
- Sereno performed another phylogenetic analysis of the Tyrannosauridae and found additional support for reclassifying the family as coelurosaurs. He defined the tyrannosauridae as all tyrannosauroids closer to Tyrannosaurus than to Alectrosaurus, Aublysodon, or Nanotyrannus.
- Catherine Forster and others performed another phylogenetic analysis which provided further support for the idea that tyrannosaurs are coelurosaurs, but less closely related to birds than ornithomimosaurs.
- Peter Makovicky and Hans-Dieter Sues performed another phylogenetic analysis which provided further support for the idea that tyrannosaurs are coelurosaurs, but less closely related to birds than ornithomimosaurs.

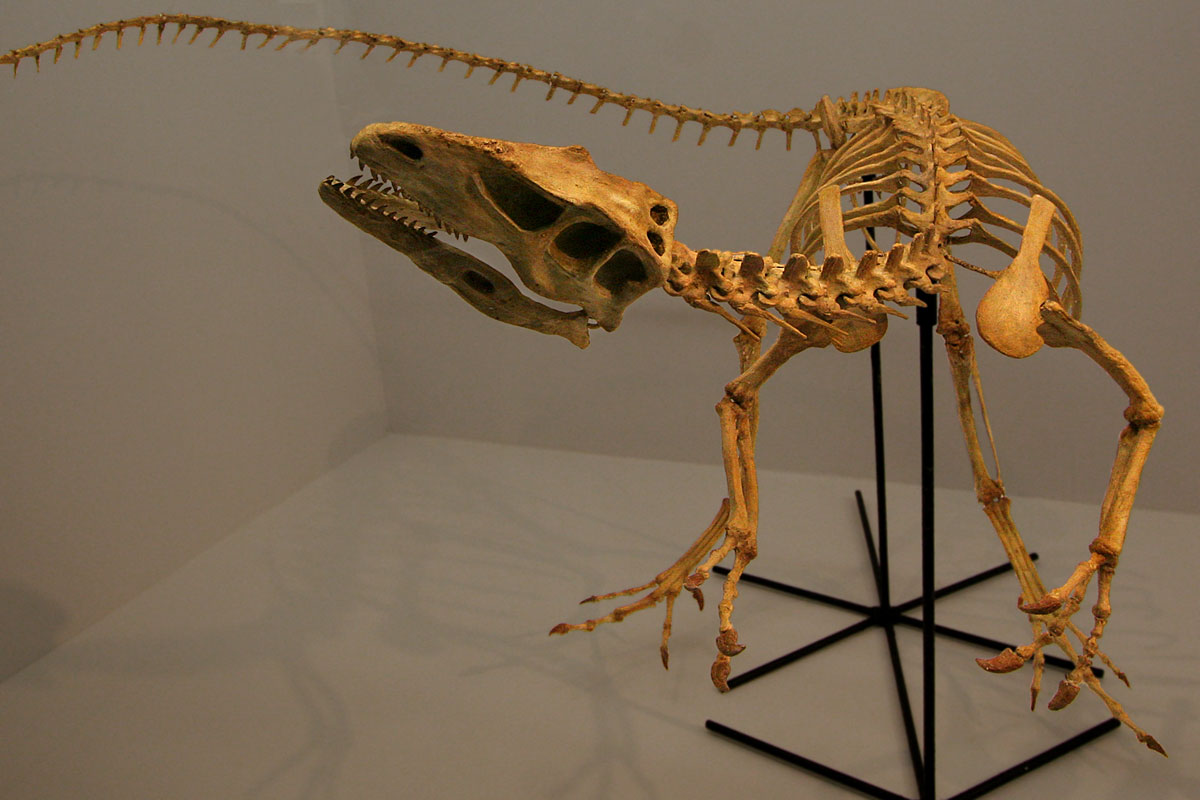
Skeletal mount of Santanaraptor placidus.

- Karen Chin and others reported a coprolite preserved in the Frenchman Formation of Saskatchewan that may have been left behind by Tyrannosaurus. The coprolite contained the partially digested bone fragments of the ornithischian dinosaurs it fed upon. These bones composed 30–50% of its total volume.
- Holtz found that within the coelurosaurs, tyrannosaurs were arctometatarsalians. In other words, they were more closely related to the ornithomimosaurs than to birds.

==== 1999 ====
- Alexander Kellner described the new genus and species Santanaraptor placidus. Santanaraptor is a possible tyrannosauroid. If so, it is the only known member of the group that would have inhabited the super continent of Gondwana.
- Thomas Carr argued that Nanotyrannus was actually just a young Tyrannosaurus. He noticed that adult T. rex had fewer and more widely spaced teeth in the front tip of their jaws than juvenile T. rex or tyrannosaurs of other species, suggesting differences in feeding within and between tyrannosaur species.
- Sereno performed another phylogenetic analysis of the Tyrannosauridae. He found that tyrannosaurs were closer to maniraptorans than Ornithomimosaurs were. He called the Tyrannosaur-Maniraptoran clade "Tyrannoraptora".
- Günter P. Wagner and Gauthier performed a phylogenetic analysis of the tyrannosaurs but found them equally related to the ornithomimosaurs and maniraptorans.

== 21st century ==
=== 2000s ===
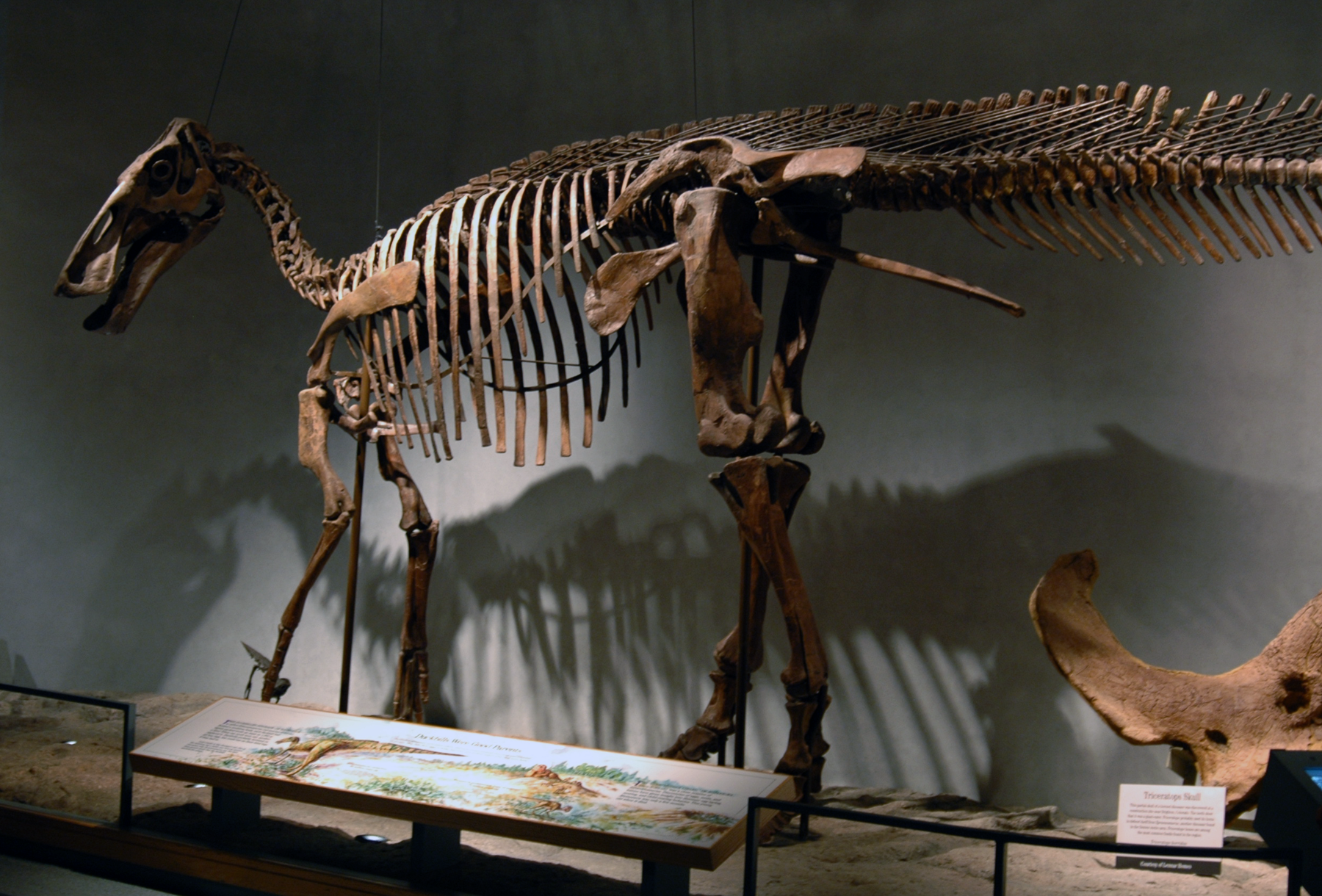
Edmontosaurus annectens tail vertebrae have been preserved with partially healed T. rex bite marks.

==== 2000 ====
- Oliver Walter Mischa Rauhut reported the presence of Stokesosaurus or an extremely close relative in Portugal.
- Carpenter reported a partially healed bite wound on a tail vertebra of an Edmontosaurus annectens, the size and shape of which suggested that it had been inflicted by Tyrannosaurus rex.
- Carr and Williamson observed that tyrannosaurines were the most common type of tyrannosaurid in the southwestern US during the Campanian and Maastrichtian.
- Phil Currie reported the discovery of at least nine Albertosaurus of different age groups preserved together in the same deposit. He speculated that if these animals were part of a social group, that members of different ages might perform different tasks in the course of a hunt. This interpretation derives by analogy from the behavior of modern pack hunting carnivorous mammals.
- Darren Tanke and Currie reported that many specimens of Gorgosaurus and Daspletosaurus preserve evidence of bite wounds inflicted by members of the same tyrannosaur species. This is suggestive of face biting behavior of the sort seen in many kinds of modern predator like crocodilians, monitor lizards, and wolves.

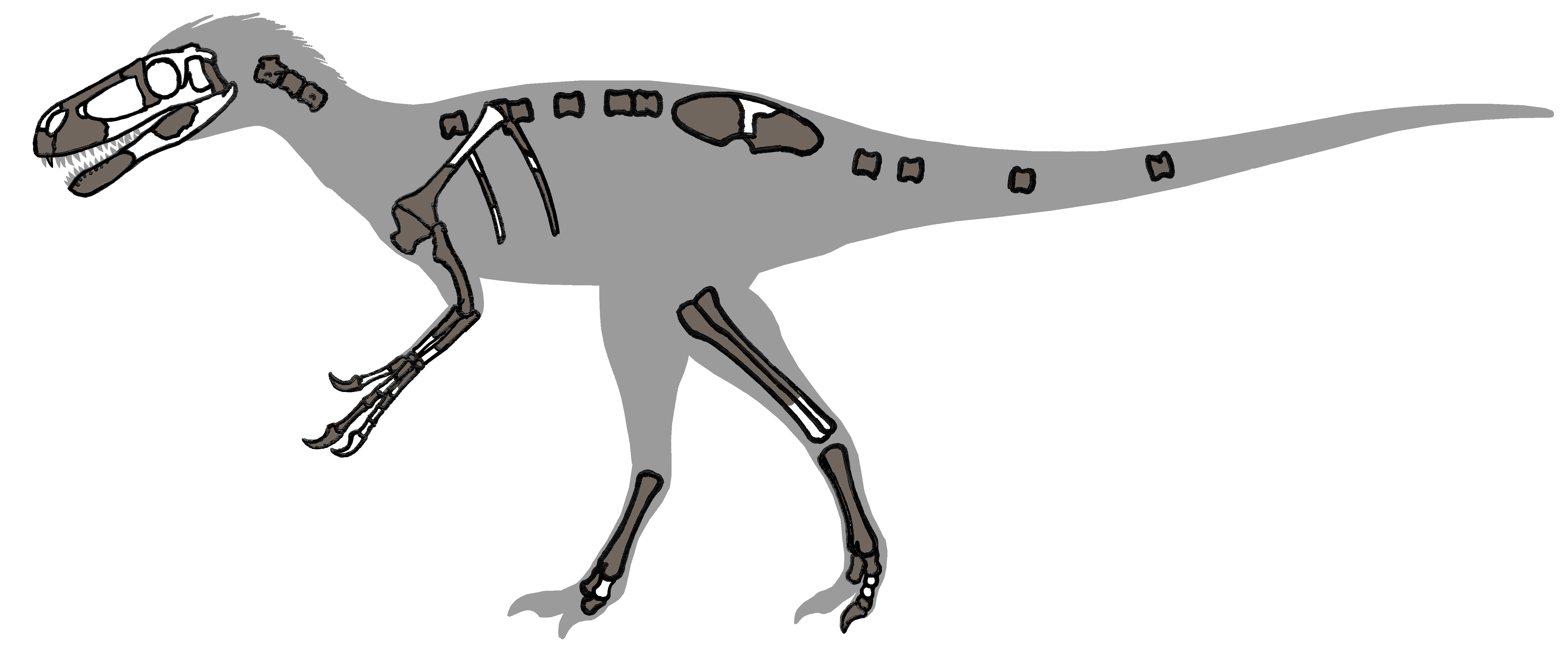
Known skeletal elements of Eotyrannus lengi.

- Mark Norell and others found tyrannosaurids to lie outside of the Maniraptoriformes. In other words, they are less closely related to birds than the ostrich dinosaurs are.

==== 2001 ====
- Stephen Hutt and others described the new genus and species Eotyrannus lengi.
- Kenneth Carpenter and Matt Smith published a detailed description of the osteology and biomechanics of T. rex forelimbs. They concluded that T. rex arms were actually rather strong, but with a much smaller range of motion than other carnivorous dinosaurs like Allosaurus and Deinonychus. They concluded that while the arms of Tyrannosaurus would have been useless for actually killing prey, they may have been used to hold on to prey while the tyrannosaur killed it with bites. They dismissed notions that the forelimbs were useless or that Tyrannosaurus rex was an obligate scavenger. This study was the complete description of Tyrannosaurus forelimbs in the scientific literature.
- Thomas Lehman observed that during the Campanian and Maastrichtian the distribution of albertosaurines and tyrannosaurines was strongly correlated with the distributions of their respective ornithischian prey.

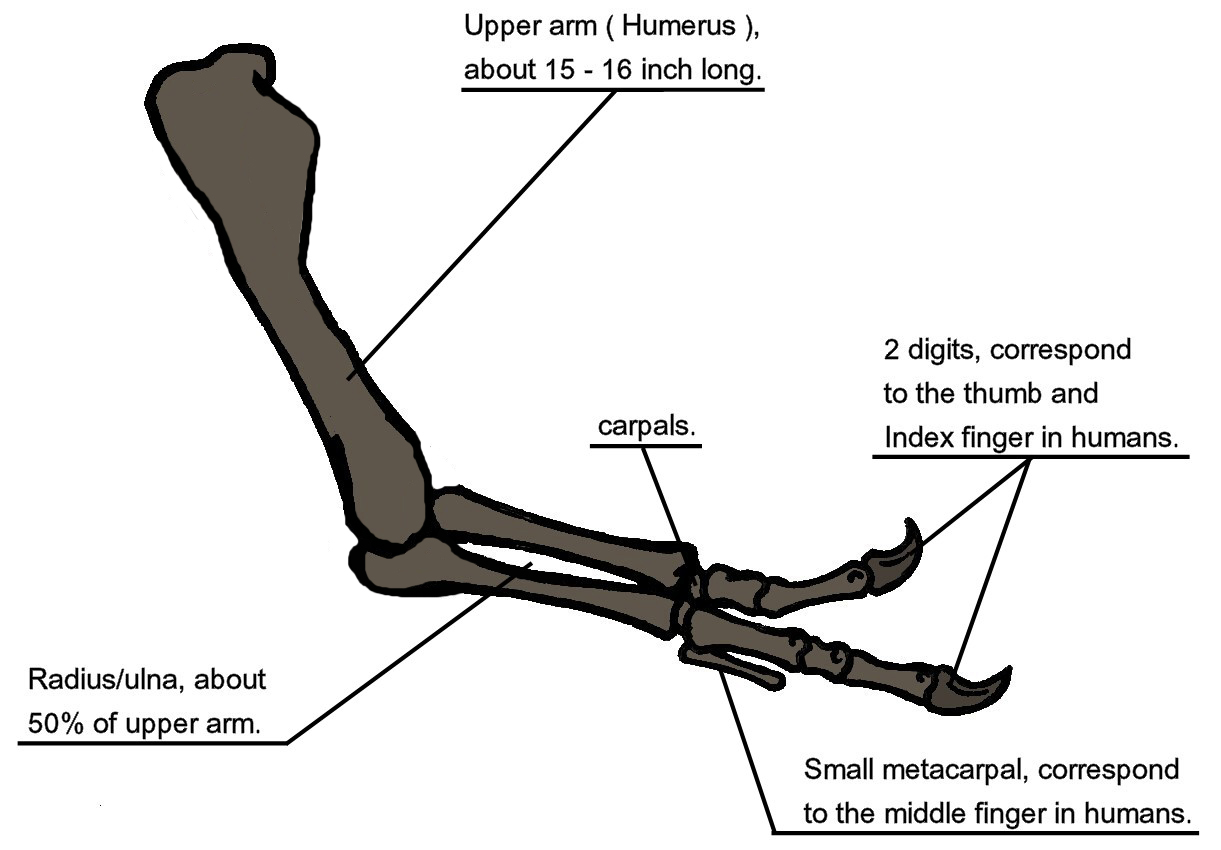
Diagram of T. rex forelimb anatomy.

- David Varrichio and others reported a Daspletosaurus specimen from the Two Medicine Formation of Montana. This specimen notably preserved the contents of the animal's gut when it died, including fragments of bone from young ornithischian dinosaurs.
- Foster and others observed that no other theropod inhabiting Asia or North America during the Campanian or Maastrichtian achieved a body size within "two orders of magnitude" of contemporary tyrannosaurs.~paleobio133-134~ They further speculated that this gap in body size may be attributable to juvenile tyrannosaurs occupying the ecological niches once exploited by other medium-to-large sized theropods.
- Holtz found that within the coelurosaurs, tyrannosaurs were arctometatarsalians; meaning they were closer to ornithomimosaurs than to birds.

Thomas R. Holtz, Jr. published a cladistic analysis of the Tyrannosauridae. Holtz defined the Tyrannosauridae in his analysis as "all descendants of the most recent common ancestor of Tyrannosaurus and Aublysodon." He concluded that the Tyrannosauridae had two subfamilies, a more primitive Aublysodontinae and the Tyrannosaurinae. He defined the former as "Aublysodon and all taxa sharing a more recent common ancestor with it than with Tyrannosaurus."

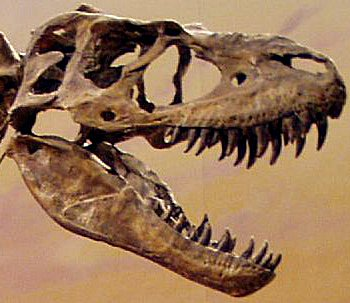
Jaws and teeth of Gorgosaurus.

He observed that these dinosaurs were distinguished by their unserrated premaxillary teeth. The Tyrannosaurinae he defined as "Tyrannosaurus and all taxa sharing a more recent common ancestor with it than with Aublysodon."

Holtz considered these definitions only tentative due to the scant remains representing most taxa in the Aublysodontinae. Holtz also noted that the lack of serrations on aublyodontines' premaxillary teeth could have been caused by tooth wear in life, postmortem abrasion, or digestion. Alternatively "Aublysodontine"-type teeth could be from an ontogenetic stage or sexual morph of another kind of tyrannosaur. Holtz also expressed the taxonomic opinion that Nanotyrannus lancensis was a juvenile T. rex. The results of his phylogenetic analysis of the Tyrannosauridae are reproduced below:

Cladograms of tyrannosaurs from Holtz 2001

Tyrannosauridae

- Tyrannosauridae
  - Tyrannosaurinae
    - - - - - Tarbosaurus bataar
            - Tyrannosaurus rex
          - Daspletosaurus torosus
          - Daspletosaurus horneri
        - - Gorgosaurus libratus
          - Albertosaurus sarcophagus
      - Shanshanosaurus
    - Alioramus remotus
  - Aublysodontinae
    - Aublysodon molnari
    - Bistahieversor sealeyi
    - Alectrosaurus olseni
- Siamotyrannus isanensis

Holtz's new cladogram of the tyrannosauridae, including Siamotyrannus isanensis and Shanshanosaurus.

Tyrannosauridae

- Tyrannosauridae
  - Tyrannosaurinae
    - - - - Tyrannosaurus bataar
          - Tyrannosaurus rex
        - Daspletosaurus torosus
        - Daspletosaurus horneri
      - Albertosaurus sarcophagus
      - Gorgosaurus libratus
    - Alioramus remotus
  - Aublysodontinae
    - Aublysodon molnari
    - Bistahieversor sealeyi
    - Alectrosaurus olseni

Holtz's strict-consensus cladogram of the tyrannosauridae, excluding Siamotyrannus isanensis and Shanshanosaurus.

- William L. Abler studied tyrannosaur tooth serration biomechanics. He observed that Albertosaurus tooth serrations are so thin that they are practically a shallow crack in the tooth. However, at the base of each serration is round void called an ampulla which would have functioned to distribute force over a larger surface area, hindering the ability of the "crack" formed by the serration to propagate through the tooth.
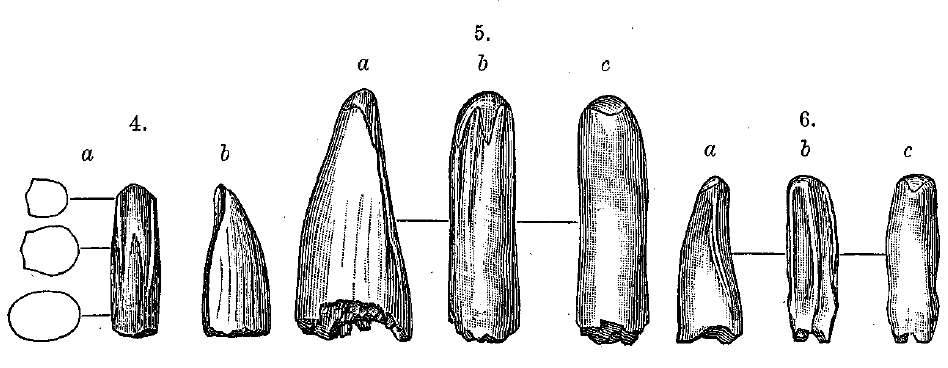
  Teeth of Aublysodon.
  This form resembles techniques used by guitar makers to "impart alternating regions of flexibility and rigidity" to wood. As a proof of concept demonstrated that a plexiglass bar bearing regular incisions ending in drilled holes was more than 25% stronger than one with only regularly placed incisions. Abler interpreted tyrannosaurid teeth as holdfasts for pulling meat off a body, rather than knife-like cutting implements.
- A. R. Jacobsen published a description of a dentary referred to Saurornitholestes with tooth marks. The specimen was preserved in the Dinosaur Park Formation. Although a specific identification cannot be made, the shape of the preserved serration marks implicate a juvenile individual of one of the formation's tyrannosaurids, like Gorgosaurus, Daspletosaurus, or Aublysodon. All of the marks on the jawbone seem to have been left by the same animal because the serration marks all share the same morphology.

==== 2002 ====
- Brochu observed that the only distinguishing character of Aublysodon was the lack of serrations on its teeth, and that this condition might actually be due to damage sustained after the death of the animal. As such, he deemed that Aublysodon made a poor choice of anchor taxon for the Tyrannosauridae.
- Farlow and Holtz published a study concluding that the ancient ecology of tyrannosaur habitats and morphology of tyrannosaur bodies were inconsistent with the idea that they were scavengers.
- Holtz published a study concluding that the ancient ecology of tyrannosaur habitats and morphology of tyrannosaur bodies were inconsistent with the idea that they were scavengers. He also suggested that the tyrannosaur skull was subjected to greater torsional forces hunting and/or feeding than the skulls of other large carnivorous dinosaurs like allosaurs and ceratosaurs. He interpreted the breadth of the tyrannosaur skull and high development of its secondary palate as adaptations for enduring these forces. He theorized that tyrannosaurids exploited a similar hunting tactic to modern wolves and hyenas by running after prey and attacking it with their jaws. This tactic would distinguish tyrannosaurid hunting behavior from that of modern big cats, who depend more heavily on their forelimbs to take down prey.
- Carrano and Hutchinson tried to reconstruct the life musculature of T. rex.
- Hutchinson and Garcia used the reconstruction of T. rex musculature produced by Carrano and Hutchinson to ascertain its running abilities. They found that T. rex was not muscular enough for its body size to run quickly.
- Hunt coined the name "Fusinasus".

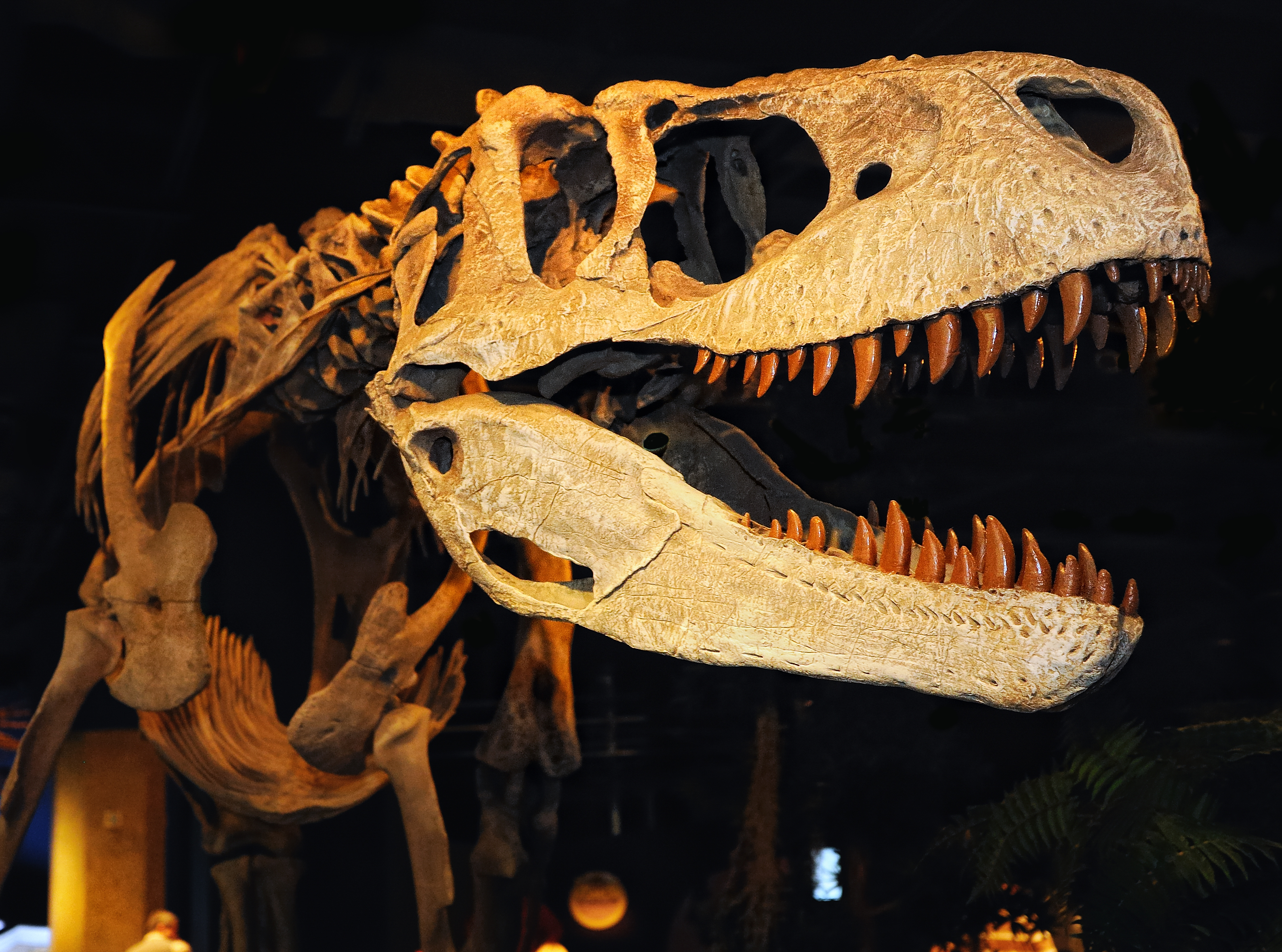
Skeletal mount of Appalachiosaurus.

==== 2003 ====
- Currie interpreted Nanotyrannus lancensis as a juvenile T. rex. Currie argued that the type specimen of Alectrosaurus olseni was too incomplete to ascertain its position in the tyrannosaur family tree.
- Rauhut described the new genus and species Aviatyrannis.

==== 2004 ====
- Xu and others described the new genus and species Dilong paradoxus.

==== 2005 ====
- T. D. Carr, T. E. Williamson, D. R. Schwimmer described the new genus and species Appalachiosaurus.

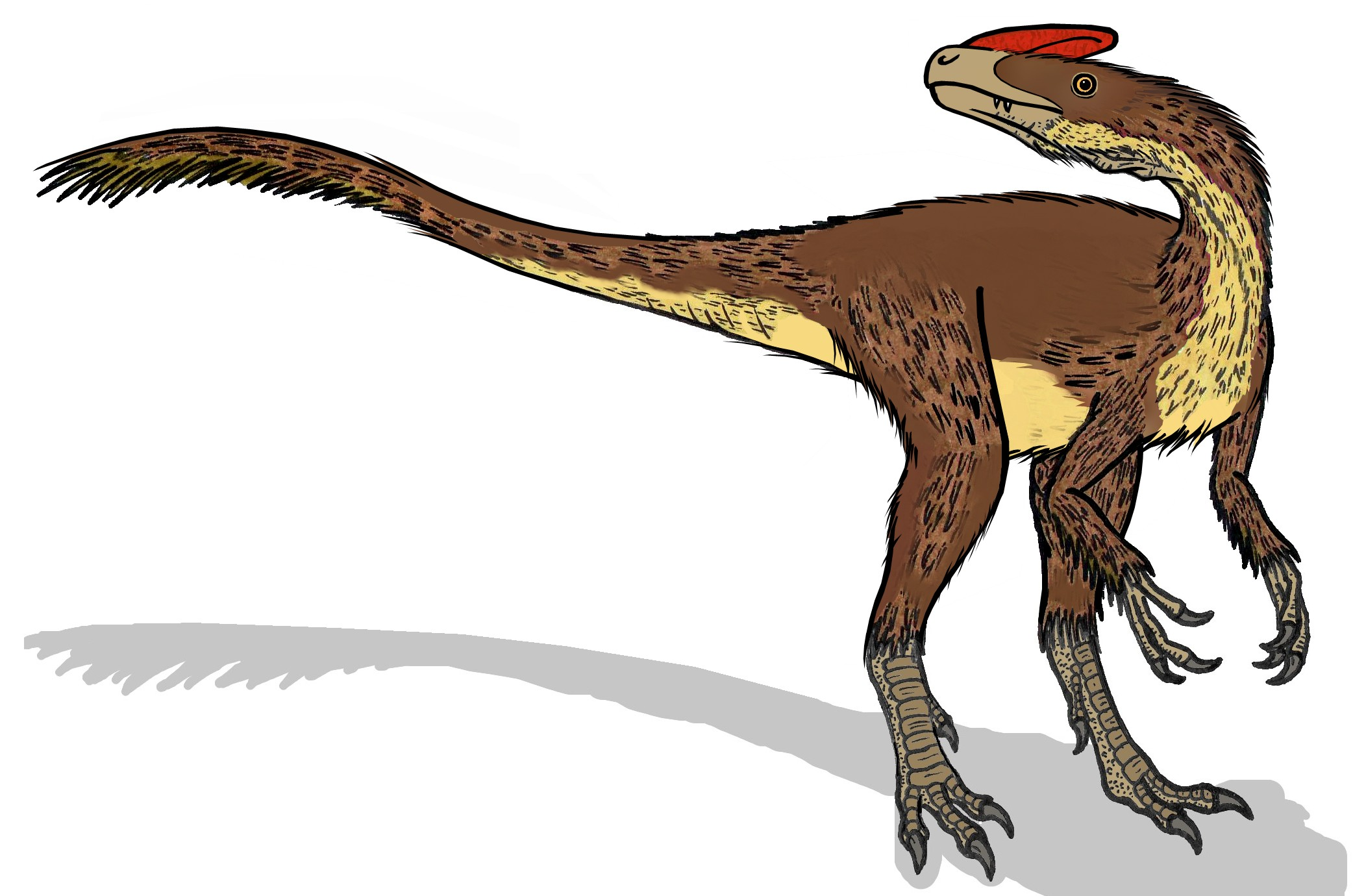
Artist's restoration of Guanlong.

- K. Carpenter, C. Miles, and K. Cloward described the new genus and species Tanycolagreus.

==== 2006 ====
- Xu and others described the new genus and species Guanlong.

==== 2009 ====
- Sereno et al. described the new genus and species Raptorex.
- Q. Ji, S.-A. Ji, and L.-J. Zhang described the new genus and species Sinotyrannus.

=== 2010s ===
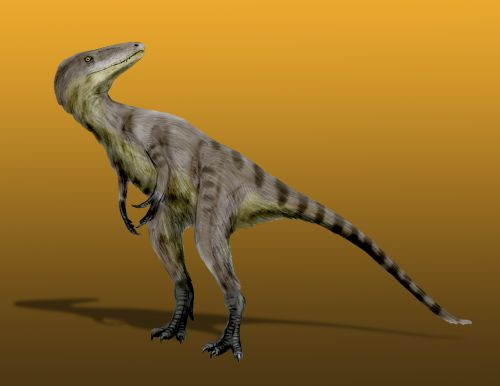
Artist's restoration of Xiongguanlong.

==== 2010 ====
- Carr and Williamson described the new genus and species Bistahieversor sealeyi.
- Averianov and others, described the new genus and species Kileskus aristotocus.
- Li and others, described the new genus and species Xiongguanlong baimoensis.

==== 2011 ====
- Carr and others described the new genus and species Teratophoneus curriei.

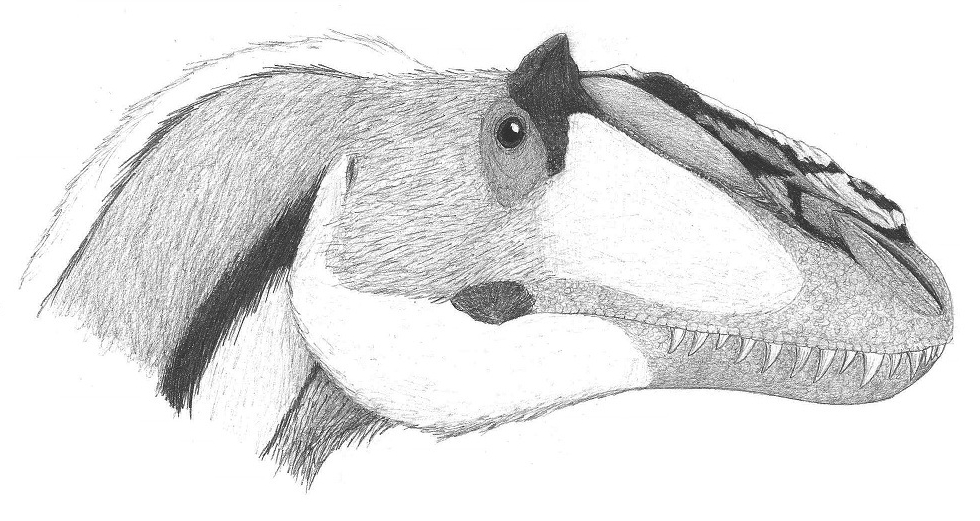
Artist's restoration of Yutyrannus.

- Hone and others described the new genus and species Zhuchengtyrannus magnus.

==== 2012 ====
- Xu and others described the new genus and species Yutyrannus huali.

==== 2013 ====
- Brusatte and Benson described the new genus and species Juratyrant langhami, which was formerly considered a species of Stokesosaurus.
- Loewen and others described the new genus and species Lythronax argestes.

Cladogram of tyrannosaurs from Loewen et al. 2013

- Tyrannosauroidea
  - Proceratosauridae
    - - Proceratosaurus bradleyi
      - Kileskus aristotocus
      - Guanlong wucaii
    - - Sinotyrannus kazuoensis
      - - Juratyrant langhami
        - Stokesosaurus clevelandi
  - - Dilong paradoxus
    - - Eotyrannus lengi
      - - Bagaraatan ostromi
        - - Raptorex kriegsteini
          - - Dryptosaurus aquilunguis
            - - - Alectrosaurus olseni
                - Xiongguanlong baimoensis
              - - Appalachiosaurus montgomeriensis
                - - - Alioramus altai
                    - Alioramus remotus
                  - Tyrannosauridae

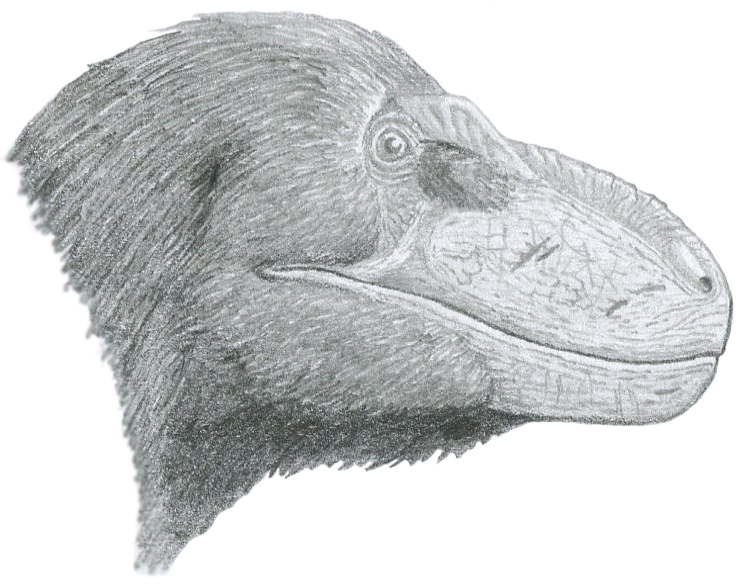
Artist's restoration of Nanuqsaurus.

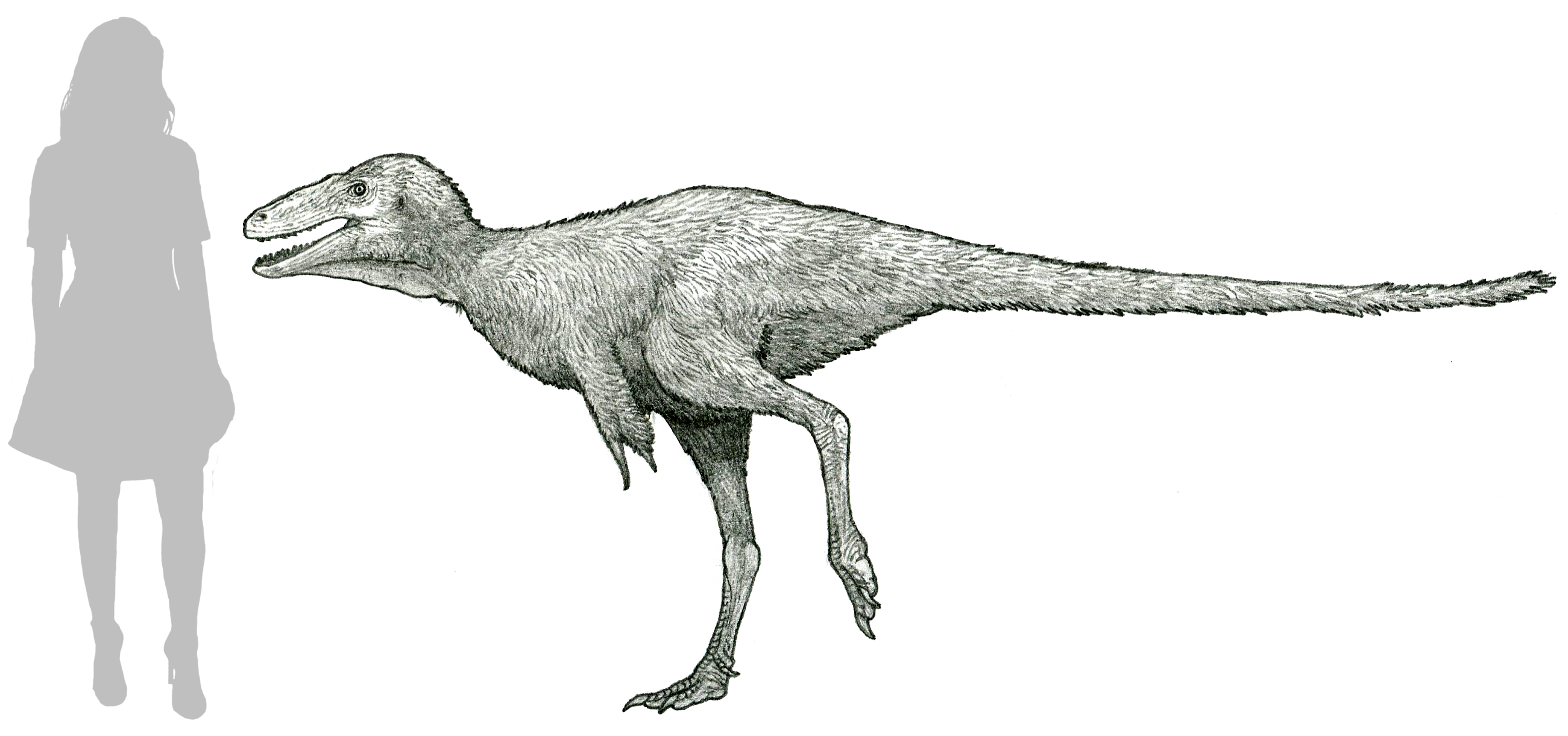
Artist's restoration of Moros intrepidus.

==== 2014 ====
- Fiorillo and Tykoski described the new genus and species Nanuqsaurus hoglundi.
- Lü Junchang and others described the new genus and species Qianzhousaurus sinensis.

==== 2015 ====
- The National Geographic Channel aired a documentary, T. rex Autopsy. Described more accurately as a thought experiment, it depicted four scientists, among them Steven Brusatte autopsying a life-size model of Tyrannosaurus rex.

==== 2016 ====
- Brusatte and others described the new genus and species Timurlengia euotica.

==== 2017 ====
- Brusatte and others described the new species Daspletosaurus horneri.
- Chan-gyu Yun erected the new genus Teihivenator for the species "Laelaps" macropus.

==== 2018 ====
- McDonald and others described the new genus and species Dynamoterror dynastes.

==== 2019 ====
- Zanno and others described the new genus and species Moros intrepidus.
- The first neurocranial and paleoneurological description of Dilong paradoxus, comparing it with large tyrannosaurids, will be published by Kundrát et al. (2019).
- A study on the agility and turning capability of tyrannosaurids and other large theropods is published by Snively et al. (2019), who argue that tyrannosaurids could turn with greater agility, thus pivoting more quickly, than other large theropods, which enhanced their ability to pursue and subdue prey.
- A study on the tooth replacement patterns in tyrannosaurid theropods, as indicated by data from a juvenile specimen of Tarbosaurus bataar, will be published by Hanai & Tsuihiji (2019).
- A study on the complexity and modularity of the skull of Tyrannosaurus rex is published by Werneburg et al. (2019).
- Traces preserved on a tail vertebra of a hadrosaurid dinosaur from the Upper Cretaceous Hell Creek Formation (Montana, United States) are described by Peterson & Daus (2019), who interpret their finding as feeding traces produced by a late-stage juvenile Tyrannosaurus rex.
- A large specimen of Tyrannosaurus rex (RSM P2523.8) with an estimated body mass exceeding other known T. rex specimens and representatives of all other gigantic terrestrial theropods is described by Persons, Currie & Erickson (2019).
- The tyrannosaur Suskityrannus originally found 1998 in the Moreno Hill Formation was described in May 2019. The genus serves as a gap between the smaller tyrannosaurids and the larger ones.
- Voris and others describe a juvenile Daspletosaurus postorbital and reidentify the only juvenile Daspletosaurus skeleton (TMP 1994.143.1) as a juvenile Gorgosaurus.

=== 2020s ===
==== 2020 ====
- Wu and others described the new genus and species Jinbeisaurus wangi.
- Voris and others describe Thanatotheristes degrootorum.

==== 2022 ====
- Warshaw and Folwer named the new species Daspletosaurus wilsoni.

==== 2024 ====
- Dalman et al. described the new species Tyrannosaurus mcraeensis.
- Zheng et al. describe the new genus and species Asiatyrannus xui.
- Rivera-Sylva and Longrich named the new species Labocania aguillonae.

==== 2025 ====
- Voris et al. named the new species Khankhuuluu mongoliensis.
- Zanno and Napoli publish an extensive revision of the genus Nanotyrannus, recognize it as a valid taxon distinct from Tyrannosaurus, and name the new species N. lethaeus.

== See also ==
- History of paleontology
  - Timeline of paleontology
- Specimens of Tyrannosaurus
