= Llewellya Hillis =

Canadian-born American marine biologist (1930–2019)

- Llewellya Hillis, from a 1954 newspaper.
- Born: Llewellya Williams Hillis; 1930; Windsor, Ontario
- Died: March 23, 2019 (aged 88–89); Cape Cod, Massachusetts
- Other name: Llewellya Hillis-Colinvaux
- Occupation: Biologist
- Spouse: Paul Colinvaux

Llewellya Williams Hillis (1930 – March 23, 2019), later Llewellya Hillis-Colinvaux, was a Canadian-born American marine biologist.

== Early life ==
Llewellya Hillis was born in Windsor, Ontario and raised in Walkerville. She graduated from Walkerville Collegiate Institute. Her father Llewellyn Hillis worked at an automotive plant, and her mother Pearl Evelina Hillis was a teacher. She earned her bachelor's degree at Queen's University in 1952. In 1957 she completed her doctoral work in botany at the University of Michigan; her thesis titled "A Revision of the Genus Halimeda (order Siphonales)" was published in 1959. As a graduate student, she did research at the Marine Biological Laboratory at Woods Hole, Massachusetts.

== Career ==
Hillis held a post-doctoral appointment at the University of New Brunswick, before joining the botany faculty at Ohio State University in 1964 (she transferred to the zoology faculty in 1972). "It was a ten-year fight to be recognized. No recognition has come to me as easily as it has to my male counterparts," she said of her academic career. "However, the progress that has been made is now so firmly entrenched that it will be hard to dismantle it completely."

Though landlocked Ohio was not the ideal place to be a marine biologist, she continued her work on coral reef algae, especially in the genus Halimeda. She secured funding from the U.S. Office of Naval Research and from the National Science Foundation. She imported seawater to Ohio to cultivate a seaweed colony for study. In 1976, she traveled to Enewetak Atoll to find Halimeda in a nuclear bomb crater. Hillis and Colinvaux left Ohio in the 1990s and continued their research at the Smithsonian Tropical Research Institute in Panama. She published a monograph on Halimeda in 1980.

Hillis held fellowships at the British Museum (1971) and the Bunting Institute (1985-1987). Two coral reef species are named for her: Carpathea llewellyae and Leckhamptonella llewellyae.

== Selected publications ==
- Ecology and Taxonomy of Halimeda: Primary Producer of Coral Reefs. Llewellya Hillis-Colinvaux. Advances in Marine Biology. Volume 17, 1980, Pages 1–327.
- Geology and biological zonation of the reef slope, 50–360 m depth at Enewetak Atoll, Marshall Islands. Colin, Patrick L.; Devaney, Dennis M.; Hillis-Colinvaux, Llewellya; Suchanek, Thomas H.; and Harrison, John T. Bulletin of Marine Science, Volume 38, Number 1, January 1986, pp. 111–128(18).
- Electron microscope study of calcification in the alga Halimeda (order Siphonales). Karl M. Wilbur, Llewellya Hillis Colinvaux and Norimitsu Watabe. Phycologia Volume 8, 1969 - Issue 1.
- Halimeda growth and diversity on the deep fore-reef of Enewetak Atoll. Llewellya Hillis Colinvaux. Coral Reefs.
- Deep water populations of Halimeda in the economy of an atoll. Hillis-Colinvaux, Llewellya. Bulletin of Marine Science, Volume 38, Number 1, January 1986, pp. 155–169(15).

== Personal life ==
Hillis married fellow biologist Paul Colinvaux in 1961. They had two children, Roger and Catherine. They retired to Cape Cod, and were active in the Woods Hole community in their later years. Hillis was widowed when Colinvaux died in 2016, and she died in 2019, on Cape Cod, aged 89 years.
