= Walkerville Collegiate Institute =

High school in Windsor, Canada

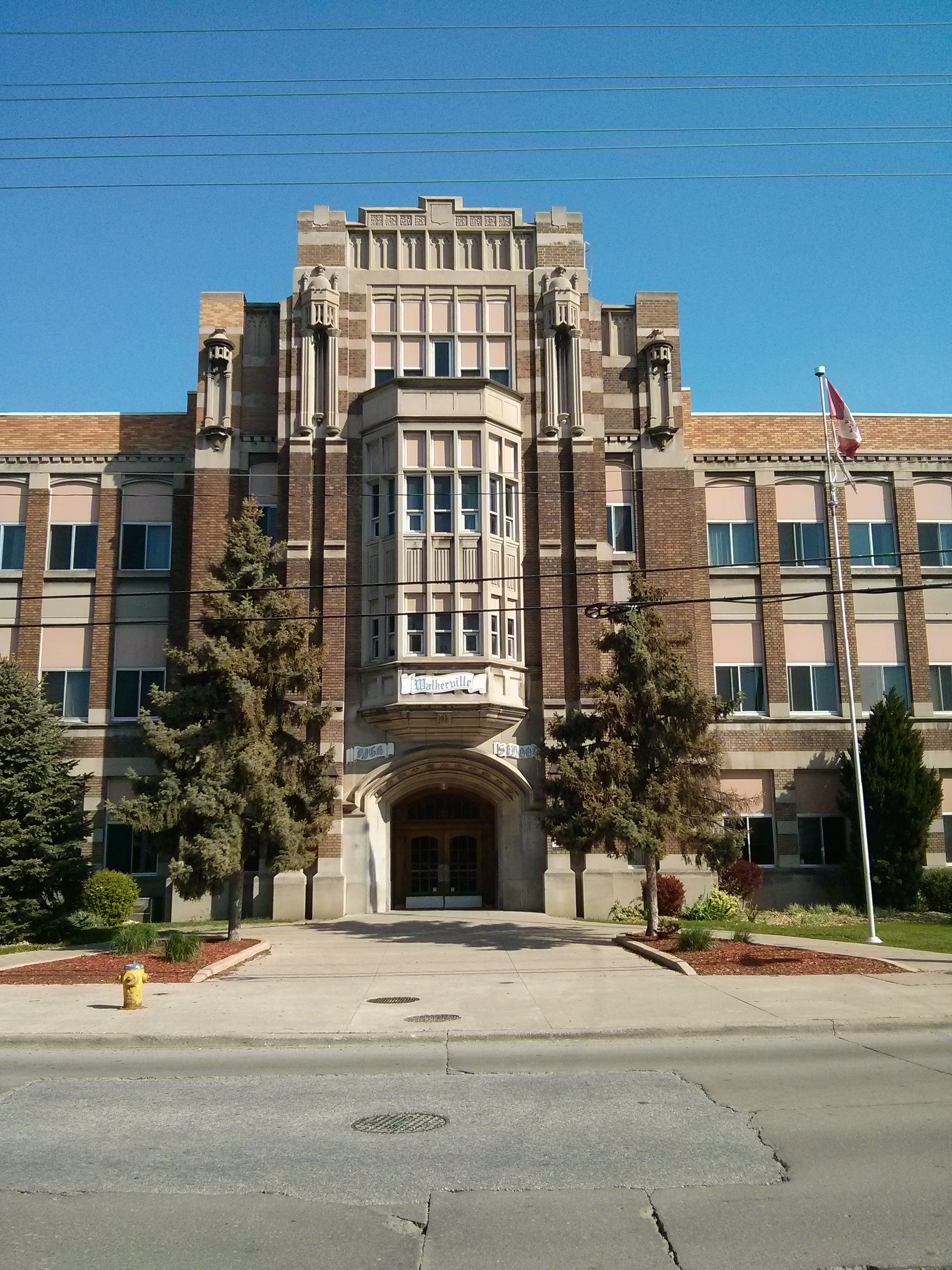

Location
- 2100 Richmond Street; Windsor, Ontario, N8Y 1L4; Canada; 42.31715°N 83.00691°W

Information
- School type: Collegiate Institute
- Motto: "Nil Sine Labore" ("Nothing without work")
- Founded: 1922
- School board: GECDSB
- Principal: Dan Gray
- Vice Principal: Jason Pfaff
- Senior Secretary: Christine Borysowytsch
- Grades: 9 to 12
- Enrollment: 854
- Language: English
- Colours: Blue and White
- Team name: Tartans
- Website: publicboard.ca/schools/walkerville/Pages/default.aspx

Walkerville Collegiate Institute (WCI) is a secondary school (grades 9 to 12) in the Walkerville area of Windsor, Ontario and managed by the Greater Essex County District School Board. It is the home of the Walkerville Centre for the Creative Arts (WCCA), which has arts programs in drama, dance, visual arts, media, and vocal.

Walkerville hosts one of three Community Living (STEPS Programs) in the district, which serves more than 30 developmentally challenged students. Walkerville also has sports teams which include basketball, soccer, volleyball, tennis, and badminton.

Walkerville's feeder schools include:

- King Edward Public School
- Hugh Beaton Public School
- Prince Edward Public School
- FW Begley Public School

== History ==
Walkerville Collegiate Institute officially opened its doors to the public on September 2, 1922. Located in the Old Walkerville area, named for Hiram Walker, it is across the street from Willistead Park, the former estate of Edward Chandler Walker, the second son of Hiram Walker.

The school started with 195 students and a staff of ten, with Mr. Robert Meade as Principal. Initially, there were 22 classrooms, an area for manual training for the boys, a cooking and sewing area for the girls, a wood-panelled library, a gymnasium, "The Plunge" pool, and an auditorium.

In 1929, Walkerville's kilted Cadet Corps was formed and the Pipe Band was recognized through competition as the best in the province.

Major renovations were completed in 1957 with the addition of a new gymnasium, cafeteria, rifle range and quartermaster stores and a new music room. The main office was renovated in 1966, new classrooms were added along, and the changing area for the girls' physical education classes was improved.

In 1986, the Community living program was added. In 1989, Walkerville was selected as the home for the Walkerville Centre for the Creative Arts and facilities expanded again to meet the needs of Vocal and Instrumental Music, Art and Dance as well as painting, printmaking and sculpture programs.

Starting in 2021, the school started a major renovation project. The project includes, but is not limited to, the replacement of all the building's windows, the infill of the closed pool, renovation of the cafeteria, relocation of the music and dance classrooms and re–pointing of the exterior masonry.

Today, there are over 800 students and a staff of 70. "Nil sine Labore" (Nothing Without Work) remains the school motto.

== WCCA ==
WCCA (Walkerville Centre for the Creative Arts), is an art program including drama, dance, visual arts, media arts, vocal and instrumental music. All students must audition to be accepted into the programs. Teachers and small group tutors specializing in a particular arts program collaborate to improve the artistic students in their work.

=== Visual arts program ===
The WCCA visual arts program includes painting, sculpture, printmaking, and drawing. The students begin with fundamental principles of design and drawing in grade 9. Twice every year, the WCCA visual and media arts students organize a show at the local ArtSpeak gallery. Students have exhibited artwork at Windsor's Art in the Park, and have been included in many other local shows.

=== Music program ===
The largest section in the music program is the band program. Within the band is another section, known as Wind Ensemble or Senior band. This much smaller group is composed of senior or advanced level band students, and the Wind Ensemble has its own series of performances that run in tandem with the full concert band. Followed by the band program is the Pit Orchestra. Pit Orchestra is, depending on the year and number of students, smaller than Wind Ensemble and typically occurs once a year, with one major performance.

=== Drama program ===
In 2009, WCCA drama participated in the Sears Drama Festival and advanced to the Provincials Showcase level with the play "The Insanity of Mary Girard." The following year, they performed again in the Sears Festival, with the original play "The Holding Room" moving onto the Provincials as well. The play was based on the murder of Reena Virk.

In August 2010, a group of 30 students from the WCCA drama program were invited to Edinburgh, Scotland for the Edinburgh Fringe Festival. While there, they performed the comedy musical, The Drowsy Chaperone.

In August 2014, A number of students from the WCCA drama program returned to Edinburgh, Scotland for the Edinburgh Fringe Festival. While they were there, they performed In the Heights.

On May 8, 2020, a former WCCA Drama teacher John-Anthony Nabben was found guilty of professional misconduct, approximately four years after claims were filed that he abused students "physically, sexually, verbally, psychologically or emotionally".

==== Sears productions ====
Every Year, WCCA drama enters a play into the Sears Ontario Drama Festival. Recent plays have included:

- 2007/2008: Tuesdays and Sundays
- 2008/2009: The Insanity of Mary Girard
- 2009/2010: The Holding Room (Original Play written by John-Anthony Nabben and students)
- 2010/2011: The Shape of Sarah (Original Play written by John-Anthony Nabben and students)
- 2012/2013: It's an Art Thing (Original Play written by John-Anthony Nabben and students)
- 2013/2014: This is For You, Anna
- 2014/2015: Dracula Abridged
- 2015/2016: Ernest and the Pale Moon
- 2018/2019: The Tell-Tale Heart

== Past productions ==
Most years, Walkerville has the honour of performing two major shows per school year—a straight drama and a musical—with music provided by the WCCA Student Orchestra.

Year	Straight Drama	Musical
2019–2020	Waiting For The Parade / Giselle	The Frogs (play w/ music)
2018–2019	The Learned Ladies / Rhinoceros	Chitty Chitty Bang Bang
2017–2018	The Laramie Project / The Trojan Women	Hairspray
2016–2017	The Comedy of Errors	Li'l Abner
2015–2016	To Kill a Mockingbird	Anything Goes
2014–2015		Stories of the Joshua Tree – A Tribute To U2 / Dracula
2013–2014	This is For You, Anna	In the Heights
2012–2013		
2011–2012	My Daughter Vera (formally "The Holding Room")	The Phantom of the Opera
2010–2011	My Daughter Vera (formally "The Holding Room")	
2009–2010	The Holding Room	Beauty and Beast / The Drowsy Chaperone
2008–09	The Crucible	Seussical
2007–08	A Midsummer Night's Dream	The Pajama Game
2006–07	The Diary of Anne Frank	Into the Woods
2005–06	The Miracle Worker	Fifteen
2004–05	One Flew Over the Cuckoo's Nest	A Chorus Line
2003–04	The Importance of Being Earnest	Oklahoma!
2002–03		Les Misérables
2001–02		Grease
2000–01		Joseph and the Amazing Technicolor Dreamcoat
1999–00		Evita
1998–99		Schoolhouse Rock Live / Little Shop of Horrors
1997–98		Oliver!
1996–97	Brighton Beach Memoirs	
1995–96		Seven Brides for Seven Brothers
1994–95		The Pirates of Penzance
1993–94	Rumors	42nd Street
1992–93	Charley's Aunt	Fiddler on the Roof
1991–92	The Ecstasy of Rita Joe	West Side Story

== Notable graduates ==
- Tamia Hill (formerly Tamia Washington) is a Grammy-nominated R&B singer and actress.
- Llewellya Hillis (1930–2019), marine biologist
- Steve Bacic, actor, appeared in TV shows including Andromeda, 21 Jump Street, Street Justice, The Commish, Highlander, Call of the Wild, Stargate:SG–1 and The X–Files.
- Sylvia Fedoruk, Medical Physicist specializing in cobalt-60 cancer treatment, inducted into the Canadian Medical Hall of Fame.
- Alexandria Masse, visual artist specializing in textiles.

== See also ==
- Education in Ontario
- List of secondary schools in Ontario
