= The Fates of Nations =

- Author: Paul A. Colinvaux
- Language: English
- Subject: Social evolution, history of civilization, ethnology, human effects on the environment, cultural diffusion, military history, human ecology, niche(ecology)
- Publisher: Simon & Schuster
- Publication date: August 18, 1980
- Publication place: United States
- Media type: Hardcover, Paperback
- Pages: 383 pages
- ISBN: 0-671-25204-6
- OCLC: 6143975
- Dewey Decimal: 901
- LC Class: D16.9 .C597

The Fates of Nations: A Biological Theory of History is a 1980 book by Paul Colinvaux, professor of ecology at Ohio State University.

== Description ==
The book is a theory of history from an ecologist's perspective, arguing that the fundamental structure and constraints of human breeding habits can explain much of the ebb and flow of human history. Published 17 years before Guns, Germs, and Steel (and now out of print), it is broader in scope and more politically incorrect, dealing with and explaining such issues as the prevalence of infanticide throughout human history, and the rise of religion. Some major points:

- Niches are professions, and have limited intake.

The squirrel is highly tuned to a very specialized profession. It cannot change its way of life. Squirrels, therefore, live only in times and places suited to the squirrel way of life, to the squirrel niche. [It follows that] the numbers of any kind of squirrel that may live are fixed.

- Species are vehicles for niche discovery. Each niche establishes a limit on population; individuals compete for a slice of this pie by natural selection.
- A crucial part of success in leaving behind descendants is to correctly estimate the optimum number of children to maximize one's chances. Infanticide is one way to modulate this estimation, given the time taken for human babies to mature.
- For the last 10,000 years, man has been able to create new niches.
- For humans, a niche is not about survival but about lifestyle; children want to grow up in the lifestyle to which they have grown accustomed.
- Man is an ice-age species. The ice age wasn't actually colder across the planet. Since the ice caps were larger, the oceans receded. The tropical savannahs were larger. Man has evolved to like broad open spaces, and to value choice.
- Wealth and poverty are two extreme types of niche. The wealthy live lifestyles closer to those they were evolved to enjoy. The poor are poor because their constraints deny them various aspects of this lifestyle.
- The poor have many children because more children don't require much more to raise. The rich have few children because they can't afford more in their lifestyle.
- As a civilization grows, its poor grow in number. The rich feel first the pinch of narrowing niche spaces. These lead their children to trade.
- A common pattern is for island nations to grow militarily, since trading ships are temptations to pirates and require armored defense, and provide the civilization with occasions to practice and perfect war.
- As trade grows, life improves for all. Population grows in response. The rich, once again squeezed, eye neighboring lands.
- If the neighboring lands have barbarians who live relatively "rich" lives, they are conquered by large densities of poorer people. (See Prisoner's dilemma) This explains the Roman conquest of Western Europe and Britain.
- If the neighboring lands have another citified civilization, they must be conquered by technology. This explains the Roman subjugation of Carthage, and Alexander's invasion of Persia. The modern European conquest of the new world is similar in many ways.
- Wars of aggression are always caused by rising numbers. Wars of aggression are always popular wars.
- Wars are not won by superior numbers but by superior technology and technique. All you need is a superiority of two to one or three to one at the point of contact of opposing infantry. Good generalship is about making this happen.
- Aggressive war becomes a habit to nations that pursue it successfully.
- Controlling birth rate is the primary way to transcend the pattern of history.
