= Why Big Fierce Animals Are Rare =

Why Big Fierce Animals Are Rare is a 1978 book written by Paul Colinvaux.

== Contents ==
Why Big Fierce Animals Are Rare is a book in which the functions of ecology are introduced.

== Reception ==
David Dunham reviewed Why Big Fierce Animals Are Rare for Different Worlds magazine and stated that "I strongly recommend Why Big Fierce Animals Are Rare. It is fun as well as informative, and useful for any scenario or campaign designer, from the science-fiction role-player designing a planet, to the fantasy gamer worrying about dragons."
