= Alexandria Masse =

Canadian visual artist

- Born: September 26, 2000 (age 24); Windsor, Ontario, Canada
- Education: NSCAD University; Walkerville Collegiate Institute
- Occupation(s): Visual artist, Textile artist
- Father: Brian Masse
- Website: alexandriamasse.com

Alexandria K. Masse is a Canadian textile artist, soft sculptor, and illustrator based in Windsor, Ontario. She is notable for her use of crochet to create intricate headwear and large soft sculptures.

== Career ==
Alexandria Masse has illustrated nine children's books published between 2018 and 2021. These works include Everyone Can Learn Math and Let's Explore Math by author Alice Aspinall, Finding Lost Smiles, Hallway Connections, Gracie, Gracie: The Maker, Think Like a Coder, Rosie and the Power of Positivity Team and The Magic of Growth Mindset.

While studying textiles and fashion at NSCAD University, Masse's collection of crochet balaclavas received viral attention online. Masse uses wool to combine colourful motifs into wearable fashion that often resemble animals and unconventional objects such as bunnies, cats, Chinese dragons, teapots, and medieval weaponry. Her headwear has been worn by Instasamka, Melanie Martinez, Poppy, Rauw Alejandro, Rich Brian, and Rico Nasty.

Inspired by her Chinese heritage, Masse created a series of crocheted wearable art pieces titled Dim Sum at the Silver Dragon in 2022. Her grandparents' former restaurant, The Silver Dragon, which operated in Masse's hometown of Windsor, led her to create headdresses shaped like traditional Chinese food from the region of Guangdong. The collection helped Masse win the $10,000 CAD 2022 Fluevog Artist Grant from Fluevog Shoes. A 3-meter wide (10 feet) wide spider sculpture created by Masse is permanently displayed at a Fluevog Shoes store in Toronto's Distillery District.

Masse received the 2023 RBC Emerging Artist in Residence (EAIR) award for the Art Windsor-Essex.

== Education and personal life ==
Masse is the daughter of Brian Masse and Terry Chow. She graduated from NSCAD University in 2022 with a Bachelor of Fine Arts and minor in art history.
