= Bulletin of Marine Science =

Peer-reviewed scientific journal

- Discipline: Marine science
- Language: English
- Edited by: Joseph E. Serafy

Publication details
- Former names: Bulletin of Marine Science of the Gulf and Caribbean
- History: 1951–present
- Publisher: Rosenstiel School of Marine, Atmospheric, and Earth Science at the University of Miami
- Frequency: Quarterly
- Open access: open access journal, after 3 years
- Impact factor: 1.632 (2020)

Standard abbreviations
- ISO 4: Bull. Mar. Sci.

Indexing
- ISSN: 0007-4977 (print); 1553-6955 (web)
- OCLC no.: 297220873

Links
- Journal homepage; [www.ingentaconnect.com/content/umrsmas/bullmar Online access]

The Bulletin of Marine Science is a peer-reviewed scientific journal published by the Rosenstiel School of Marine, Atmospheric, and Earth Science at the University of Miami. The journal was established in 1951 as the Bulletin of Marine Science of the Gulf and Caribbean and obtained its current name in 1965. All content is available electronically, and for issues older than three years, free of charge.

== Scope ==
The Bulletin of Marine Science covers marine biology, ecology, biological oceanography, fisheries management, marine policy, marine geology, marine geophysics, marine chemistry, atmospheric chemistry, meteorology, and physical oceanography.
