= Paul Colinvaux =

English ecologist

Paul Colinvaux (September 22, 1930 – February 28, 2016) was an ecologist and professor emeritus at Ohio State University.

Colinvaux was born in London, England. He attended University College School ("UCS") in London, where his activities included rowing in the Princess Elizabeth Challenge Cup at Henley Royal Regatta. After graduating from UCS, Colinvaux earned a commission in the Royal Artillery. He was stationed in Germany as part of the British occupation after World War II. Colinvaux achieved the rank of second lieutenant.

After leaving the army, Colinvaux matriculated at the University of Cambridge (Jesus College). After graduating, he emigrated to New Brunswick, Canada, where he was employed by a government soil survey. In New Brunswick, Colinvaux met his future wife, Llewellya Hillis of Windsor, Ontario. Hillis and Colinvaux married in British Columbia, before emigrating to the United States where Colinvaux earned his Ph.D. at Duke University. After completing post-doctoral studies at Yale University, Colinvaux and Hillis took up "his and her" appointments in the Department of Botany & Zoology at Ohio State University in 1964. They remained at the university until approximately 1990.

During his years at Ohio State University, Colinvaux won every teaching prize that could then be awarded for undergraduate teaching. He also played a role in ending the 1970 student riots at OSU (which is chronicled in Woody Hayes' memoir, You Win With People).

In 1991, Colinvaux and Hillis left Ohio State University to take positions with the Smithsonian Tropical Research Institute (STRI) in Panama. He left STRI later in the 1990s and, after settling in Woods Hole, Massachusetts, became affiliated with the University of Chicago Marine Biological Laboratory Ecosystems Center.

== Life ==
Colinvaux was the author of several books, including Why Big Fierce Animals Are Rare: An Ecologist's Perspective (1978), The Fates of Nations: A Biological Theory of History (1980), and the textbook, Ecology (1993). Most recently, Colinvaux published a scientific memoir, Amazon Expeditions: My Quest for the Ice Age Equator (2008).

He was the recipient of the Ohio State University Distinguished Scholar Award in 1985.

He presented the PBS television series, What Ecology Really Says.

== Works ==
- Colinvaux, Paul A., ed. (1970). The Environment of Crowded Men. New York: MSS Educational Publishing. ISBN 084220086X.
- Colinvaux, Paul A. (1973). Introduction to ecology. New York: Wiley. ISBN 0-471-16498-4.
- Colinvaux, Paul A. (1978). Why big fierce animals are rare: an ecologist's perspective. Princeton, N.J: Princeton University Press. ISBN 0-691-02364-6.
- Colinvaux, Paul A. (1980). The Fates of Nations: A Biological Theory of History. New York: Simon and Schuster. ISBN 0-671-25204-6.
- Colinvaux, Paul A. (1986). Ecology. New York: Wiley. ISBN 0471165026.
- Colinvaux, Paul A. (1993). Ecology 2. New York: Wiley. ISBN 0-471-59954-9.
- Colinvaux, Paul A. (2007). Amazon expeditions: my quest for the ice-age equator. New Haven, Conn: Yale University Press. ISBN 978-0-300-11544-4.
