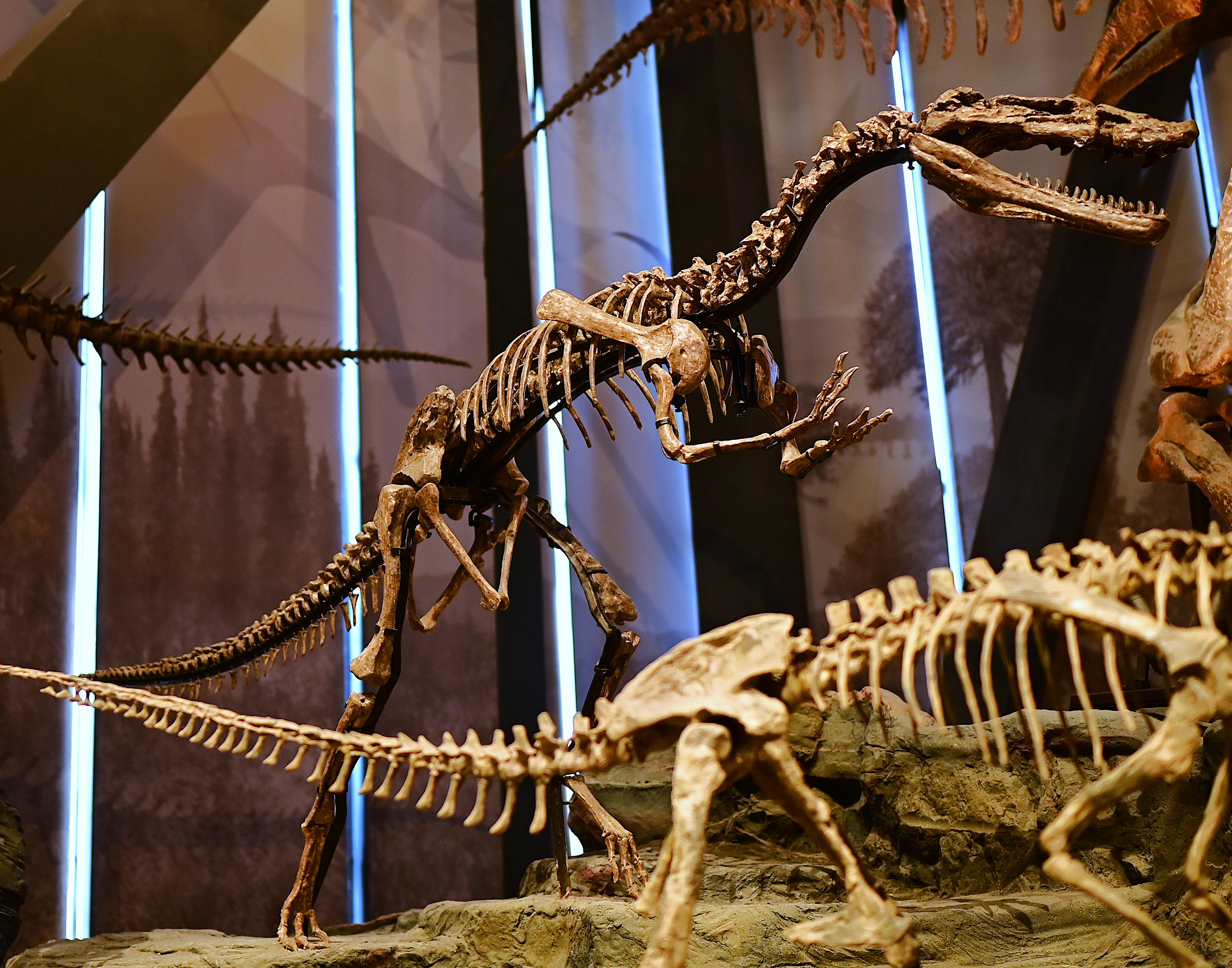
- Skeletal mount on display at the Baoding Natural History Museum

Scientific classification
- Kingdom: Animalia
- Phylum: Chordata
- Class: Reptilia
- Clade: Dinosauria
- Clade: Saurischia
- Clade: Theropoda
- Superfamily: †Tyrannosauroidea
- Clade: †Pantyrannosauria
- Genus: †Xiongguanlong; Li et al., 2009

Type species
- †Xiongguanlong baimoensis Li et al., 2009

= Xiongguanlong =

Xiongguanlong Temporal range: Early Cretaceous ~124 to 113 Ma - Aptian

Extinct genus of dinosaurs

Xiongguanlong (/ɕiʊŋˌkwaːnˈlʊŋ/) is an extinct genus of tyrannosauroid theropod from the Early Cretaceous period of what is now China. The type and only species is X. baimoensis. The generic name comes from Jiayuguan City (formerly called "Xiong Guan" or "grand pass") and the Mandarin word "long" which means dragon. The specific epithet, "baimoensis" is a latinization of the Mandarin word for "white ghost" in reference to one of the geological features of the type locality (nicknamed the "White Ghost Castle"). While Xiongguanlong was a basal tyrannosauroid, it was more derived than forms like Eotyrannus, placing it closer to the origins of Tyrannosauridae.

== Discovery ==
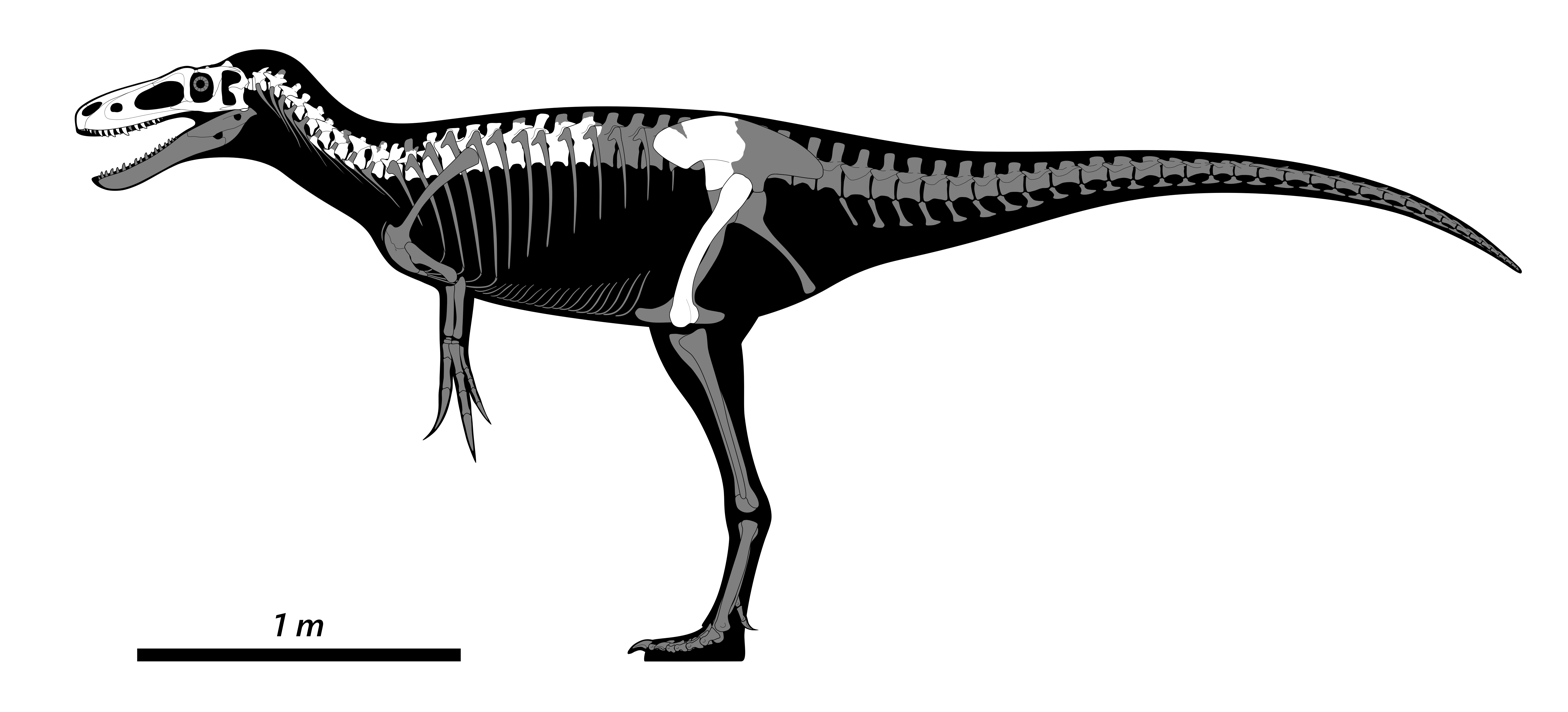
Skeletal diagram with the holotype in white

Xiongguanlong was discovered in the upper member of the Xiagou Formation of the Xinminbao Group at a locality nicknamed the "White Ghost Castle" which is in the Yujingzi Basin of Gansu, China. This is the same locality from which the holotype of the ornithomimosaur Beishanlong was recovered.

It was discovered in and prepared in 2006 and 2007 by Mark Norell, Peter Makovicky, and a team of scientists from Beijing University. In their original description, the authors hypothesize that it is from either the Aptian or Albian stages, but subsequent authors have constrained the upper member to the Aptian stage specifically.

The holotype, and only specimen, of Xiongguanlong was given the designation FRDC-GS JB16-2-1 and was deposited at the Fossil Research and Development Center of the Gansu Provincial Bureau of Geo-Exploration and Mineral Development in Lanzhou, China. It consists of a complete skull (lacking the lower jaws), a complete series of cervical and dorsal vertebrae, a partial right ilium, and the right femur. It was initially discovered in the early 2000s, but it was not described until 2009 when a paper was published in the Proceedings of the Royal Society by the paleontologists Daqing Li, Mark Norell, Ke-Qin Gao, Nathan D. Smith, and Peter J. Makovicky.

In its initial description, and in numerous publications since, it has been remarked as a noteworthy transitional species between the basal tyrannosauroids of the Jurassic period and the derived tyrannosaurids of the Late Cretaceous.

== Description ==
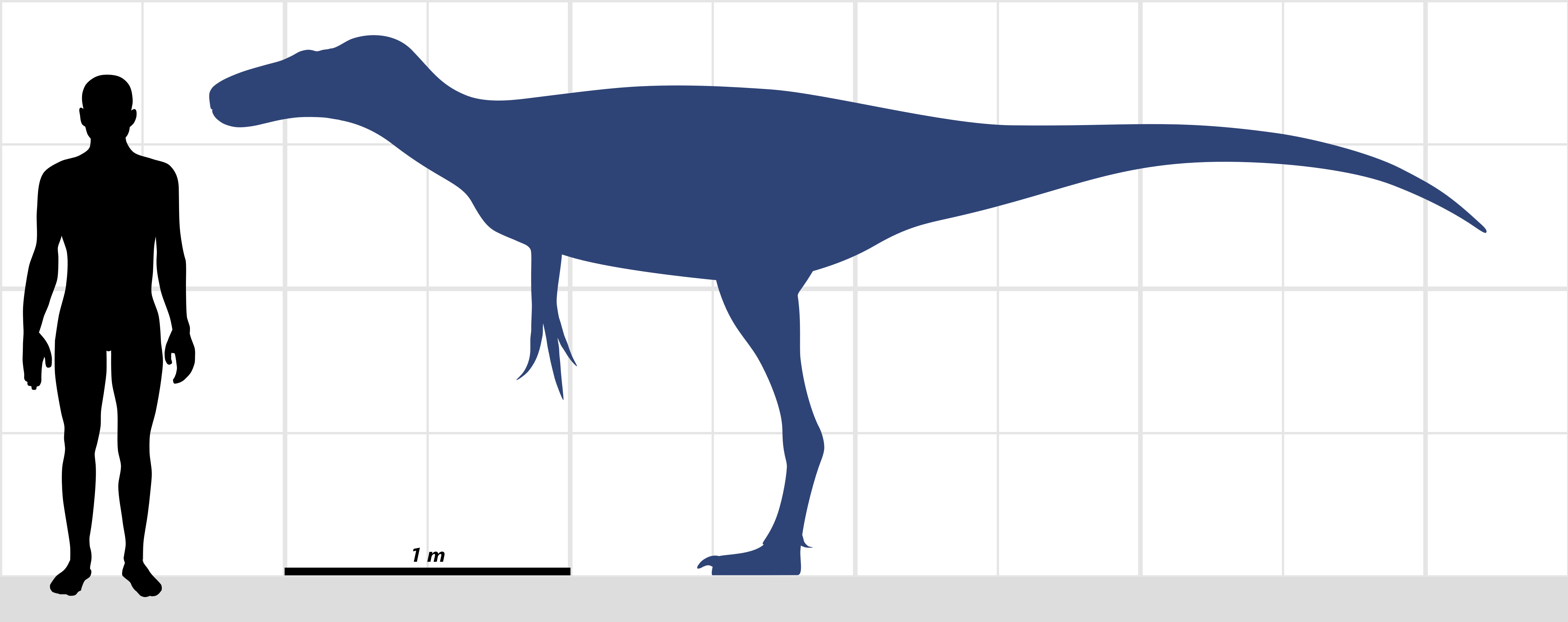
Estimated size compared to a human

The authors of its original description estimated that Xiongguanlong was about 5 metres (16 ft) long. They used a regression analysis based on the work of P. Christiansen and R.A. Fariña to estimate its mass at approximately 270 kilograms (600 lb). However, Gregory S. Paul estimated that it only weighed about 200 kilograms (440 lb). The holotype is believed to have been completely or almost completely, fully-grown due to the observed closure of the neurocentral sutures. Its estimated size is much greater than earlier tyrannosauroids such as Dilong and Guanlong, which led the authors to suggest that body size increase in tyrannosauroids was a continuous process throughout the Cretaceous period. Although most of the legs and tail are not preserved, it is believed to have had body proportions similar to Alioramus.

Autapomorphies of the genus given by the authors in its description include the following: a very elongate pre-orbital region, a basicranium that is wider than it is long, the absence of pneumatic foramina on the lateral edge of the nasal bone, a ridge on the middle of the premaxillary teeth, and lateral processes in the axial neural spines. It is also distinguished from later tyrannosauroids by the lack of rugosities on the nasal bone and a lack of pneumatic elements of the quadrate bone.

=== Skull ===
Holotype skull (FRDC-GS JB16-2-1)

The skull of the holotype is preserved completely including the palate and the braincase, but lacks the mandible. It is very elongated in comparison to most other tyrannosauroids, with significant elongation of the maxillary, lacrimal, and the postorbital bones. Despite being relatively complete, the skull is not very well-preserved. It was fossilized in a mineralized nodule which led to difficulty in differentiating the bone from the matrix in which it was preserved. This led to difficulty in determining the overall topology of the skull bones and the obscuring of the existence of the maxillary fenestrae. However, numerous distinctive features are evident in spite of the preservation quality.

One of the distinctive features of most tyrannosauroid skulls are the nasal bones, which are fused. Xiongguanlong also exhibits this trait, but it lacks the sagittal rugosities present in derived tyrannosaurids. The nasal also exhibits the advanced feature of lacking the pneumatic elements on the lateral sides of the nasal, which is seen in less-derived genera like Dilong and Eotyrannus.

The rest of the skull is also characteristically compact. The prefrontal bone is small, triangular, and does not contact the orbit. The parietal bones are fused and possess a short and concave sagittal crest, which served as attachment sites for the bite muscles. The quadrate bone is also large and has expanded lateral condyles, which are suggested to be related to the jaw musculature as well. The postorbital bone is much anteroposteriorally elongated and vertical in relation to the infratemporal fenestra, which resembles advanced tyrannosaurids. The palate is also very robust due to a deep, blade-like vomer bone and large, blocky ectopterygoid bones.

Some of the teeth are not very well-preserved, but the dental alveoli are visible. This led the authors of its description to determine that Xiongguanlong had four premaxillary teeth and fifteen maxillary teeth. The premaxillary teeth are characteristically d-shaped in cross-section and serrated, like most other tyrannosauroids. However, the maxillary teeth differ from more derived tyrannosauroids in being lateromedially narrow and more blade-like.

=== Post-cranial skeleton ===
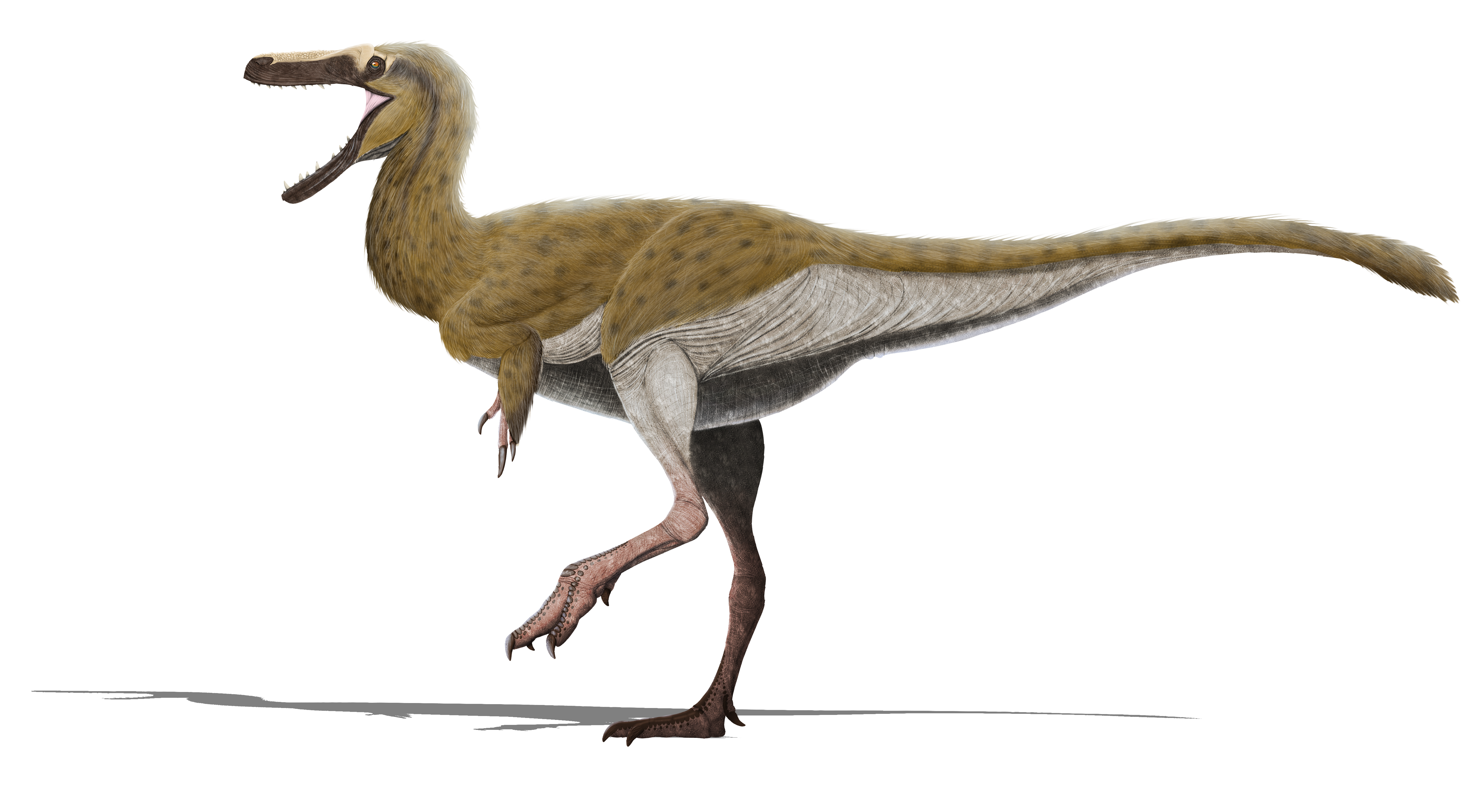
Life restoration showing hypothetical feathers

The preserved post-cranial bones of Xiongguanlong include the entire series of cervical and dorsal vertebrae, part of the ilium and a femur. Several skeletal elements bear similarities to other tyrannosauroids and also to some non-tyrannosauroid theropods.

The cervical centra are strongly co-ossified with the neural arches, and the centra are concave in anterior direction and convex in the posterior direction. They also possess a pair of pneumatic foramina on the vertebrae, which is unlike the condition seen in Albertosaurus, Daspletosaurus, and Tyrannosaurus. The dorsal vertebrae have widely expanded neural arches that completely overlay the centra when viewed from above, although this is not true of the cervical vertebrae, which more closely resemble the neural arches seen in Dilong. The height of the neural spines increases posteriorly, although the exact height of the posterior dorsal vertebrae is not known because the vertebrae were more badly damaged during fossilization.

The preserved hip elements of Xiongguanlong resemble those of derived tyrannosauroids as well as those of ornithomimosaurs. The femur is also very similar to derived tyrannosauroids regarding the location and extent of the fourth trochanter. A tibia was also found with the rest of the skeleton, although its comparatively small size led Li and colleagues to conclude that it was probably not from the same animal as the rest of the bones.

== Classification ==
=== Phylogeny ===
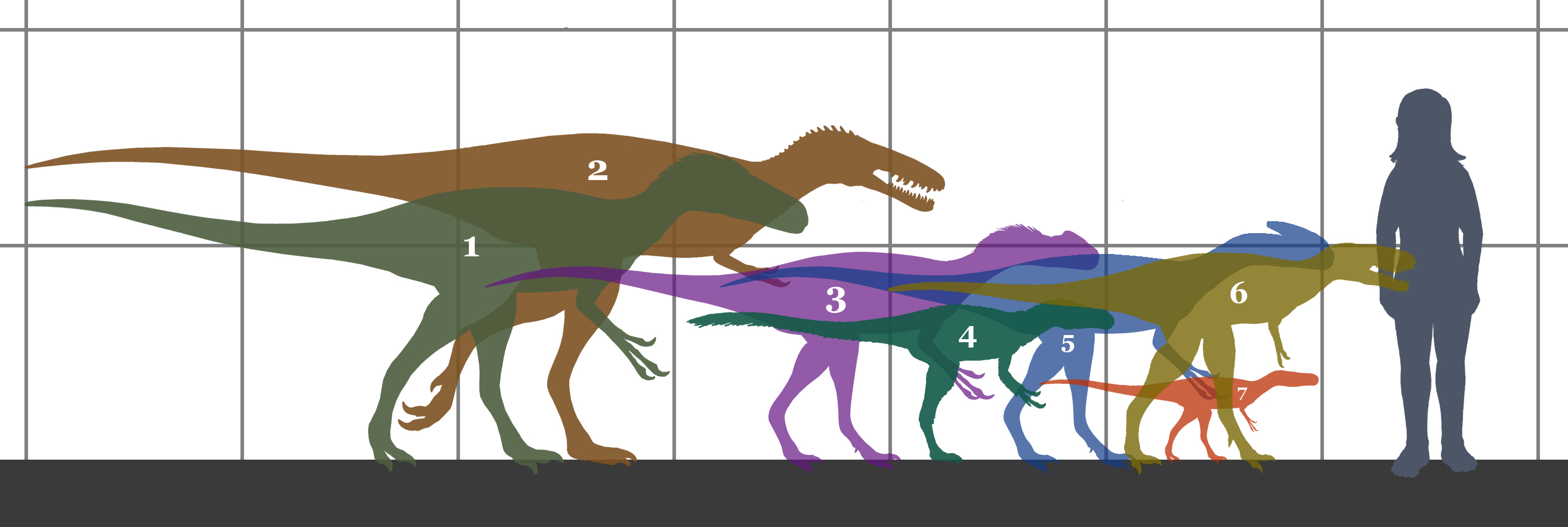
A size comparison of several small tyrannosauroids, Xiongguanlong is labeled (2)

In their description of Xiongguanlong in 2009, Li and colleagues published a phylogenetic analysis of Tyrannosauroidea. They recovered Xiongguanlong as a member of this group based on the following synapomorphies: a vertical ridge on the midline of the ilium, a notch on the dorsal edge of the ilium, fused nasal bones, and premaxillary teeth much smaller than the maxillary teeth.

They also recovered several clades within Tyrannosauroidea that had yet to be formally named at the time of its description. The first of these ("clade 1" on the diagram) was a clade which included all tyrannosauroids except for proceratosaurids. This clade was diagnosed by the following synapomorphies: hourglass-shaped nasal bones, an enlarged foramen on the quadrate bone, and a broad postorbital bar. This clade was also recovered by Rafael Delcourt and Orlando Nelson Grillo in their phylogenetic study of tyrannosauroids in 2018. However, in their analysis, the synapomorphies recovered for this clade are primarily related to features of the hip bones (specifically the ilium and ischium), with no mention of any unifying skull features. They named this clade, "Pantyrannosauria" in reference to their hypothesis that this clade possessed a global distribution.

Li and colleagues recover Xiongguanlong as belonging to a slightly more derived clade ("clade 2" on the diagram) which includes taxa that are more closely related to Tyrannosauridae than they are to either Dilong or Eotyrannus. They diagnose this clade using the following synapomorphies: a medial ridge on the premaxillary teeth, a quadratojugal bone which flares outward, a basisphenoid bone that is wider than it is long, and lateral processes on the axial neural spines. This clade is not specifically mentioned or named by authors of any subsequent analyses.

They also recover a third, more exclusive clade ("clade 3" on the diagram), which excludes Xiongguanlong and includes all taxa more closely related to Tyrannosauridae. This clade was diagnosed, and Xiongguanlong was excluded from it, by the following synapomorphies: rugosities on the top of the nasal bone and subcondylar recesses in the brain case. They recover several more synapomorphies for each of these clades, but these are more weakly supported than the unambiguous synapomorphies listed above. This clade has been subsequently recovered by Delcourt and Grillo and was named "Eutyrannosauria"; however, the unambiguous synapomorphies for this clade which they recover are exclusively related to the post-cranial skeleton. A summary of Li and colleagues' phylogenetic analysis, including the clades they recovered, can be seen below.

Similar phylogenetic placements for Xiongguanlong has been subsequently recovered in the analyses of Xu Xing and colleagues (2012), Brusatte and colleagues (2016), Brusatte and Carr (2016), and Delcourt and Grillo (2018), Zanno and colleagues (2019), and Wolfe and colleagues (2019).

Phylogenetic Analysis (Li et al., 2010)

- Tyrannosauroidea
  - Guanlong
  - Proceratosaurus
  - Clade 1
    - Dilong
    - Eotyrannus
    - Clade 2
      - Xiongguanlong
      - Clade 3
        - Appalachiosaurus
        - Tyrannosauridae

In 2013, a team of scientists led by Mark Loewen, which included Philip J. Currie and Scott D. Sampson, published a description of the tyrannosaurid genus Lythronax which also contained a re-evaluation of the related taxon Teratophoneus. They conducted a phylogenetic analysis using a data set of 54 taxa (including 26 tyrannosauroid taxa) and over 300 scored characters to analyze the phylogenetic relationships of Lythronax and Teratophoneus.

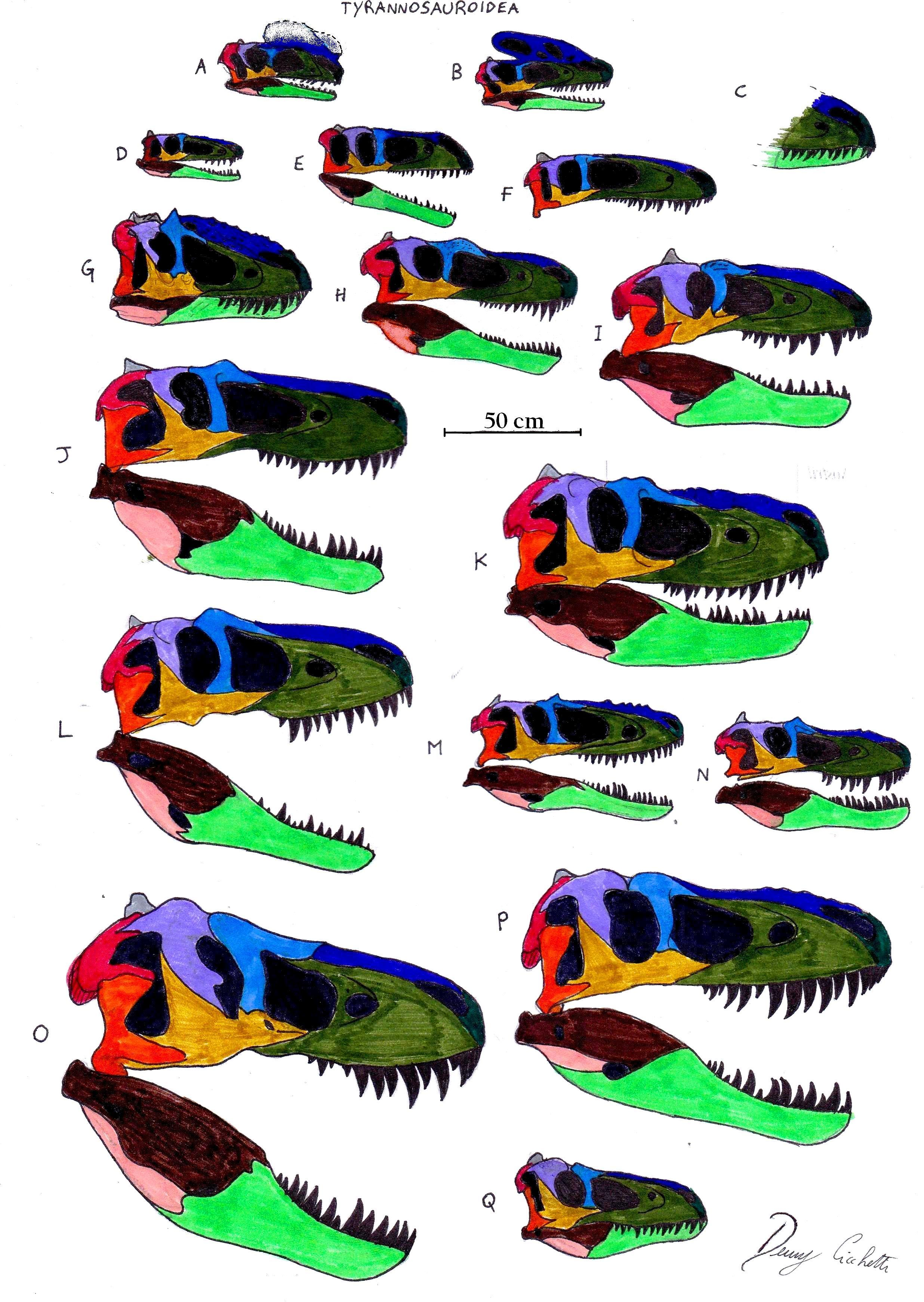
The skulls of various tyrannosauroids with Xiongguanlong labeled (F)

Their results recovered a relatively unique topology which contradicts the analyses of Brusatte and colleagues (2010) and that of Carr and colleagues (2010), which were the most up-to-date analyses before their own publication. Loewen and colleagues recovered Bistahieversor as being within Tyrannosauridae and Alioramus as being just outside that family. They further suggest that the controversial genus Raptorex is a distinct taxon, regardless of any hypotheses of its ontogeny. They also recovered Xiongguanlong and Alectrosaurus as sister taxa and being more derived than Dryptosaurus, which would place them within eutyrannosauria according to the definition given by Delcourt and Grillo (the least-inclusive clade containing both Tyrannosaurus and Dryptosaurus). An abbreviated version of the phylogeny that they recovered can be seen below.

- Tyrannosauroidea
  - Proceratosauridae
  - Pantyrannosauria
    - Dilong
    - - Eotyrannus
      - - Bagaraatan
        - - Raptorex
          - Eutyrannosauria
            - Dryptosaurus
            - - - Alectrosaurus
                - Xiongguanlong
              - - Appalachiosaurus
                - - Alioramus spp.
                  - Tyrannosauridae

The most recent comprehensive phylogenetic analysis of Tyrannosauroidea was conducted by Darren Naish and Andrea Cau in their monograph about the osteology and phylogeny of Eotyrannus in 2022. The analysis they conduct in their publication included 83 taxa and over 1,100 morphological characters, and it resulted in several novel hypotheses. The one which receives the most discussion in their conclusion is the placement of Megaraptora as being the sister-taxon of Eutyrannosauria. Naish and Cau suggest that the uniqueness of this analysis is an artifact of the lack of extensive sampling of megaraptorans in previous analyses. They recovered Xiongguanlong as the sister-taxon of the "Megaraptora + Eutyrannosauria clade", although they do not list any synapomorphies of this clade. They also discuss the implications that this has for the paleobiogeography of tyrannosauroids, specifically that they likely originated in Eurasia. An abbreviated version of the strict consensus tree from their analysis can be seen below.

- Tyrannosauroidea
  - - Juratyrant
    - Stokesosaurus
  - - - Tugulusaurus
      - - Tanycolagreus
        - Coelurus
    - - Proceratosauridae
      - Pantyrannosauria
        - Yutyrannus
        - - Eotyrannus
          - - Xiongguanlong
            - - Megaraptora
              - Eutyrannosauria

=== Evolutionary implications ===
Information regarding the evolution of tyrannosauroids has been relatively obscure since the group's naming in the early 20th-century. There are several basal taxa which are known from the Middle Jurassic (e.g. Guanlong, Kileskus, Proceratosaurus), a handful of more intermediate forms in the Early Cretaceous (e.g. Yutyrannus, Dilong, Eotyrannus), and numerous megafaunal hypercarnivorous genera from the Campanian and Maastrichtian (e.g. Tyrannosaurus, Albertosaurus, Daspletosaurus). The researchers who described the "middle Cretaceous" taxa including Xiongguanlong, Timurlengia, Moros, and Suskityrannus noted that these taxa partially fill this "Cretaceous tyrannosaur gap".

There are multiple theories regarding the biogeography of tyrannosauroids during the middle Cretaceous. The landmass of Laurasia was in the process of breaking up during the Early Cretaceous, meaning the Atlantic Ocean was much more narrow. There were also tyrannosauroids known from the Early Cretaceous of Europe, such as Eotyrannus, which has led some researchers to suggest that tyrannosauroids migrated to North America from Europe, possibly either by rafting or over a land bridge.

It has also been suggested that the landmass of Beringia had already formed by this time, which would have enabled the migration of animals from Asia to Laramidia. This is corroborated by the emergence of animals in North America with an apparent recent Asian ancestry including Eolambia and Microvenator. Tyrannosauroid teeth are known from the Aptian-Albian aged Cloverly Formation of Wyoming, meaning that some tyrannosauroids had likely migrated to North America prior to 108 million years ago. Other researchers believe that tyrannosauroids already possessed a global distribution by the Late Jurassic. However, some authors believe that the fossil record from this part of the Cretaceous is too poor to make any concrete inferences as to the nature of tyrannosauroid evolution or dispersal.

== Paleoecology ==
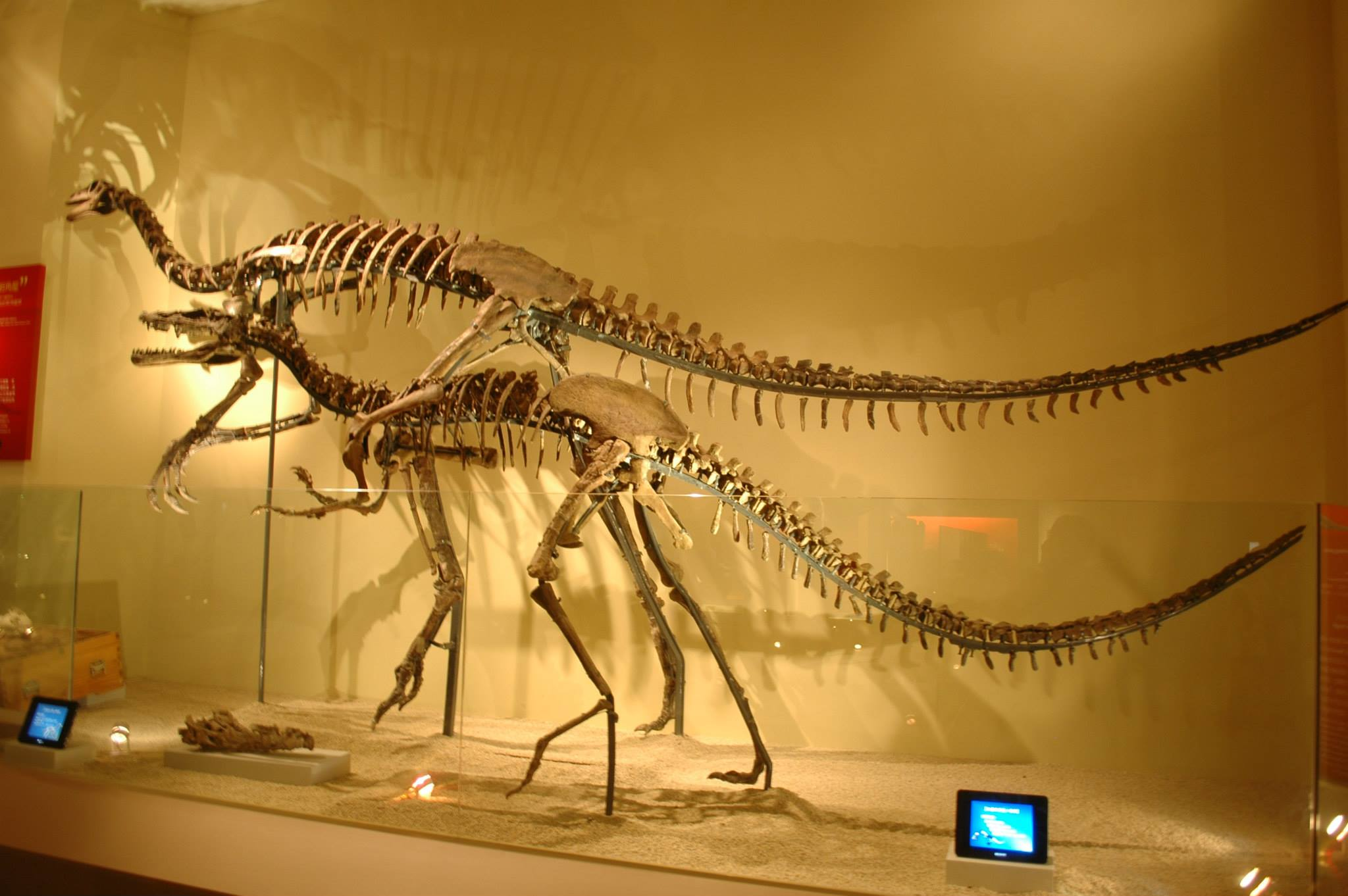
A skeletal mount of Xiongguanlong alsongside Beishanlong depicting a predator-prey relationship

=== Diet ===
Xiongguanlong is the largest predator so-far discovered in the Xiagou Formation. The larger theropods found in the area, Beishanlong and Suzhousaurus, are both believed to be herbivorous.

It was almost certainly an obligate carnivore, like all other known tyrannosauroids. However, it did not possess the adaptations for strong bite forces that are characteristic of derived tyrannosaurids. Similar taxa like Suskityrannus are believed to have been mid-sized predators in their ecosystem, but no large carnivorous theropods have yet been found in the same area, which may indicate that there was an evolutionary transition going on during the late Aptian of China.

=== Paleoenvironment ===
The Xiagou Formation is the second-youngest formation of the Xinminbu Group, and is stratigraphically positioned between the older Chinjinpu Formation and the younger Zhonggou Formation, all of which are located in the Yujingzi Basin of western Gansu. Today, this region is part of the Gobi Desert, but during the Early Cretaceous, it was a much less arid environment, and it was probably on or near the coast of the Tethys Sea.

The sediments of the formation consists of gray to mudstones and siltstones interbedded with sandstones and conglomerates. The composition of the Xiagou Formation indicates that there were likely lowlands surrounded by narrow hills, allowing dinosaur faunas to travel across areas without geographical barriers. Some fossilized waterbirds have been preserved with the soft-tissues of their webbed feet and feathers still preserved, which has led authors to conclude that lakes with anoxic lake beds were also present.

=== Contemporary fauna ===
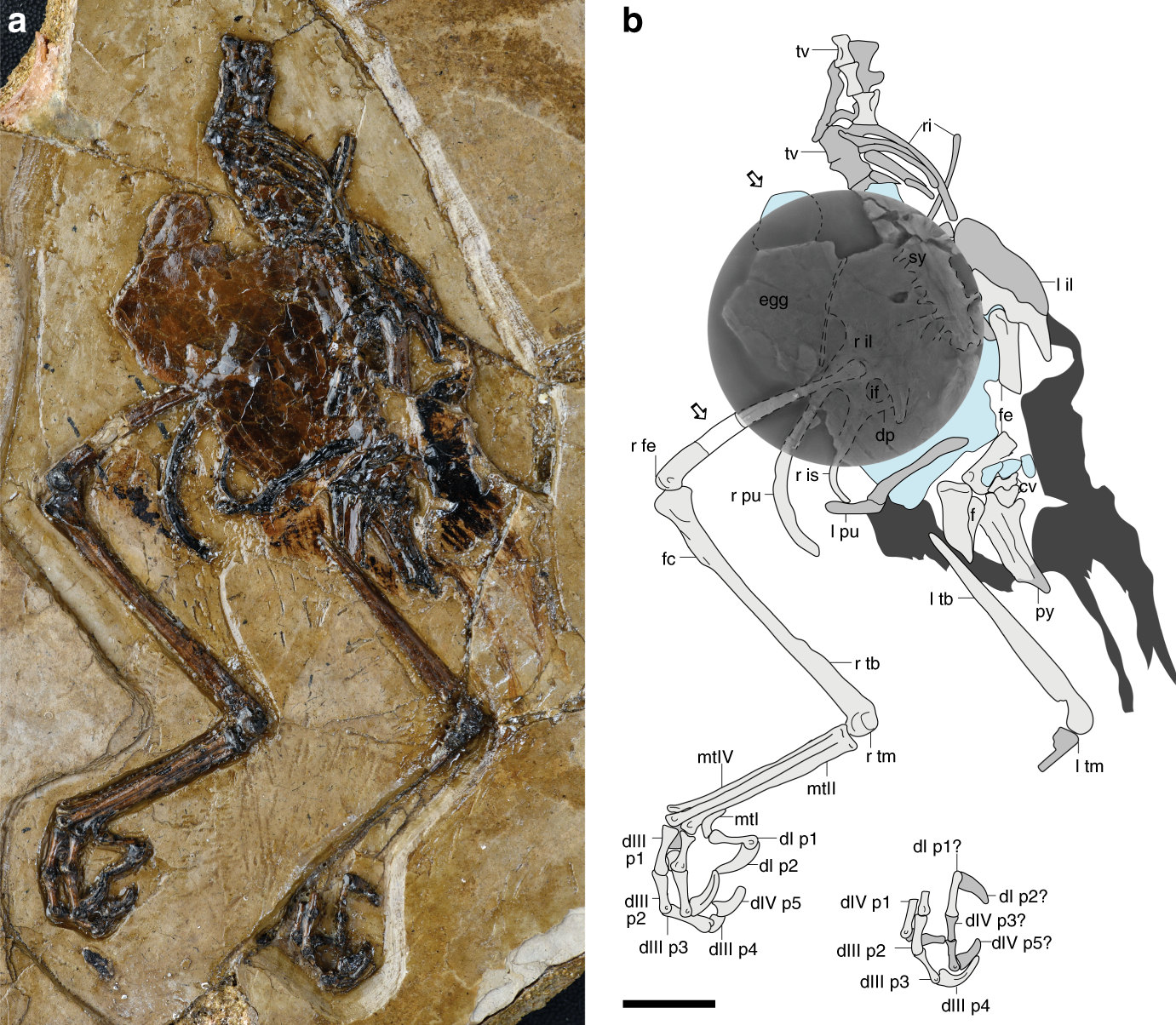

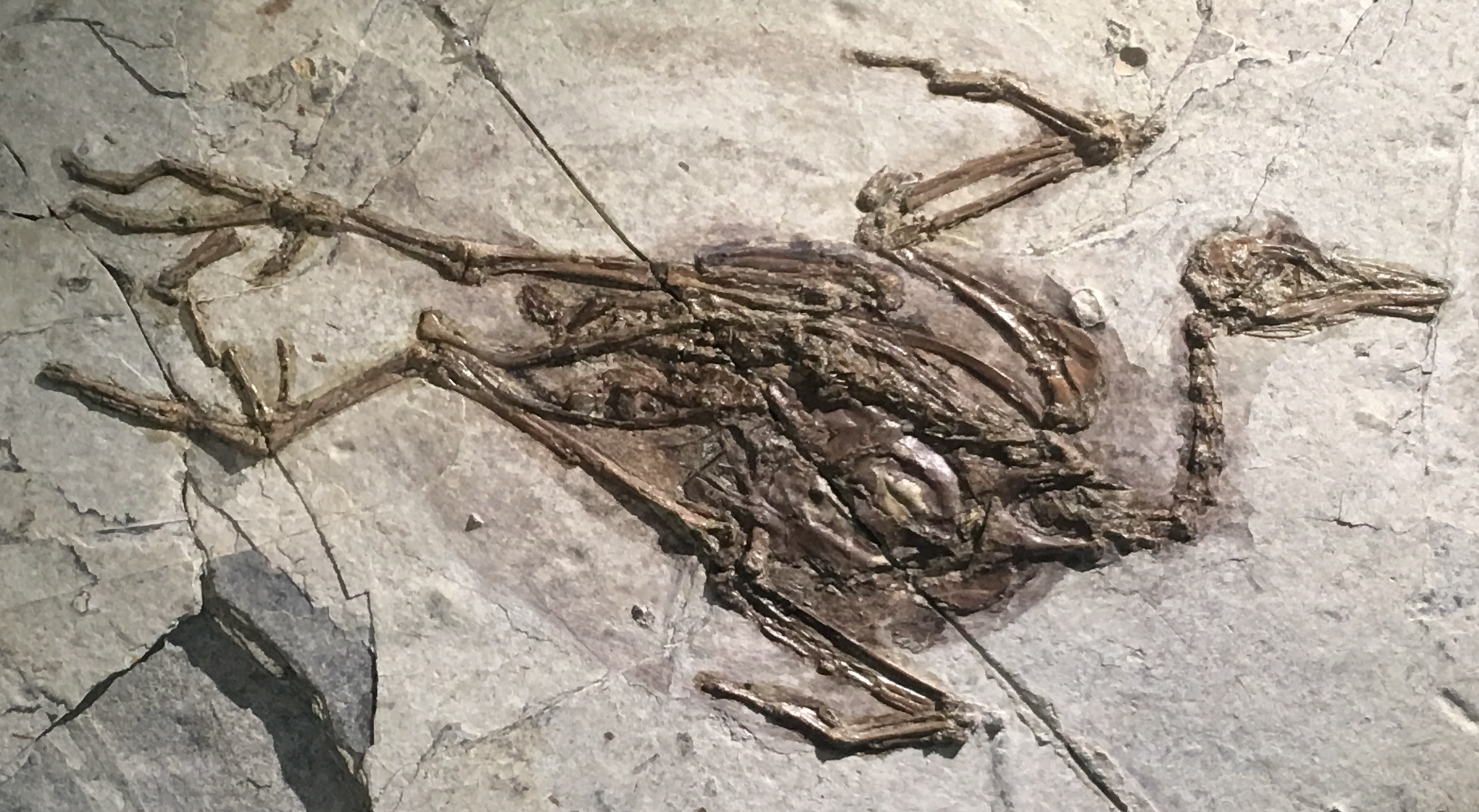
Two well-preserved birds from the Xiagou Formation: Avimaia (top) and Gansus (bottom)

The fauna present in the Xinminbao Group are hypothesized to be the ecological successors to the much more famous Jehol biota, which existed in China during the Barremian and the early Aptian. This fauna, called the "Mazongshan fauna" by some authors, consists of mostly dinosaurs, because the rocks of the Xiagou Formation mostly preserve large vertebrates. There is a major exception to this trend, which are birds. There are numerous well-preserved bird fossils in the Mazongshan biota, most of which are enantiornithines, with relatively few ornithuromorphs. There are also some fish and arthropod fossils preserved in the region.

The most numerous remains found in the region are non-avian dinosaurs. Of these, small ceratopsians were the most abundant, and account for the greatest number of fossils. There are also basal hadrosauroids, titanosauriform sauropods, and large herbivorous ornithomimosaurs and therizinosaurs. Other fragmentary remains have been attributed to oviraptorosaurs, but these have been called into question by some authors.

Xiongguanlong is known to have coexisted with the large ornithomimosaur, Beishanlong, which was found at the same locality, and some museum mounts depict a predator-prey relationship between these animals. Other contemporaneous animals included the ornithopods, Xuwulong and Jintasaurus, the euhelopodid, Qiaowanlong, and the therizinosaur, Suzhousaurus. The small neoceratopsian Archaeoceratops is also present in the area. Enantiornithine birds were abundant and included genera such as Avimaia, Feitianius, and several unnamed forms, and they were accompanied by early euornithean birds such as the duck-like Gansus and the unusual toothed Brevidentavis. Several turtle skeletons have also been found.

== See also ==
- 2009 in archosaur paleontology
- Gansu Provincial Museum
- Lagerstätte
- Sino-Swedish Expedition
- Timeline of tyrannosaur research
