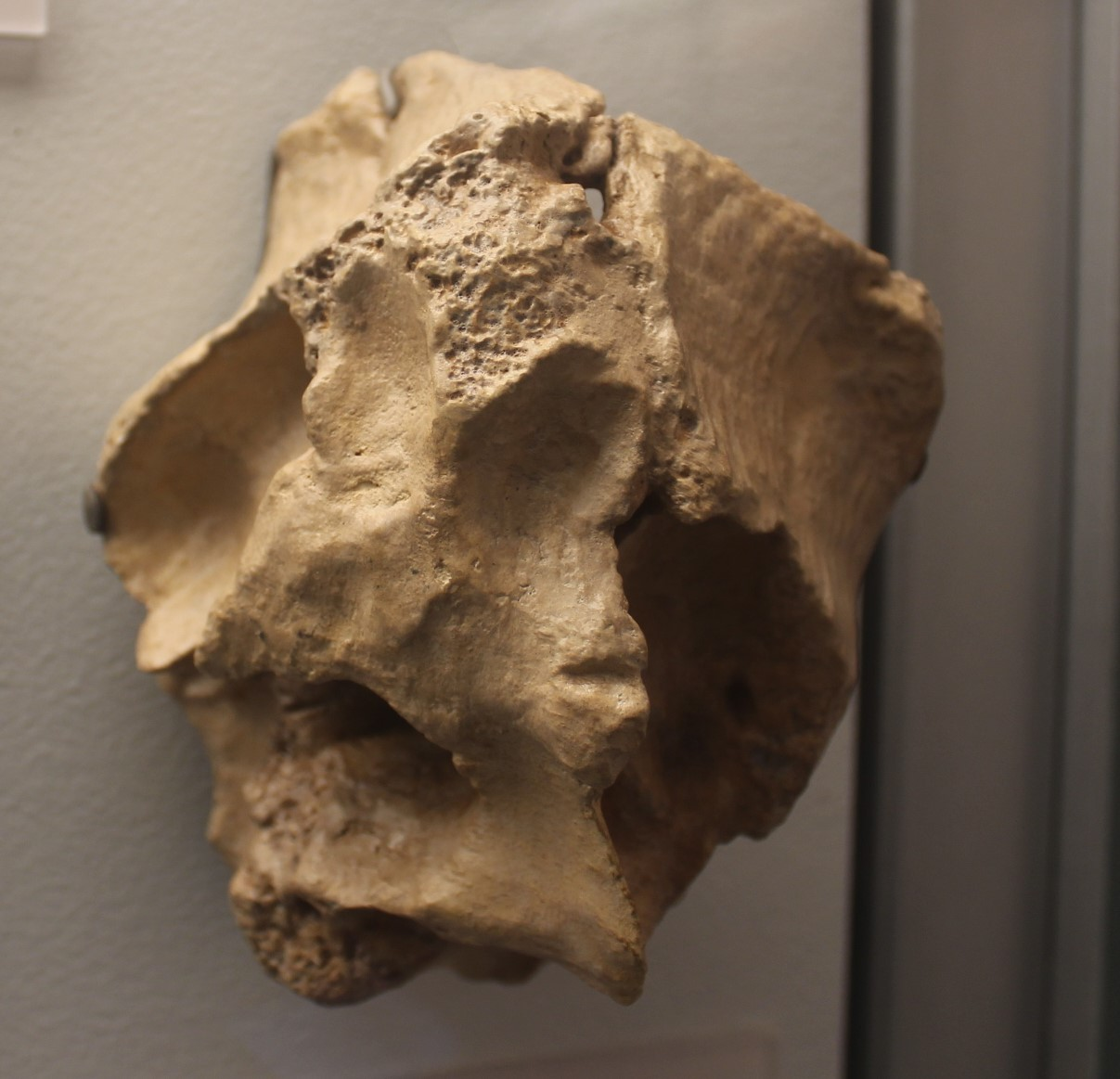
- Cast of holotype braincase, National Museum of Natural History

Scientific classification
- Kingdom: Animalia
- Phylum: Chordata
- Class: Reptilia
- Clade: Dinosauria
- Clade: Saurischia
- Clade: Theropoda
- Superfamily: †Tyrannosauroidea
- Clade: †Pantyrannosauria
- Genus: †Timurlengia; Brusatte et al., 2016
- Species: †T. euotica

Binomial name
- †Timurlengia euotica Brusatte et al., 2016

= Timurlengia =

Timurlengia Temporal range: Late Cretaceous, 92–90 Ma

Extinct genus of tyrannosauroid dinosaurs

Timurlengia is an extinct genus of tyrannosauroid dinosaurs known from the early Late Cretaceous (Turonian age) Bissekty Formation of the Kyzylkum Desert in Uzbekistan. The genus contains a single species, Timurlengia euotica, named in 2016 based on a braincase and numerous single bones of many individuals.

Timurlengia is part of a grade of early-diverging tyrannosauroids preceding the later and larger tyrannosaurids such as Tyrannosaurus. As such, it helps elucidate the early evolution of the anatomy of these animals. In particular, it shows that these species developed their large heads and sophisticated hearing abilities before their large bodies, which only happened in the last 20 million years of the clade's evolution. Timurlengia was likely a pursuit hunter that could hear low-frequency sounds based on the shape of its ear canal.

== Discovery ==
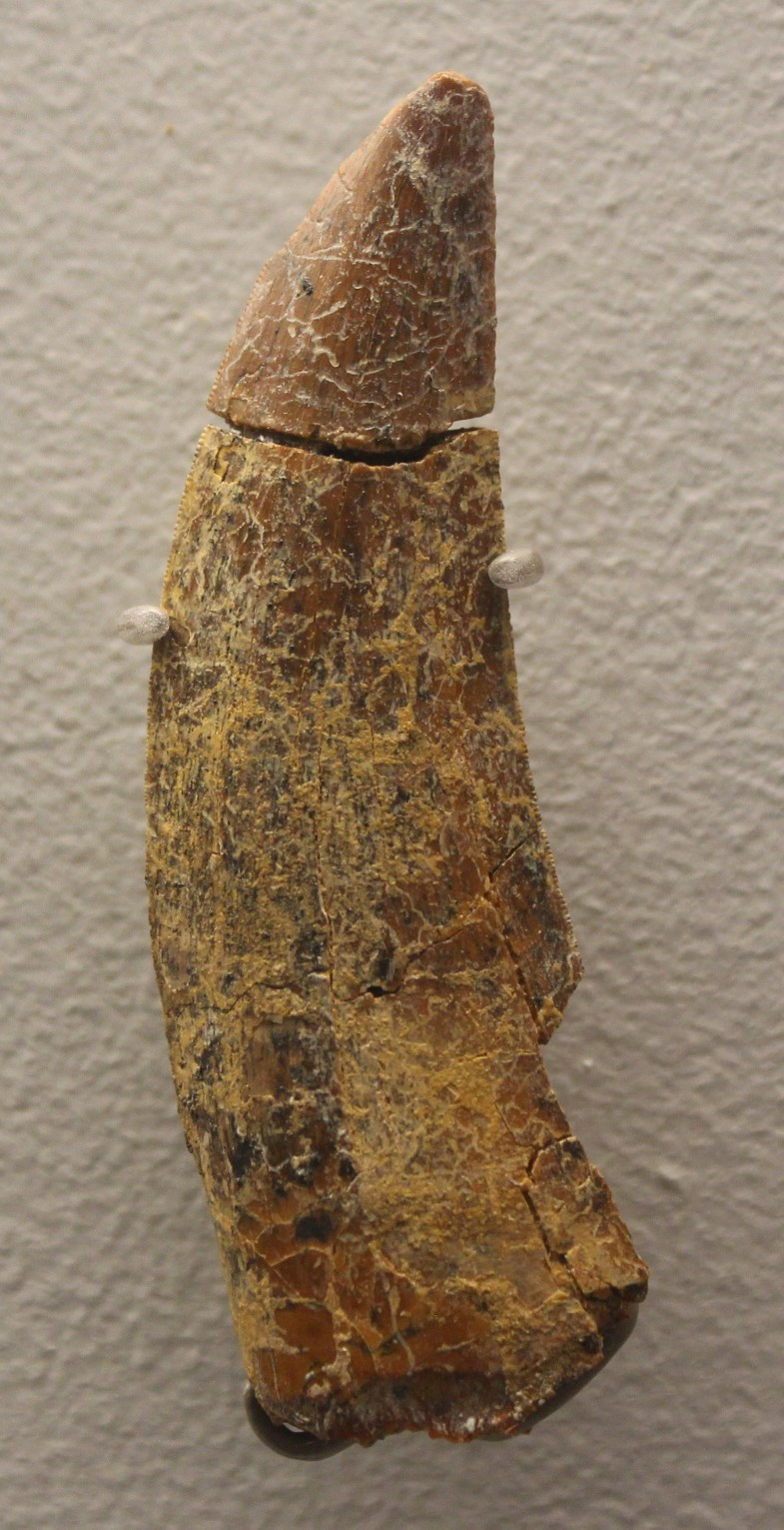
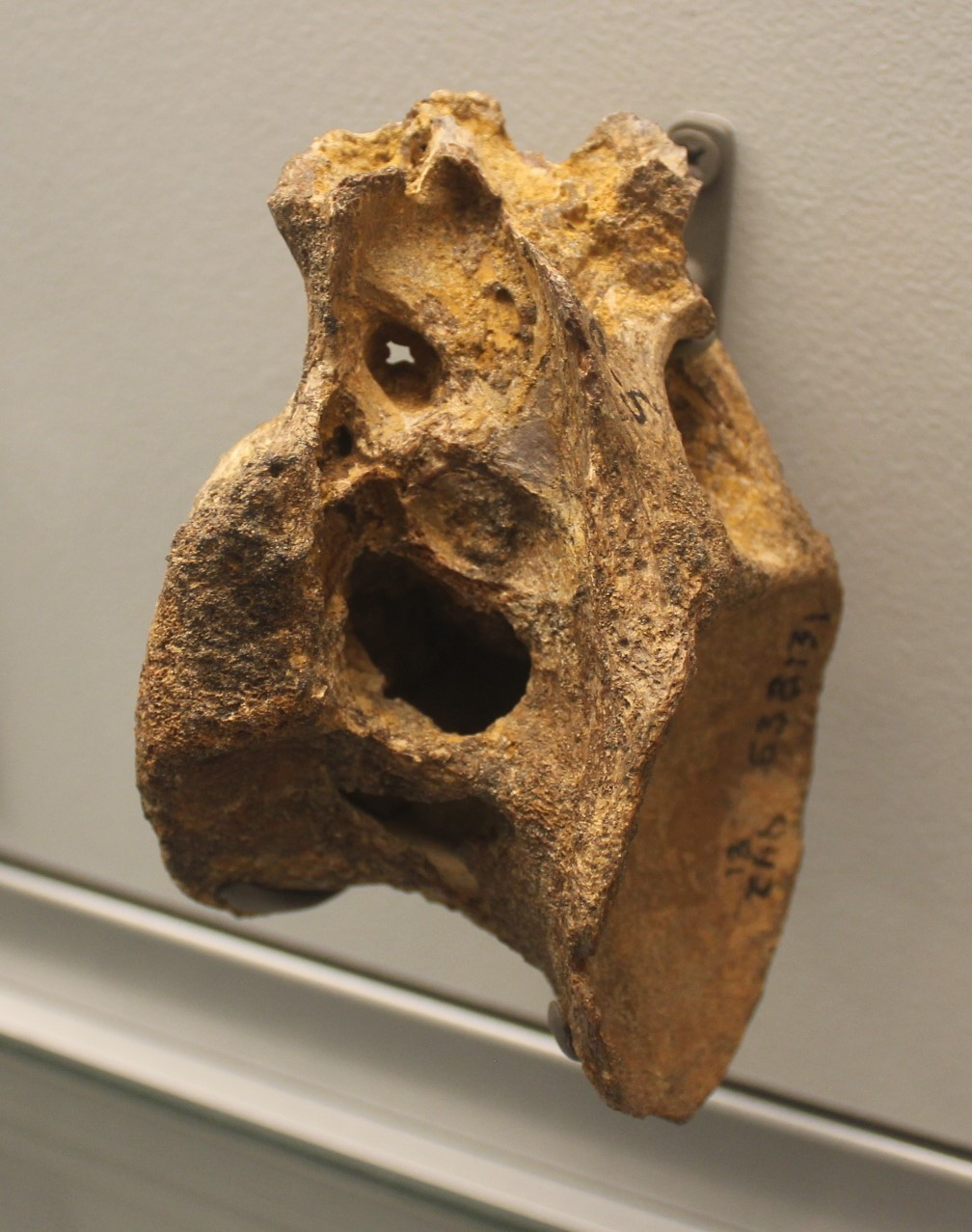
Tooth (left) and cervical vertebra (middle), NMNH

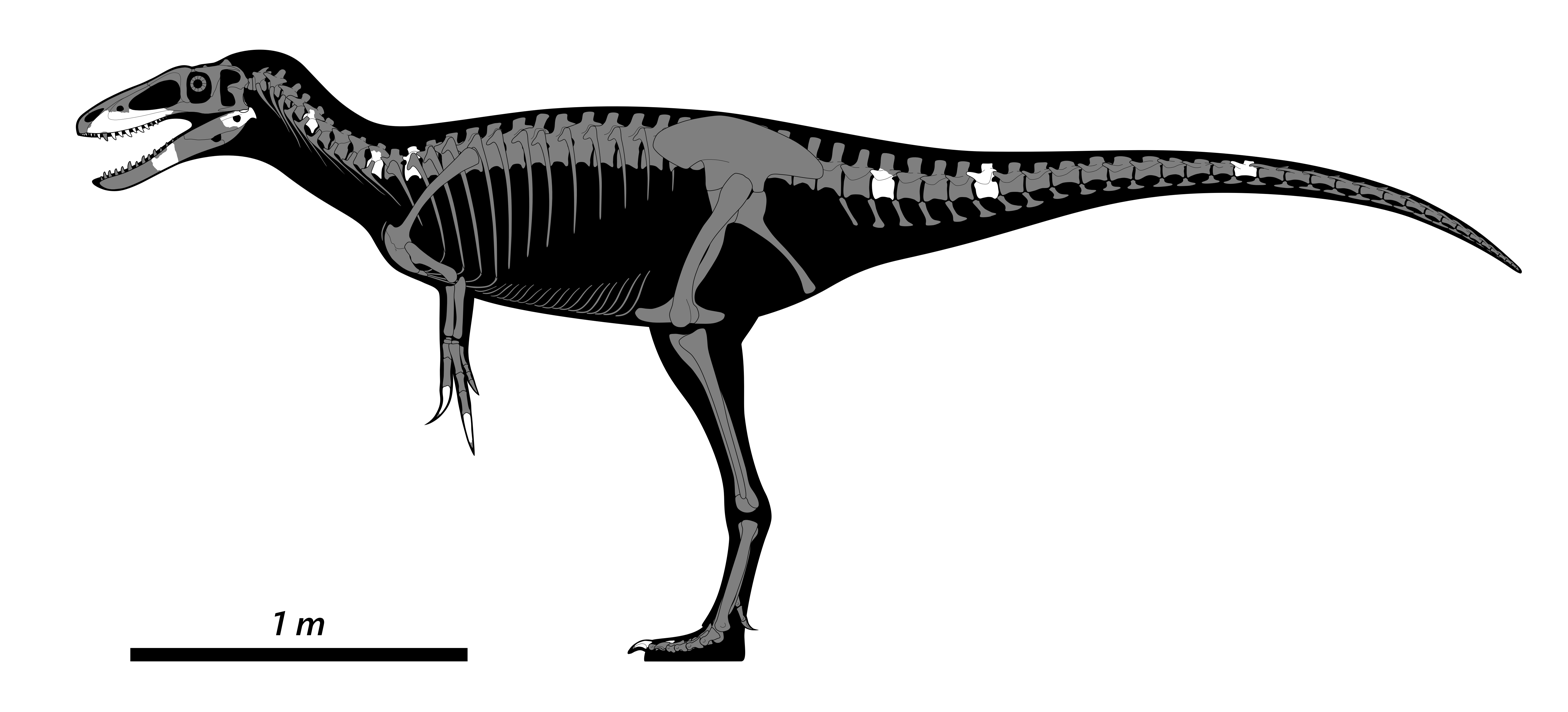
Skeletal diagram with the holotype and referred specimens in white

From 1944 onwards, tyrannosauroid fossil material consisting of single bones has been described from the Bissekty Formation by Soviet or Russian researchers. In 2004 an international team discovered a braincase. The braincase was housed at the Zoological Institute of the Russian Academy of Sciences, where tyrannosaur expert Stephen L. Brusatte, identified it as a new species in 2014.

In 2016, Stephen L. Brusatte, Alexander Averianov, Hans-Dieter Sues, Amy Muir, and Ian B. Butler named and described the type species Timurlengia euotica. The genus is named after Timurlenk, founder of the Timurid Empire in Central Asia. The specific name euotica is Greek for "well-eared", because detailed CT scans show that Timurlengia had a well-developed inner ear for hearing low-frequency sounds.

The species was based on the holotype specimen, ZIN PH 1146/16, an isolated braincase. Other bones described in 2012 that do not belong to a single individual were referred to the species. These include the specimens ZIN PH 854/16: the right half of a braincase; ZIN PH 676/16: a right maxilla; ZIN PH 2330/16: a left frontal bone; ZIN PH 2296/16: a left quadrate; ZIN PH 15/16: a piece of a right dentary; ZIN PH 1239/16: a right articular with angular; ZIN PH 671/16: an anterior cervical vertebra; USNM 538131: a posterior cervical vertebra; USNM 538132: the neural arch of anterior dorsal vertebra; CCMGE 432/12457: a mid-dorsal vertebra; ZIN PH 951/16: an anterior tail vertebra; ZIN PH 120/16: a mid-caudal vertebra; ZIN PH 507/16: a posterior caudal vertebra; ZINPH 619/16: a hand claw; and USNM 538167: a toe claw. These fossils were referred to a single tyrannosauroid taxon because no other tyrannosauroid is known from the Bissekty Formation. However, specimen ZIN PH 2330/16 was suggested to be a dromaeosaurid instead by Voris et al. (2025).

== Description ==
Size compared to a human

The holotype specimen belongs to a subadult about 3–4 m (9.8–13.1 ft) long and weighing around 170–270 kg (370–600 lb). ZIN PH 1239/16 represents a larger, adult individual.

In 2016, several distinguishing traits were established, all relating to the holotype braincase. The supraoccipital bone has a diamond-shaped process pointing below and not reaching the upper rim of the foramen magnum. The basioccipital has very short basal tubers, only attaining a third of the height of the occipital condyle. The oval window and the ear vestibule form a funnel-shaped recess and has a wide exit on the side wall of the braincase. The inner ear is large with prominent semicircular canals.

== Phylogeny ==
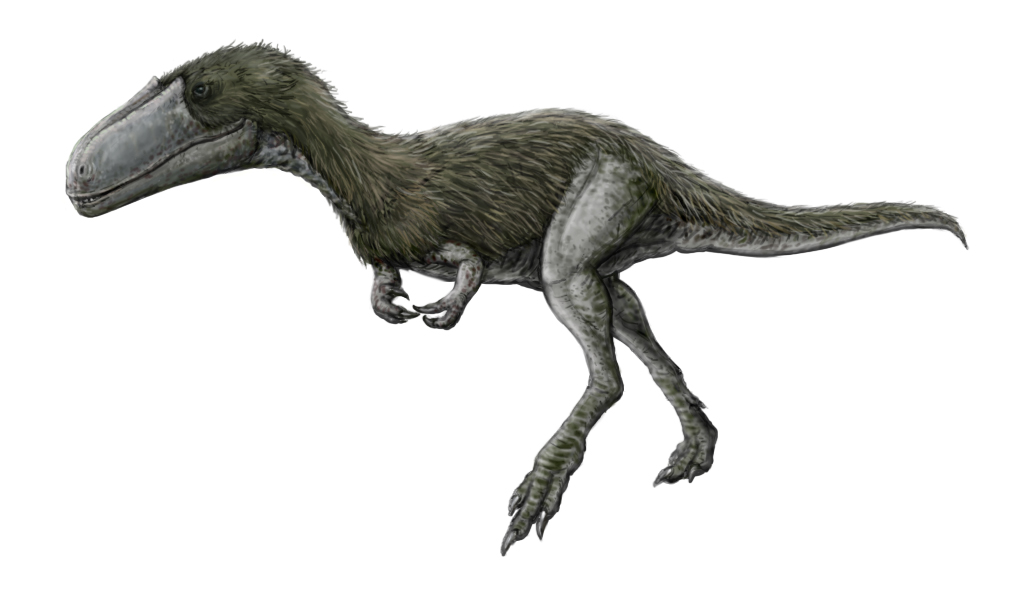
Speculative life restoration

Timurlengia was placed in the Tyrannosauroidea, in a basal position, as a possible sister species of Xiongguanlong. Together they may represent a clade of long-snouted forms that might have been the sister group of the Tyrannosauridae.

The genus is important in showing how earlier small tyrannosauroids evolved into the large Tyrannosauridae like Tyrannosaurus, typical of the Late Cretaceous period of Asia and North America. The species is not believed to be a direct ancestor of Tyrannosaurus. Timurlengia lived ninety million years ago, in the middle-late Turonian age of the early Late Cretaceous, right before the rise of the advanced tyrannosaurids. There had been a twenty million year "tyrannosaur gap" in the fossil records of the tyrannosauroid timeline, between the small "marginal hunters" and the "apex predators" of the tyrannosaurid group. The discovery of Timurlengia has filled that gap. Timurlengia reveals that tyrannosaurs had yet to achieve huge size at this time but had already evolved key brain and sensory features of the gigantic latest Cretaceous species. These features were originally thought to be unique to big tyrannosaurs, as they evolved into large animals. Tyrannosaurs apparently developed huge size rapidly during the late Cretaceous, and their success in the top predator role may have been enabled by their brain and keen senses which first evolved at a smaller body size. Timurlengia's small size indicates that tyrannosaurs only evolved their large size in the last twenty million years of their evolution. It is unknown what precisely triggered the size increase.

The braincase of Timurlengia shows that tyrannosaurs likely developed their advanced head first, as hypothesised by Hans-Dieter Sues, one of the fossil's describers. Timurlengia’s skull, though much smaller than that of Tyrannosaurus, shows a sophisticated brain that would have led to keen eyesight, smell and hearing. At the time tyrannosaurs were developing acute senses and cognitive abilities, other large meat-eating dinosaurs such as the Carnosauria were disappearing from the environment or dying out, creating a vacant niche, allowing tyrannosaurs to become apex predators. The head of Timurlengia is far less pneumatised than that of the larger tyrannosaurids; the increased airspaces with the later forms might have been an adaptation to lighten the skull or to increase hearing ability.

== Classification ==
Below is a cladogram based on the results of a phylogenetic analysis by Wolfe et al. (2019), illustrating on the placement of Timurlengia.

- - Tyrannosauroidea
    - Proceratosauridae
    - - - Stokesosaurus
        - Juratyrant
        - Eotyrannus
      - - Suskityrannus
        - - Timurlengia
          - - Xiongguanlong
            - - Dryptosaurus
              - - Appalachiosaurus
                - - Bistahieversor
                  - Tyrannosauridae

== Paleobiology ==
Based on the known material, Timurlengia was likely a pursuit hunter with blade-like teeth for slicing through meat. The robustness of the semicircular inner ear canals might be related to greater agility. Timurlengia has a long cochlear duct, with the same height as the labyrinth, an adaptation to hearing low-frequency sounds. This might be an indication that the animal used low calls to communicate within the species.

== See also ==
- Timeline of tyrannosaur research
- 2016 in paleontology
