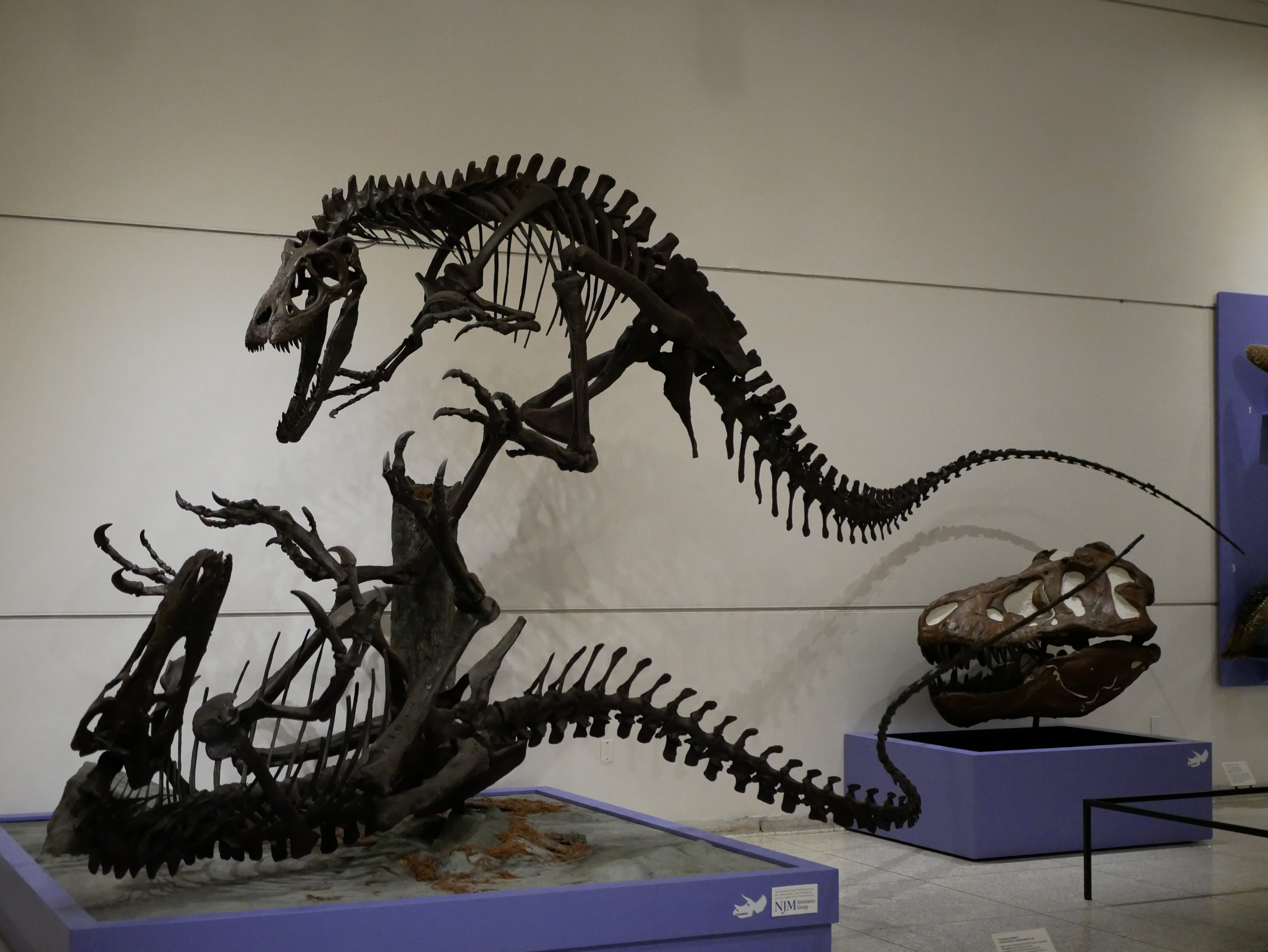
- Reconstructed skeletons mounted in fighting poses, New Jersey State Museum.

Scientific classification
- Kingdom: Animalia
- Phylum: Chordata
- Class: Reptilia
- Clade: Dinosauria
- Clade: Saurischia
- Clade: Theropoda
- Superfamily: †Tyrannosauroidea
- Clade: †Eutyrannosauria
- Family: †Dryptosauridae; Marsh, 1890
- Genus: †Dryptosaurus; Marsh, 1877
- Species: †D. aquilunguis

Binomial name
- †Dryptosaurus aquilunguis (Cope, 1866 [originally Laelaps])

Synonyms
- Laelaps aquilunguis Cope, 1866 (preoccupied); Megalosaurus aquilunguis (Cope, 1866)

= Dryptosaurus =

Dryptosaurus Temporal range: Late Cretaceous, 67–66 Ma Possible Campanian record

Extinct genus of dinosaurs

Dryptosaurus (/ˌdrɪptoʊˈsɔːrəs/ DRIP-toh-SOR-əs; meaning "tearing lizard") is a genus of theropod dinosaur that lived in the present-day East Coast of the United States during the Late Cretaceous period. The type, and only, species, D. aquilunguis was described by Edward Drinker Cope in 1866 as Laelaps aquilunguis, however the genus name was preoccupied by a mite. As a result, Cope's rival in the Bone Wars, Othniel Marsh, replaced the genus name with Dryptosaurus. Dryptosaurus is known from a single, fragmentary skeleton including parts of the mandible (lower jaw), limbs, and vertebrae. These fossils were unearthed by fertilizer miners in New Jersey in rock layers of the New Egypt Formation. This formation dates to the late Maastrichtian stage of the Late Cretaceous, around 67 to 66 million years ago. Several other fragmentary remains have been assigned to Dryptosaurus, however their referral is uncertain.

Like other tyrannosaurs, Dryptosaurus was a bipedal carnivore with a long tail and elongated skull. Unlike other tyrannosaurs like Tyrannosaurus and Tarbosaurus, Dryptosaurus possessed large forelimbs ending in large claws and lithe hindlimbs. Size estimates place it at 7.5 metres (25 ft) in length and 756–1,500 kilograms (1,667–3,307 lb) in mass. The genus had ziphodont (sharp, blade-like, laterally compressed) dentition, dissimilar to that of larger tyrannosaurs.

Dryptosaurus is a member of Eutyrannosauria, the clade including Tyrannosauridae and tyrannosaurs like Nanotyrannus and Bistahieversor but excluding more basal tyrannosaurs like Dilong. This puts Dryptosaurus in an intermediate position between lithe, early tyrannosaurs and the large tyrannosaurids. However, some studies have also put it in its own family, Dryptosauridae, or in Nanotyrannidae. Dryptosaurus is one of few Cretaceous dinosaurs known from the Eastern United States. During the Late Cretaceous, North America was divided into two continents; Appalachia and Laramidia. The breakup of North America into these continents spurred the evolution of unique characteristics in Appalachian tyrannosaurs not observed in Laramidian tyrannosaurs. Fossils of Dryptosaurus are known from the marine New Egypt Formation where dinosaur bodies floated out to sea and became fossilized. Mosasaurs, fish, sharks, and other marine fauna are represented in this formation.

== Discovery and species ==
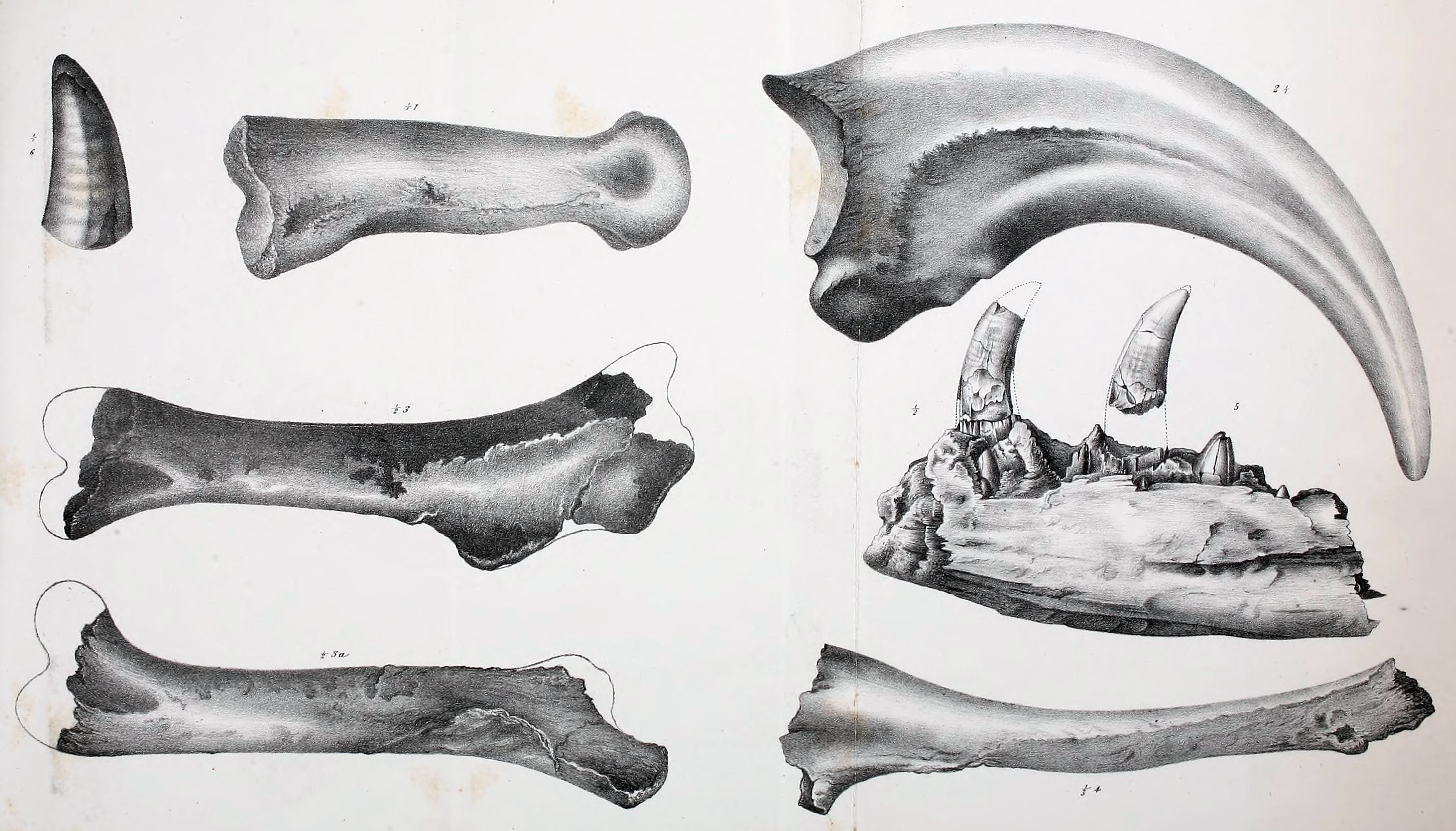
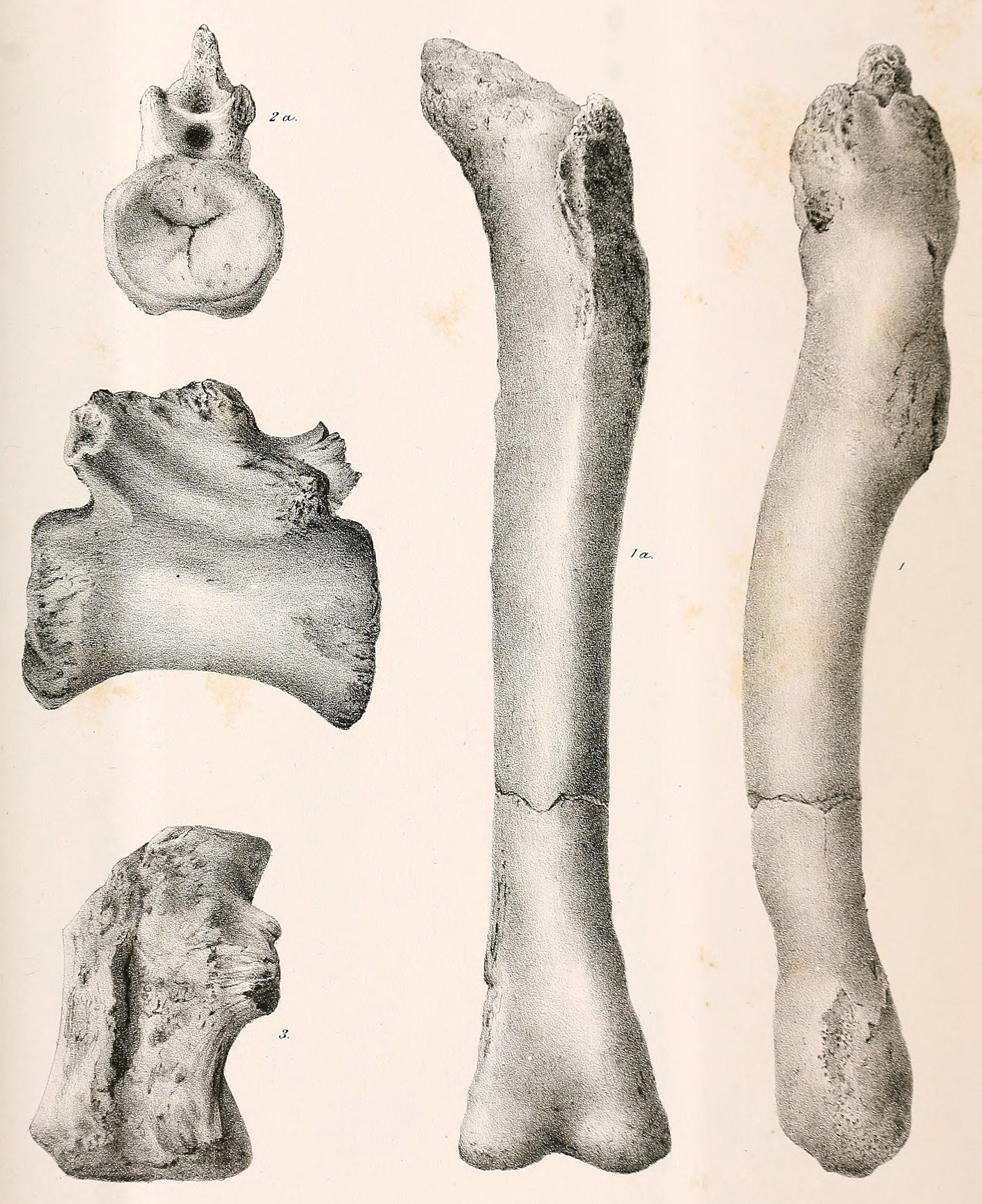
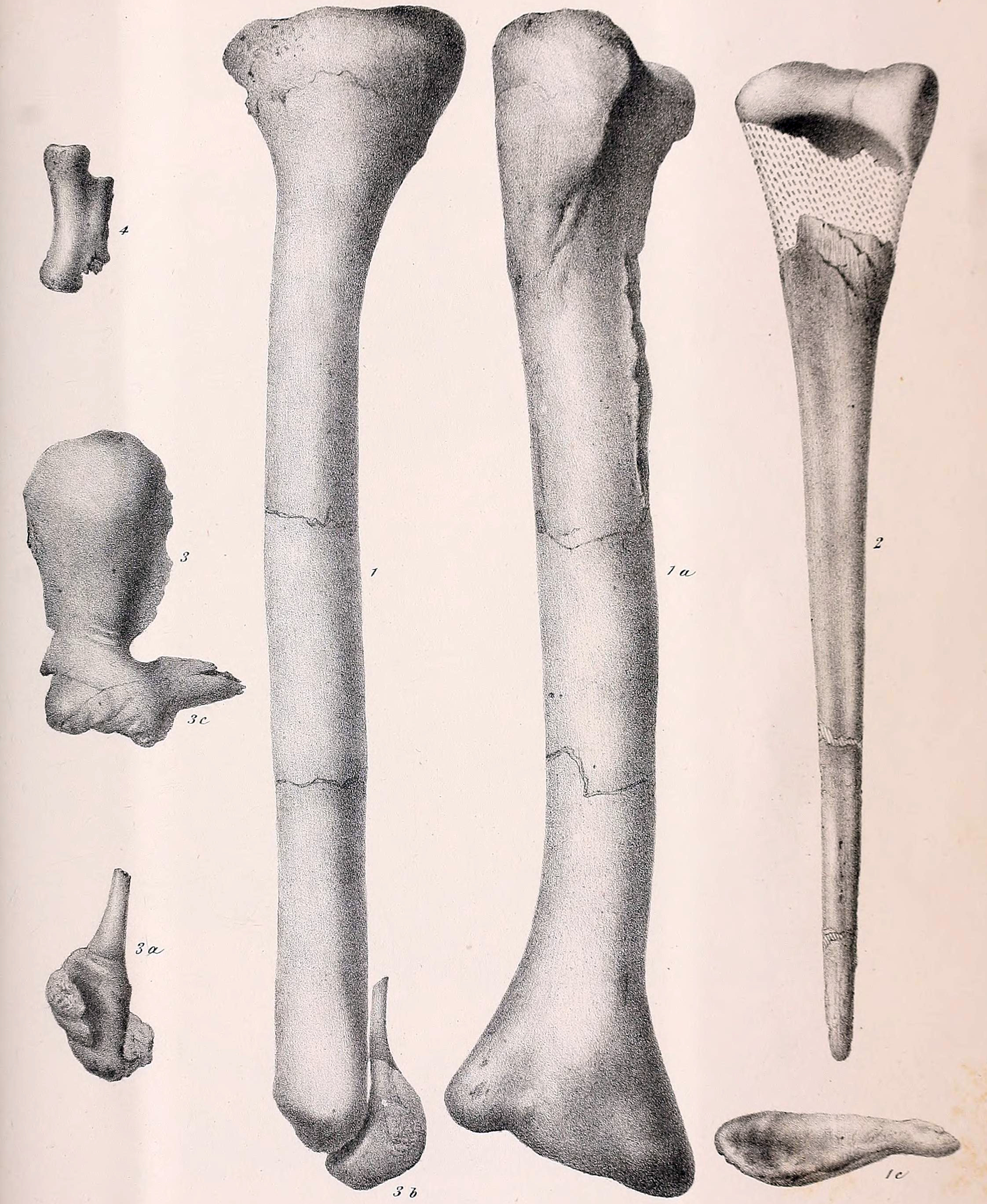
1871 lithographs showing elements of the type specimen

Up until 1866, theropods from the United States were only known from isolated teeth discovered by Ferdinand Van Hayden during Geological Survey excursions into Montana. During the summer of 1866, workers from the West Jersey Marl Company uncovered an associated theropod skeleton in sediments coming from the New Egypt Formation in a quarry near Barnsboro, New Jersey. This formation dates to the Maastrichtian stage of the Late Cretaceous period and is part of the Monmouth Group. In August 1866, American paleontologist Edward Drinker Cope was notified of the discovery and encouraged to visit the marl pit to obtain the specimen. When he arrived, he was thoroughly surprised by the skeleton's completeness and uniqueness, calling it the "finest discovery I have yet made". The skeleton was then deposited at the Academy of Natural Sciences in Philadelphia under the catalogue number ANSP 9995 and includes; skull and dentary fragments, teeth, caudal vertebrae, humeri, an incomplete manus, a partial pelvis, and nearly complete left hindlimb. However, four chevrons, a sternum, and a scapula were also noted by Cope, however they have since been lost. Several sacral vertebrae Cope assigned to Dryptosaurus are now believed to belong to the protostegid turtle Pneumatoarthrus. An isolated metatarsal IV (AMNH FARB 2438) possibly belonging to ANSP 9995 was found at the same locale, but this has come into question. It was in Cope's possession and purchased by the American Museum of Natural History in 1902, however it was not mentioned by Cope until an 1870 paper. Brusatte et al. (2011) noted that well-preserved, historic casts of most of the type material from ANSP 9995 and AMNH FARB 2438 are housed in the collections of the Natural History Museum in London (NHM OR50100). The casts show some detail that is no longer preserved on the original specimens, which have significantly degraded due to pyrite disease. Some of the bones have evidence of molding, which was possibly done by Benjamin Waterhouse Hawkins during his failed project to erect a Paleozoic Museum in Central Park, New York.

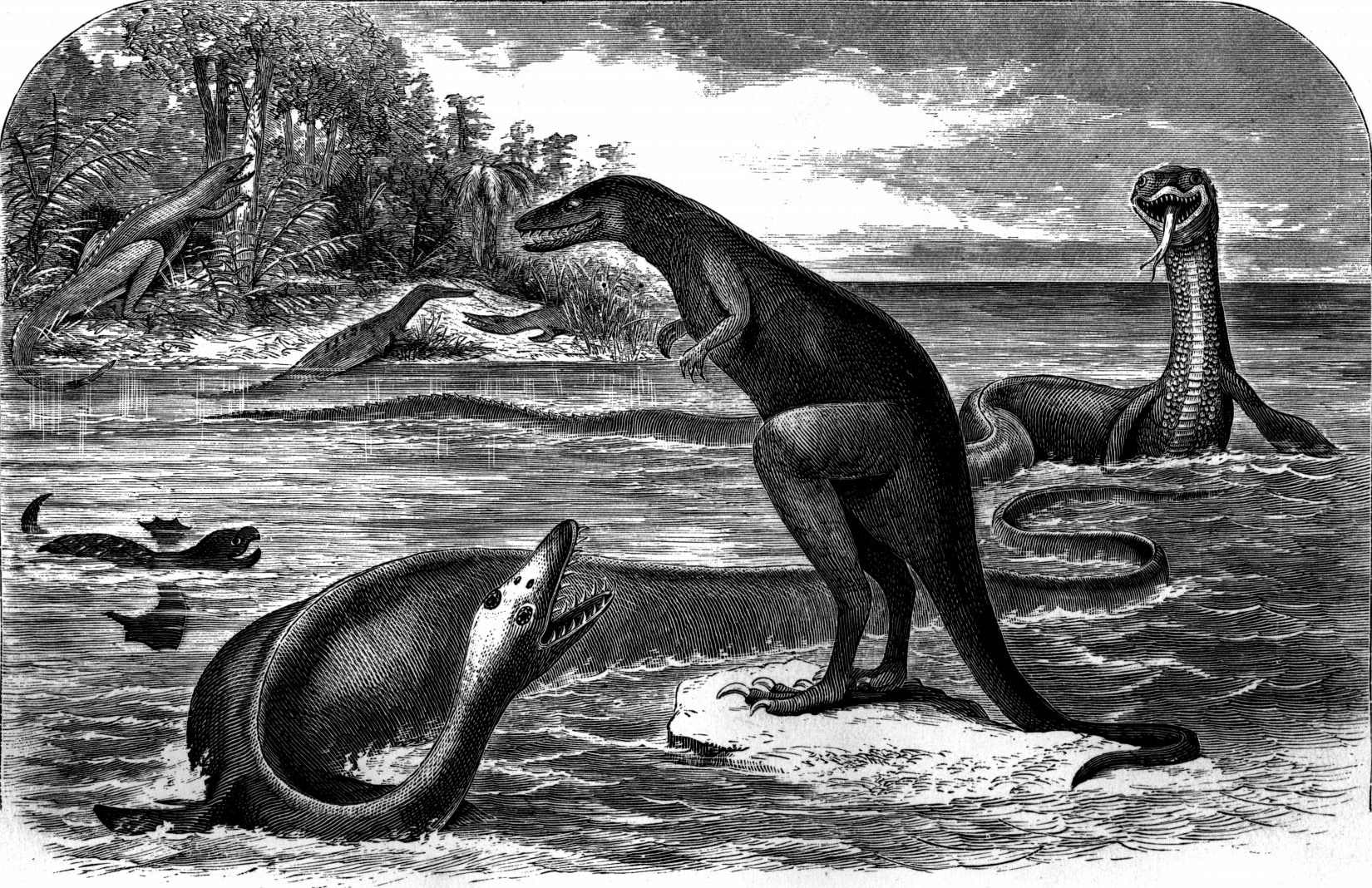
An outdated artist's impression of Dryptosaurus (center) confronting Elasmosaurus, with Mosasaurus, Osteopygis, Thoracosaurus and two Hadrosaurus in the background. Illustration for an article by Edward Drinker Cope in The American Naturalist, April 1869.

On 21 August 1866, Cope presented his description of ANSP 9995 to the American Philosophical Society at what is now the Academy of Natural Sciences, naming it a new genus and species of dinosaur, Laelaps aquilunguis. "Laelaps", which is derived from the Greek word "hurricane" or "storm wind", was also the name of a dog in Greek mythology who never failed to catch what it was hunting. In the 1870s, conflict began between Cope and another American paleontologist, Othniel Charles Marsh, leading to the onset of the Bone Wars. In 1877, Marsh pointed out that Cope's genus name Laelaps was preoccupied by a genus of mite, leading to Marsh to erect the genus name Dryptosaurus. This name derives from the Greek δρύπτω drypto "tear" and σαῦρος sauros "lizard", creating "tearing reptile". Despite this, Cope continued to use the name Laelaps, refusing to use Dryptosaurus. The discovery of this genus gave North American paleontologists the opportunity to observe an articulated, albeit incomplete, theropod skeleton. During the late 19th century, this genus became a wastebasket taxon for the referral of isolated theropod elements from across North America, given that Tyrannosauroidea was not recognized as a distinct group of large theropods at the time and numerous theropod species were assigned to it (often as Lælaps or Laelaps), only to be later reclassified.

=== Other species ===
==== Dubious species ====
- Laelaps trihedrodon was first discovered by Oramel W. Lucas, a schoolteacher from Garden Park, Colorado, who collected an incomplete dentary with teeth from 1877 to 1878 in strata of the Late Jurassic-aged Morrison Formation in Garden Park. Cope described this material as belonging to a new species of Laelaps, Laelaps trihedrodon, "three-hedged tooth", in 1877. Additionally, Cope assigned five teeth, a femur, and some skull fragments to the species, however all of these fossils, including the holotype dentary, but the five teeth have since been lost. The lost fossils were originally part of Cope's personal collection, however when his collection was purchased by the American Museum of Natural History in 1903, none of the fossils but the teeth could be located. Cope, as in many of his descriptions, failed to figure or meticulously describe the L. trihedrodon holotype. In a 1939 catalog, Oskar Kuhn listed the species as Antrodemus (?) trihedrodon, while listing Allosaurus as a synonym of Antrodemus. In 2001, Chure argued that AMNH 5780 probably belongs to Allosaurus.
- In 1865, Joseph Leidy described two theropod tibia that had been found in the Maastrichtian-aged Navesink Formation of New Jersey as belonging to a new genus and species of dinosaur, Coelosaurus antiquus. Along with the tibiae, Leidy assigned several fossils from the same site, consisting of an incomplete right tibia (AMNH 2550), the proximal (close to body) end of a right metatarsal II or IV (AMNH 2553), the distal (away from body) end of a right metatarsal II (AMNH 2552), and three pedal phalanges (AMNH 2551), as a syntypse of the species. However, in 1868 Cope described this specimen (AMNH 2550-2553) as belonging to its own species of Laelaps (Dryptosaurus) which he named L. macropus. Thomas R. Holtz listed it as an indeterminate tyrannosauroid in his contribution to the second edition of the Dinosauria. In 2017, Chan-gyu Yun informally gave it the new generic name Teihivenator, stating that it was its own genus of tyrannosauroid. However that same year Chase Brownstein argued that "Teihivenator macropus" is actually a chimera and a nomen dubium. Brownstein stated that only the partial right tibia could definitely be considered tyrannosauroid, whereas the metatarsal fragments came from either a tyrannosauroid or an ornithomimosaur and the pedal phalanges were ornithomimosaurian. This makes the specimen invalid and a chimera.
- In 1876, Cope named Laelaps falculus on the basis of ten isolated teeth that had been found by Jno. C. Issac from the "Fort Union Beds" (now considered the Judith River Formation) of Montana dating to the Campanian stage of the Late Cretaceous period. Oliver Hay reclassified L. falculus as a species of Dryptosaurus in 1902, Henry Osborn considered it a species of Deinodon, a dubious genus of tyrannosaurid, that same year, and George Olshevsky placed it as a species of the dromaeosaurid Dromaeosaurus based on the small, thin nature of the teeth. However, L. falculus is a nomen dubium and likely is based on juvenile tyrannosaur teeth.
- In 1876, Cope named Laelaps incrassatus on the basis of two isolated maxillary teeth that had been found by Jno. C. Issac from the "Fort Union Beds" (now considered the Judith River Formation) of Montana dating to the Campanian stage of the Late Cretaceous period. In 1892, Cope assigned two incomplete tyrannosaur skulls from rocks of the Horseshoe Canyon Formation in Alberta, Canada to L. incrassatus on the basis of their similar tooth anatomy. In 1903 and 1904, Lawrence Lambe used the valid generic name Dryptosaurus incrassatus for the skulls, however both of these skulls are now assigned to Albertosaurus sarcophagus, while L. incrassatus is considered a nomen dubium.
- In 1876, Cope named Laelaps explanatus on the basis of several teeth that had been found in rocks of the "Fort Union Beds" (now considered the Judith River Formation) of Montana dating to the Campanian stage of the Late Cretaceous period. It was later classified as a species of Deinodon and Dryptosaurus, however it is now considered a dubious species of tyrannosaurid.
- Laelaps hazenianus was described by Cope in 1876 on the basis of seven teeth from the Judith River Group of Montana dating to the Late Campanian stage of the Late Cretaceous period. It was later classified as a species of Deinodon and Dryptosaurus, however it is now considered a dubious species of tyrannosaurid.

==== Reassigned species ====
- Megalosaurus (Dryptosaurus) saharicus was an alternative combination for Megalosaurus saharicus proposed by Charles Depéret and Justin Savornin in 1927, however it is now classified in its own genus, Carcharodontosaurus.
- Erectopus (Dryptosaurus) superbus was an alternative combination for Megalosaurus superbus proposed by Depéret and Savornin in 1927, however it is now classified in its own genus, Erectopus.

=== Indeterminate remains ===
In 1979, Donald Baird and John R. Horner described a multitude of fossils from the Campanian-aged Tar Heel/Coachman Formation in North Carolina, United States. They assigned several teeth and two femur fragments (ANSP 15330 and USNM 7189; the latter was part of the syntype of the hadrosaur Hypsibema) as belonging to Dryptosaurus or Albertosaurus. In February 2018, based on specimens described by Baird and Horner (1979), Brownstein tentatively classified the partial teeth (USNM 7199 and ANSP 15332) as D. sp. and the partial femur fragments (ANSP 15330 and USNM 7189, the latter of which was in part a syntype of Hypsibema) as D. aquilunguis. He also referred some teeth and fragmentary postcranial material from the Marshalltown Formation to D. sp. In December 2018, he simply referred to these specimens as "material comparable to the tyrannosaur Dryptosaurus aquilunguis", not directly representing Dryptosaurus itself.

It was suggested that the indeterminate specimens from Marshalltown Formation might belong to Appalachiosaurus instead, and most of the putative specimens (ANSP 15330, ANSP 15332 and USNM 7199) from the Tar Heel/Coachman Formation were subsequently referred to as indeterminate Eutyrannosauria separate from Dryptosaurus, with only USNM 7189 tentatively classified as D. sp. ANSP 15330 was simply referred to as a medium-sized theropod without specific classification in a 2023 study.

Several fossils including isolated teeth, postcranial elements, and other fragments from the Upper Cretaceous of New Jersey have been assigned to Dryptosaurus. A 2018 paper tentatively assigned two isolated teeth from the Ellisdale Site in Monmouth County, New Jersey, which contains strata of the Maastrichthian-aged Marshalltown Formation, to Dryptosaurus. The same paper also noted that another morphotype of tyrannosauroid teeth, called Morphotype B, were present and more similar to teeth of Appalachiosaurus than Dryptosaurus.

== Description ==
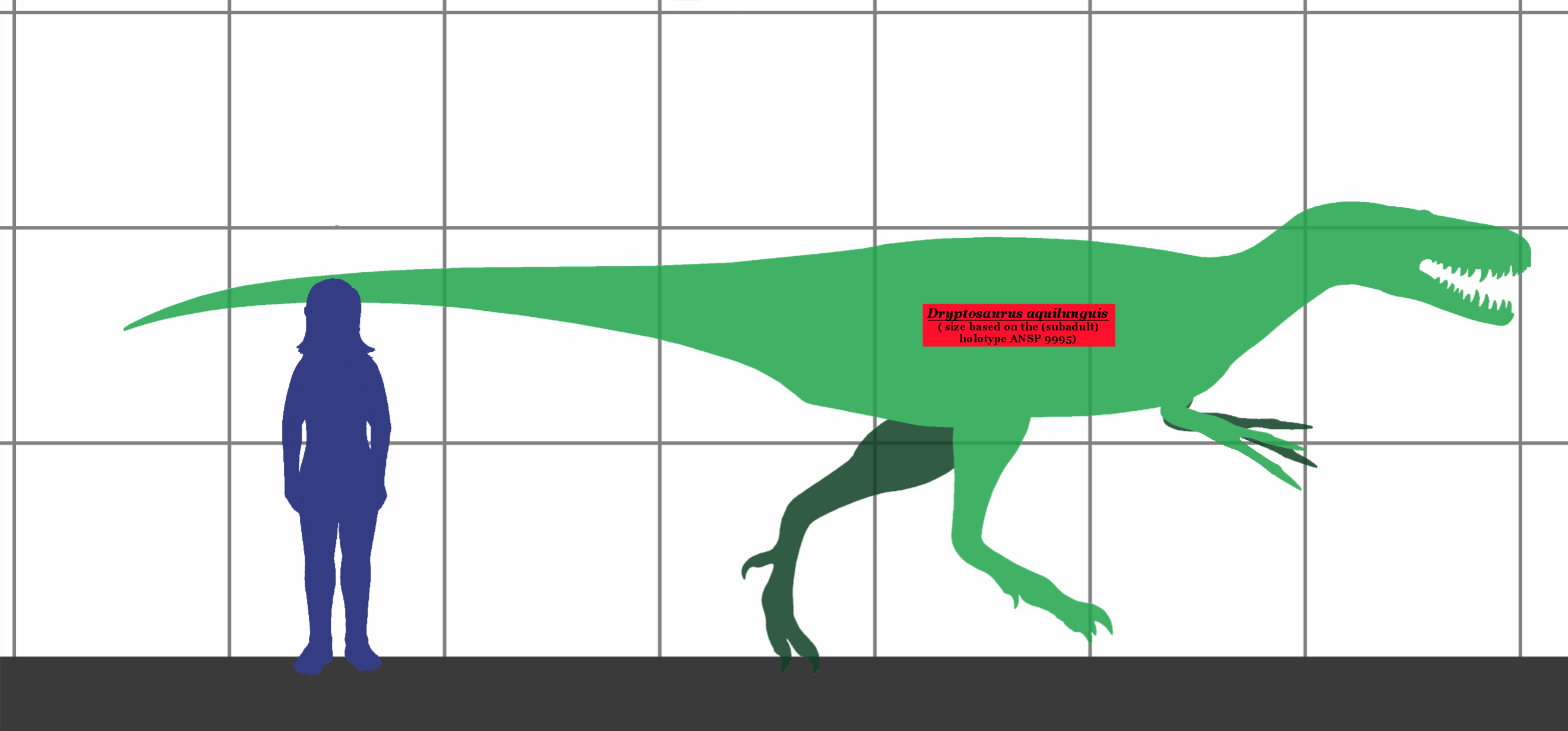
Estimated size, compared to human

Dryptosaurus is estimated to have been 7.5 metres (25 ft) long and 756–1,500 kilograms (1,667–3,307 lb), although this is based on partial remains of one individual. Like its relative Eotyrannus, Dryptosaurus seems to have had relatively long arms when compared with more derived tyrannosaurs, such as Tyrannosaurus. Its hands, which are also relatively large, were once believed to have had three fingers. Brusatte et al. (2011), however, observed an overall similarity in the shape of the available phalanges of Dryptosaurus with those of derived tyrannosaurids and noted that Dryptosaurus may have had only two functional digits. Each of its fingers were tipped with an eight-inch long, talon-like claw. Its arm morphology suggests that arm reduction in tyrannosauroids may not have proceeded in a uniform fashion. Dryptosaurus may have used both its arms and its jaws as weapons when hunting, capturing, and processing its prey.

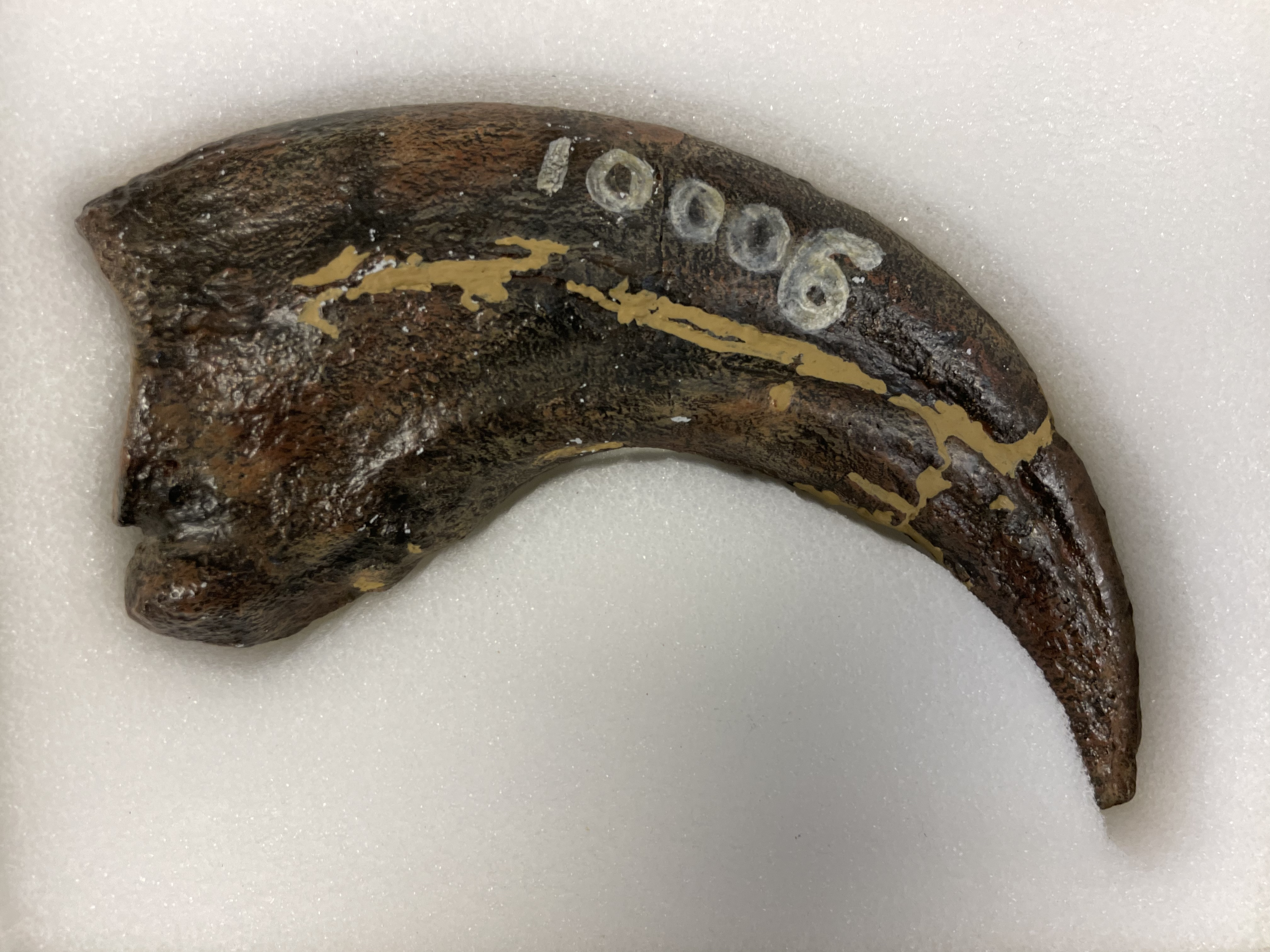
Holotype claw bone

The type specimen is a fragmentary skeleton belonging to a single adult individual, ANSP 9995. ANSP 9995 consists of a fragmentary right maxilla, a fragmentary right dentary, a fragmentary right surangular, lateral teeth, 11 middle-distal caudal vertebrae, both the left and right humeri, three manual phalanges from the left hand (I-1, II-2, and an ungual), the shafts of the left and right pubic bones, a fragmentary right ischium, the left femur, the left tibia, the left fibula, the left astragalus, and a midshaft fragment of metatarsal III. The ontological maturity of the holotype individual is supported by the fact that the neurocentral sutures are closed in all of its caudal vertebrae. AMNH FARB 2438 consists of left metatarsal IV, which are likely from the same individual as the holotype.

The fragmentary right maxilla preserves the three alveoli in full and the fourth only partially. The authors were able to ascertain that Dryptosaurus had ziphodont dentition. The shape of the alveolus situated on the anterior portion of the fragment suggests that it housed a tooth that was smaller and more circular than the others. This incisiform tooth is common among tyrannosauroids. The disarticulated teeth recovered are transversely narrow, serrated (17–18 denticles/cm), and recurved. The femur is only 3% longer than the tibia. The longest manual ungual phalanx recovered measured 176 mm (6.9 in) in length. The morphology of the proximal portion of metatarsal IV suggests that Dryptosaurus had an arctometatarsalian foot, an advanced feature shared by derived tyrannosauroids, such as Albertosaurus and Tyrannosaurus, in which the third metatarsal is "pinched" between the second and fourth metatarsals.

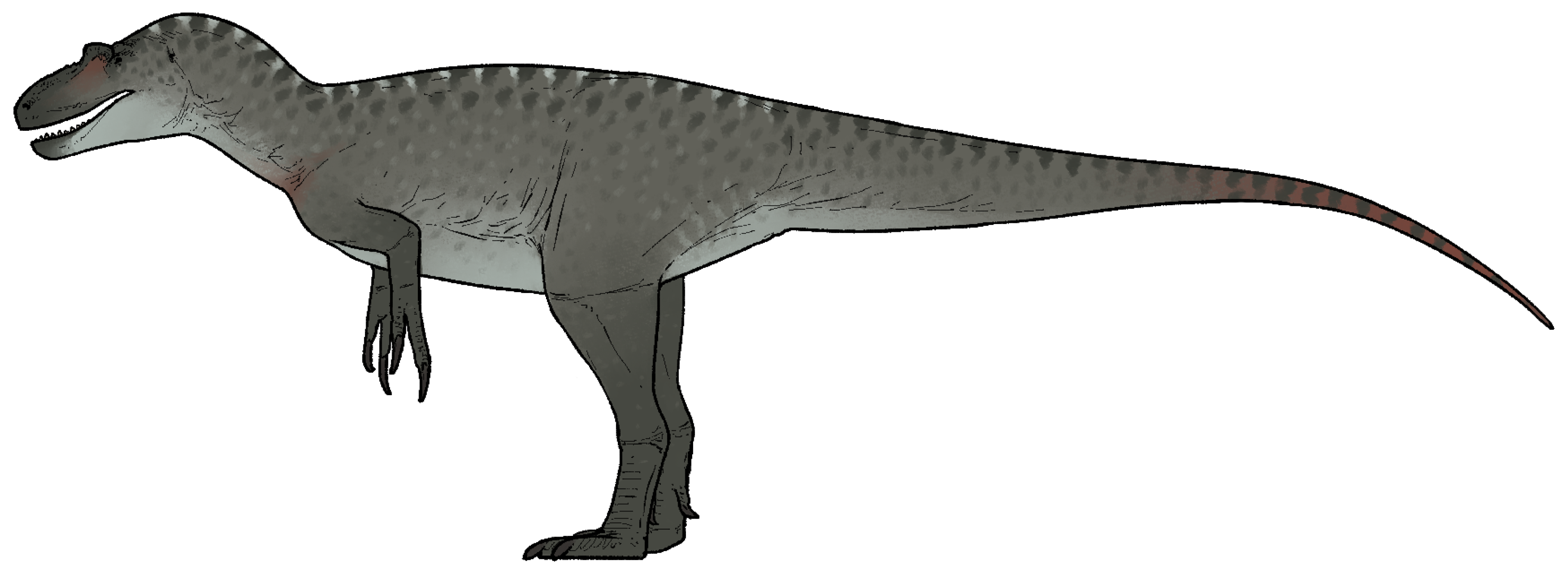
Hypothetical life restoration with scaly skin

According to Brusatte et al. (2011), Dryptosaurus can be distinguished based on the following characteristics: the combination of a reduced humerus (humerus: femur ratio = 0.375) and a large hand (phalanx I-1:femur ratio = 0.200), the strong mediolateral expansion of the ischial tubercle, which is approximately 1.7 times as wide as the shaft immediately distally, the presence of an ovoid fossa on the medial surface of the femoral shaft immediately proximal to the medial condyle (which is demarcated anteriorly by the mesiodistal crest and demarcated medially by a novel crest) the presence of a proximomedially trending ridge on the anterior surface of the fibula immediately proximal to the iliofibularis tubercle, the lip on the lateral surface of the lateral condyle of the astragalus being prominent and overlapping the proximal surface of the calcaneum, and metatarsal IV being observed with a flat shaft proximally (resulting in a semiovoid cross section that is much wider mediolaterally than it is long anteroposteriorly).

== Classification ==
=== Historic classification ===
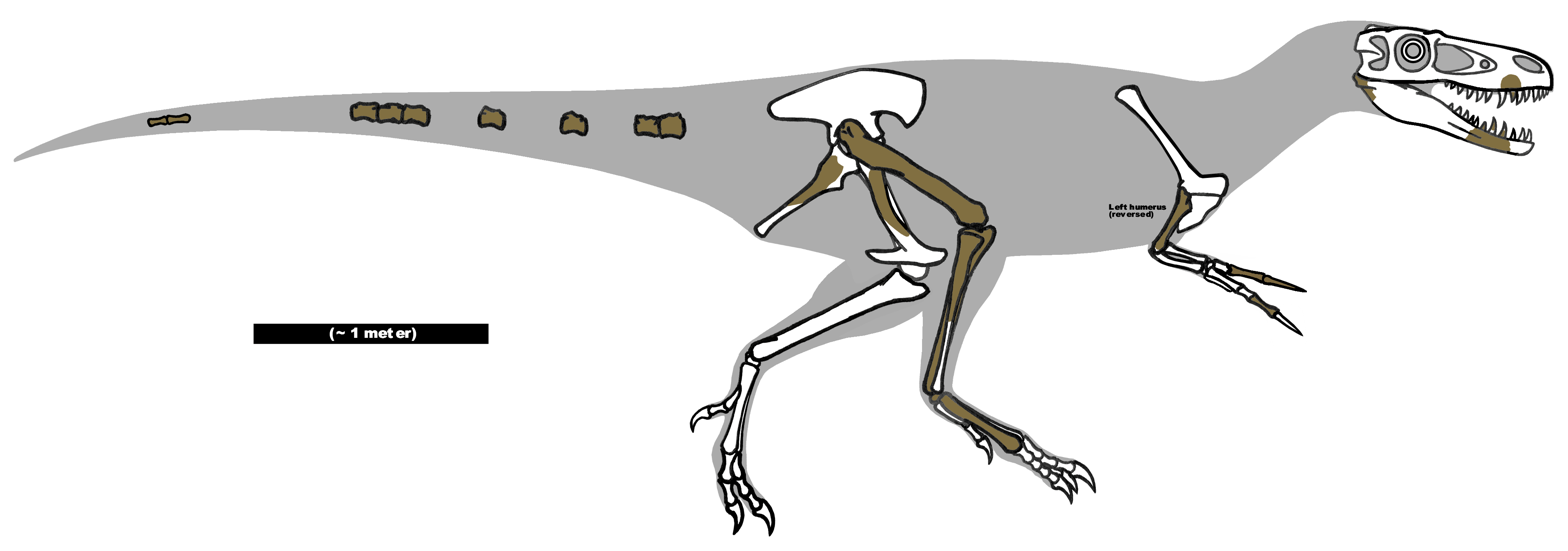
Diagram showing known remains of Dryptosaurus in brown

When initially described, Dryptosaurus' holotype was one of the most complete, associated skeletons of a large theropod dinosaur known to science. Prior to the discovery of Dryptosaurus, American theropods were largely represented by isolated teeth, whereas European forms were known from fragmentary skeletons. Due to this, Cope and other contemporary paleontologists had few taxa to compare Dryptosaurus to, leading them to note close similarities between Dryptosaurus and taxa like Megalosaurus that are now considered common amongst theropods. This led Dryptosaurus to often be classified as a megalosaurid or a deinodontid (an outdated family based on the dubious Deinodon), whereas Marsh (1890) dubbed a new family, Dryptosauridae, for some large theropod dinosaurs. Marsh defined this family by their small forelimbs with thin, prehensile claws, the proportions of the femora and tibiae, and more. Marsh (1896) included Dryptosaurus, Allosaurus, Coelosaurus, and Creosaurus as members of the family, however Coelosaurus is a nomen dubium and Creosaurus is a synonym of Allosaurus, which is now in its own family of carnosaurs, Allosauridae. He classified the other North American theropod Labrosaurus (a synonym of Allosaurus) in Labrosauridae, whereas all European large theropods were considered megalosaurids.

Between the 1890s and the 1990s, Dryptosaurus' classification remained uncertain. Henry Osborn (1902), Oliver Hay (1902), and Charles Gilmore (1920) placed the genus in Megalosauridae, while Matthew and Barnum Brown (1922) placed it in Deinodontidae based on its dental anatomy. However, Friedrich von Huene varied in his classification of the genus: in 1926, Huene put it in Megalosauridae as a descendant of Antrodemus (Allosaurus), while in 1932 he hypothesized that Dryptosaurus was a giant member of Coeluridae based on similarities with Elaphrosaurus, which is now considered a ceratosaur.

Beginning in the 1970s, some papers such as Baird and Horner (1979), White (1973), and Steel (1970) put it in Tyrannosauridae, while Russell (1970) argued it was unlikely that it and Laramidian tyrannosaurs were in the same family. In 1946, Charles W. Gilmore was the first to observe that certain anatomical features may link Dryptosaurus with coeval Late Cretaceous tyrannosaurids, Albertosaurus, and Tyrannosaurus. This observation was also supported by the work of Baird and Horner (1979), but did not have wide acceptance until a new discovery was made in 2005. Dryptosaurus was the only large named tyrannosaur known in eastern North America until the description of the basal tyrannosauroid Appalachiosaurus in 2005. Appalachiosaurus, which is known from more complete remains, is similar to Dryptosaurus in both body size and morphology. This discovery made it clear that Dryptosaurus was also a basal tyrannosauroid, an idea supported by a detailed phylogenetic analysis from Brusatte et al. (2013) which confirmed the tyrannosauroid affinities of Dryptosaurus and assigned it as an "intermediate" tyrannosauroid that is more derived than basal taxa, such as Guanlong and Dilong, but more primitive than members of the more derived Tyrannosauridae.

=== Modern classification ===
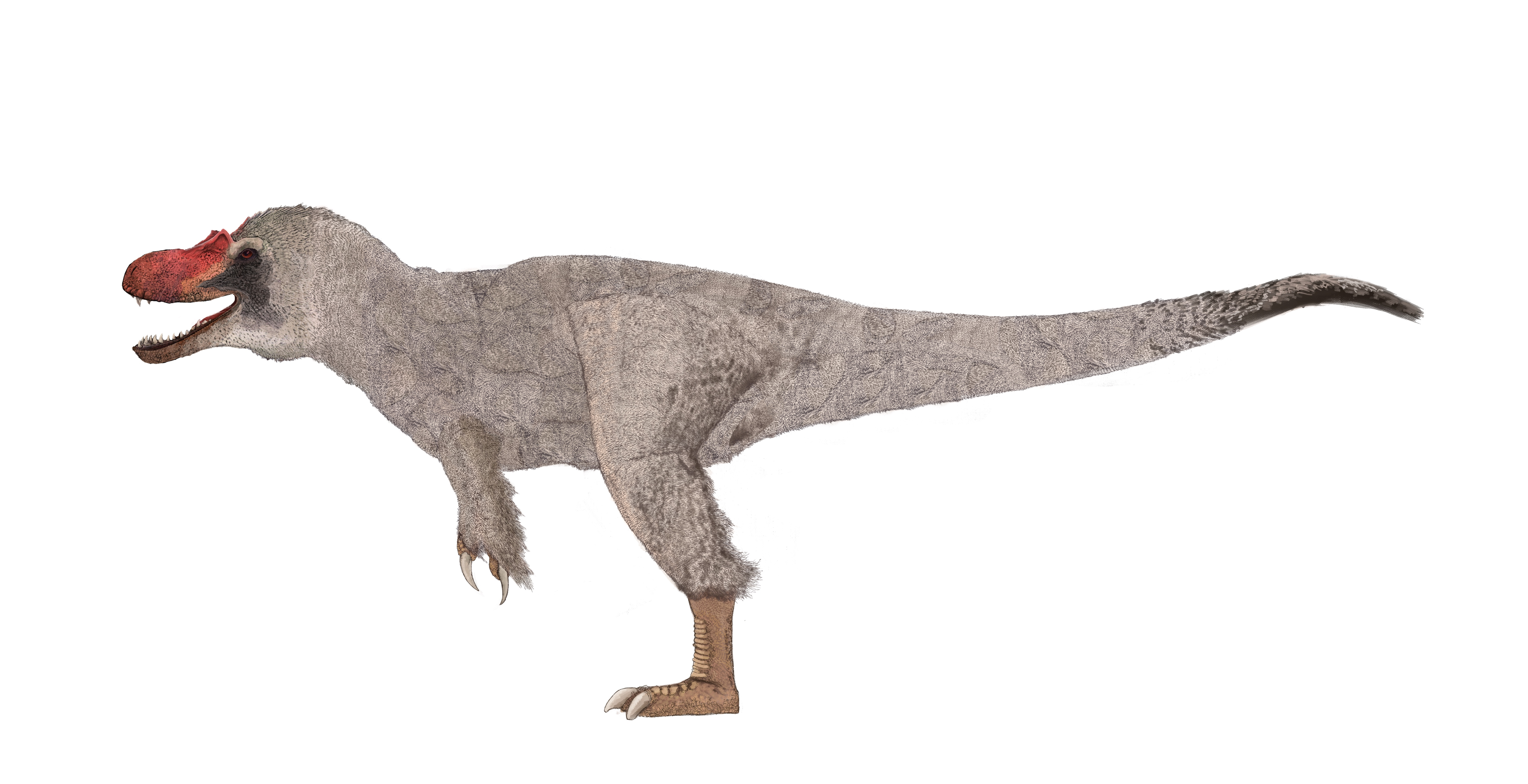
Hypothetical life restoration with simple feathers

Many phylogenetic analyses recover Dryptosaurus as a basal tyrannosauroid or a basal eutyrannosaur, often at a similar grade to Appalachiosaurus. Dryptosauridae remained unused and was considered synonymous with Tyrannosauroidea for decades until Brownstein (2021) revived its in his description of an unnamed and potentially distinct new tyrannosaur from the Santonian/Campanian-aged Merchantville Formation of Delaware. However, many subsequent papers have not included Dryptosauridae, instead recovering Dryptosaurus it as a basal eutyrannosaur. The fossils known of the Merchantville taxon consist of a metatarsus and a caudal vertebra, likely from the same individual. Dryptosaurus and the Merchantville taxon share several characteristics in their metatarsal anatomy such as a distally elongated articular surface for the metatarsal V on IV, the lack of a diaphysial bulge on the metatarsal III for articulation with II and IV, and more that are absent in any other eutyrannosaurs. Due to this, Brownstein argued that these are synapomorphies (traits present in a most recent common ancestor) of Dryptosauridae and that it is a valid clade, a case supported by the paper's phylogenetic which recovers a monophyletic Dryptosauridae in polytomy with Moros, Jinbeisaurus, Xiongguanlong, Timurlengia, and an unnamed tyrannosaur from the Iren Dabasu Formation at the base of Eutyrannosauria. Below is the cladogram from Brownstein (2021).

- Eutyrannosauria
  - - Timurlengia
    - Jinbeisaurus
    - Moros
    - Xiongguanlong
    - Iren Dabasu Taxon
    - Dryptosauridae
      - Dryptosaurus
      - Merchantville Taxon
    - - Appalachiosaurus
      - - Bistahieversor
        - - Tyrannosauridae
            - Albertosaurinae
              - Gorgosaurus
              - Albertosaurus
            - Tyrannosaurinae
              - Alioramini
                - Qianzhousaurus
                - Alioramus
              - - - Teratophoneus
                  - Nanuqsaurus
                  - Lythronax
                - - Nanuqsaurus hoglundi
                  - - - - Daspletosaurus torosus
                        - Daspletosaurus horneri
                      - - Zhuchengtyrannus magnus
                        - - Tarbosaurus bataar
                          - Tyrannosaurus rex

North America, during the Late Cretaceous period, was divided into two separate continents by the Western Interior Seaway: Laramidia in the west and Appalachia in the east. This Seaway stretched from north to south from what is now the Arctic Ocean to the Gulf of Mexico, leading to temporal speciation between the two landmasses. Laramidia features several dinosaur-producing fossil formations from the Late Cretaceous period, such as the Hell Creek and Ojo Alamo Formations, whereas Appalachia lacks many dinosaur fossils. A Bayesian inference phylogenetic analysis (named Topology B; appears on right below) from Zanno and Napoli (2025)'s paper on Nanotyrannus, placed Moros outside as a non-eutyrannosaurian as the sister to Timurlengia. Meanwhile, the Appalachian tyrannosauroids Appalachiosaurus and Dryptosaurus were found as the successive earliest-divering branches within the Nanotyrannidae.

Referencing this Topology B, Zanno and Napoli suggested that the most recent common ancestor (MRCA) between Nanotyrannidae and Tyrannosauridae may have lived roughly 103 million years ago, around the time of the formation of the Western Interior Seaway. The formation of the seaway may have resulted in their divergence, with tyrannosaurids inhabiting the western island continent of Laramidia, and nanotyrannids inhabiting the eastern island continent of Appalachia. The authors noted that further testing and more data would be required to support the results of one analysis over the other. However, their minimum parsimony analysis (Topology A; appears on left below) found Dryptosaurus to be a basal eutyranosaur outside of any family while Nanotyrannidae was made up of Nanotyrannus and Moros whereas Appalachiosaurus grouped with Alectrosaurus and Khankhuulu. The two cladograms from Zanno and Napoli (2025) are shown below:

Topology A: Maximum parsimony tree (K = 12)

- Tyrannosauroidea
  - Proceratosauridae
  - Pantyrannosauria
    - - Dilong paradoxus
      - Eotyrannus lengi
    - - Suskityrannus hazelae
      - - Xiongguanlong baimoensis
        - - Timurlengia euotica
          - - - Appalachiosaurus montgomeriensis
              - - Alectrosaurus olseni
                - Khankhuuluu mongoliensis
            - Eutyrannosauria
              - Dryptosaurus aquilunguis
              - - Nanotyrannidae
                  - Moros intrepidus
                  - Nanotyrannus lethaeus
                    (BMRP 2002.4.1)
                - - Nanotyrannus lancensis
              - Tyrannosauridae
                - Albertosaurinae
                  ⊞
                  - - Bistahieversor sealeyi
                    - UMNH VP 16690
                  - - Jinbeisaurus wangi
                    - - TCMI 2001.81.1
                      - - Teratophoneus curriei
                        - - UALVP 52981
                          - - Gorgosaurus sp. nov
                            - - Gorgosaurus libratus
                              - - Albertosaurus sarcophagus
                                - Albertosaurus sp. nov
                  ⊟
                - Tyrannosaurinae
                  - Alioramini
                    ⊞	Alioramus altai; Qianzhousaurus sinensis	⊟
                  - - Asiatyrannus xui
                    - - Thanatotheristes degrootorum
                      - - Daspletosaurus
                          ⊞
                          - Daspletosaurus wilsoni
                          - - Daspletosaurus horneri
                            - Daspletosaurus torosus
                          ⊟
                        - Tyrannosaurini
                          ⊞
                          - Lythronax argestes
                          - - Zhuchengtyrannus magnus
                            - - Tarbosaurus bataar
                              - - Tyrannosaurus mcraeensis
                                - Tyrannosaurus rex
                          ⊟

Topology B: BI-FBD tree

- Tyrannosauroidea
  - Proceratosauridae
  - Pantyrannosauria
    - - Dilong paradoxus
      - Eotyrannus lengi
    - - Xiongguanlong baimoensis
      - - - Suskityrannus hazelae
          - - Alectrosaurus olseni
            - Khankhuuluu mongoliensis
        - - - Moros intrepidus
            - Timurlengia euotica
          - Eutyrannosauria
            - Nanotyrannidae
              - Appalachiosaurus montgomeriensis
              - - Dryptosaurus aquilunguis
                - - Nanotyrannus lethaeus
                  - Nanotyrannus lancensis
            - Tyrannosauridae
              - Albertosaurinae
                ⊞
                - - Bistahieversor sealeyi
                  - Jinbeisaurus wangi
                - - UALVP 52981
                  - - - TCMI 2001.81.1
                      - Gorgosaurus sp. nov
                    - - Gorgosaurus libratus
                      - - Albertosaurus sarcophagus
                        - Albertosaurus sp. nov
                ⊟
              - Tyrannosaurinae
                - - Lythronax argestes
                  - - Teratophoneus curriei
                    - UMNH VP 16690
                - - Alioramini
                    ⊞
                    - Asiatyrannus xui
                    - - Alioramus altai
                      - Qianzhousaurus sinensis
                    ⊟
                  - - Thanatotheristes degrootorum
                    - - Daspletosaurus
                        ⊞
                        - Daspletosaurus horneri
                        - - Daspletosaurus torosus
                          - Daspletosaurus wilsoni
                        ⊟
                      - Tyrannosaurini
                        ⊞
                        - Zhuchengtyrannus magnus
                        - - Tarbosaurus bataar
                          - - Tyrannosaurus mcraeensis
                            - Tyrannosaurus rex
                        ⊟

== Paleoecology ==
The lithe build and elongated pes of Dryptosaurus and the Merchantville taxon are more similar to those of earlier tyrannosauroids like Moros and Suskityrannus, however the size of Dryptosaurus is in line with those of Laramidian tyrannosauroids. This led Brownstein (2021) to note that megapredatory tyrannosauroids in Appalachia evolved lightly built peses and skulls not adapted for osteophagy (bone eating) in contrast to the robust arctometatarsalian peses and robust, osteophagus jaws of Laramidian tyrannosauroids. Additionally, Dryptosaurus shows a menagerie of unique features like a lightly framed skull, ziphodont teeth, and a large raptorial, manus that forms a unique body plan among tyrannosauroids. Despite this, Dryptosaurus and the Merchantville taxon occupied the same megapredatory niche as tyrannosaurids, a role previously filled in Appalachia by large allosauroids. In the Atlantic Coast Plain, Dryptosaurus and the Merchantville taxon likely preyed on hadrosaurids, ornithomimosaurs, and ankylosaurs, which are all represented by fragmentary remains. Cope theorized that Dryptosaurus predated upon Hadrosaurus as Megalosaurus preyed on Iguanodon in the Wealden and Oolite Groups of England and Aublysodon preyed on Trachodon in the "Nebraska Beds". However, Dryptosaurus and Hadrosaurus come from different fossil formations.

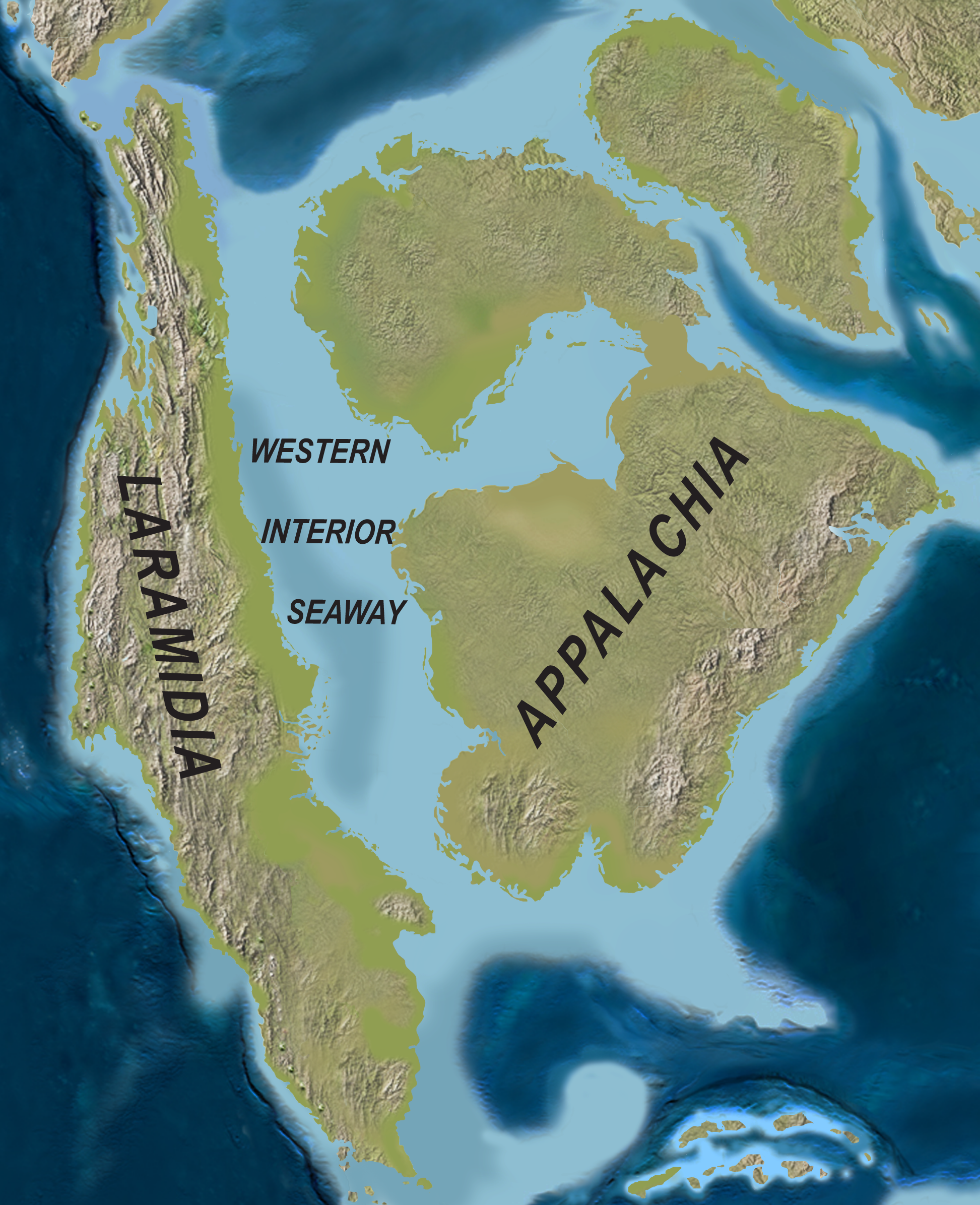
Map of North America during the Upper Cretaceous

The New Egypt Formation where Dryptosaurus fossils are known was underwater during the Late Cretaceous period. The Dryptosaurus holotype was an individual that floated out to sea, sunk to the sea floor, and became fossilized. This area is thought to have been a deeper-water area of the Tinton and Red Bank Formations. Strata of the New Egypt Formation is composed of massive clayey, glauconitic marl that was later used in fertilizers. Mining of the glauconitic marls in the West Jersey Marl Company Pit for fertilizers led to the discovery of fossils like those of Dryptosaurus. The New Egypt Formation is part of the Monmouth Group and overlies the Navesink Formation, from which possible Dryptosaurus fossils have been reported.

Dryptosaurus lived along two other dinosaurs in the New Egypt Formation, the dubious hadrosaurid Hadrosaurus minor and a potential lambeosaurine. Being a marine deposit, most of the fossils found in the formation come from aquatic life. Marine reptiles are represented by crocodylomorphs like Hyposaurus, turtles like Agomphus, Euclastes, and Pneumatoarthrus, and the mosasaurids Mosasaurus, Prognathodon, and an indeterminate russellosaurine. Chondricthian fish from the New Egypt Formation include the chimaera Edaphodon, the sharks, Cretalamna, Ginglymostoma, and Squalicorax, the rays Dasyatis and Rhombodus, the sawskates Sclerorhynchus, Ischyrhiza, and Ptychotrygon, and the guitarfish Rhinobatos. As for bony fish, the pycnodont Anomoeodus has been reported from the formation. Some invertebrates are also known from the site, such as the bivalve Cucullaea and the cephalopod Baculites.

== Museum reconstruction ==
A recreated Dryptosaurus is among the featured exhibits of the Edelman Fossil Park & Museum of Rowan University, which opened on March 29, 2025. The museum stands about a mile from where Dryptosaurus was found in 1866, and describes it as the first discovered tyrannosaur.

== Leaping Laelaps ==
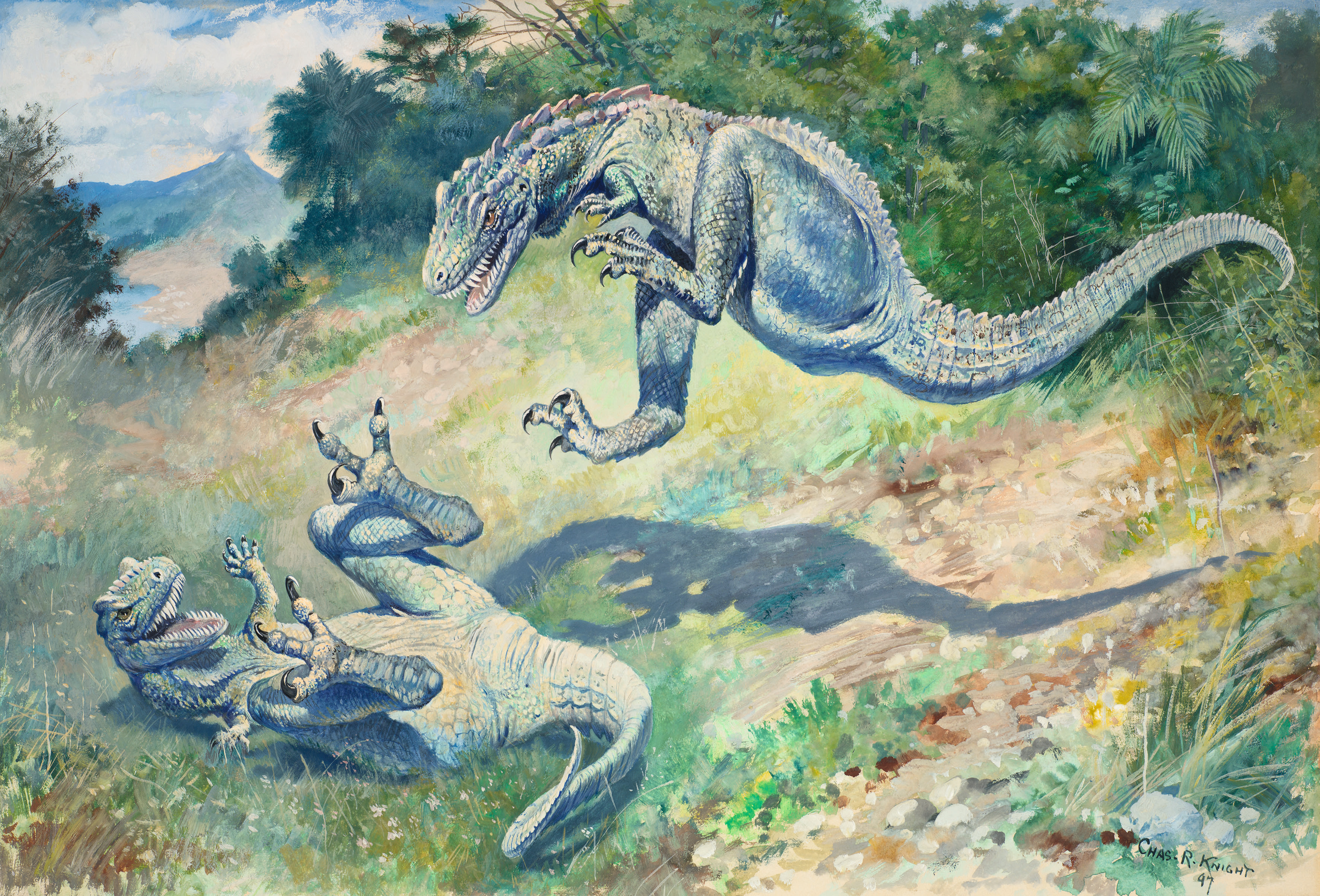
Leaping Laelaps by Charles R. Knight, 1897

The 1897 watercolor painting by Charles R. Knight titled Leaping Laelaps may represent the earliest depiction of theropods as highly active and dynamic animals. Knight's restoration was guided by Edward Drinker Cope and Henry Fairfield Osborn, who believed that Laelaps (Dryptosaurus) was an agile animal. The original painting is now preserved in the AMNH collections. This active and lively depiction of dinosaurs was later echoed by the Dinosaur Renaissance in the 1970s. By contrast, most 19th-century illustrations of large carnivorous dinosaurs like Megalosaurus presented dinosaurs as large, slow, and tail-dragging.

== See also ==
- Timeline of tyrannosaur research
