= ORBI =

ORBI or Orbi may refer to:

- Baghdad International Airport
- Orbi, a wildlife theme park in Yokohama, Japan
- Alex Orbison (born 1975), American drummer, writer, director, and film producer
- a repository of the University of Liège; see Open access in Belgium § Repositories
- a mesh Wi-Fi system produced by Netgear

== See also ==
- Urbi et Orbi
