= Marco Marenghi =

Welsh film animator

Marco Marenghi is a Welsh film animator/director who was born in Rhondda in Wales. He graduated from the University of Wales with an HNC in Electronics, and he worked for a microelectronics firm in Rhondda. He was laid off due to redundancy, and he briefly worked as a TV repairman before becoming unemployed. His wife encouraged him to take an animation course at the University of Glamorgan. After graduating with an HND in Animation, he worked for Framestore for four years on projects including the James Bond film Tomorrow Never Dies (1997) and the BBC television miniseries Walking with Dinosaurs (1999). DreamWorks hired Marenghi to work on films including Minority Report (2002). He moved to Sony Pictures Imageworks, where he worked as animation supervisor on films including I Am Legend (2007) and Ghost Rider (2007). He also worked as an animation director for Animal Logic for the film Walking with Dinosaurs (2013). The BBC featured Marenghi's dramatic career change and inspirational story in the documentary On Show: The Marco Marenghi Story (2004).

In 2008 Marenghi received the Friz Frieling lifetime Achievement Award in Animation and in 2009 he was awarded an Honorary Doctorate in Technology from the University of South Wales.

Marenghi lives in Los Angeles, California with his wife and two children.

== Filmography ==
- Ghost Rider (2007) – animation supervisor
- I Am Legend (2007) – animation supervisor
- Speed Racer (2008) – animation supervisor
- Valkyrie (2008) – character animator
- 2012 (2009) – animator
- Alice in Wonderland (2010) – supervising animator
- Green Lantern (2011) – supervising animator
- Walking with Dinosaurs (2013) – animation director
