= Walking with Dinosaurs (film) =

2013 family film

- Theatrical release poster
- Directed by: Neil Nightingale; Barry Cook
- Written by: John Collee
- Based on: Walking with Dinosaurs
- Produced by: Mike Devlin; Luke Hetherington; Amanda Hill; Deepak Nayar
- Starring: John Leguizamo; Justin Long; Tiya Sircar; Skyler Stone; Charlie Rowe; Angourie Rice; Karl Urban
- Cinematography: John Brooks
- Edited by: John Carnochan; Jeremiah O'Driscoll
- Music by: Paul Leonard-Morgan
- Production companies: Reliance Entertainment; IM Global; BBC Earth Films; Evergreen Studios
- Distributed by: 20th Century Fox (Select territories); Reliance Entertainment (India)
- Release dates: 14 December 2013 (Dubai Int'l Film Festival); 20 December 2013 (United States)
- Running time: 87 minutes
- Countries: United Kingdom; United States; Australia; India
- Language: English
- Budget: $80 million
- Box office: $126.5 million

Walking with Dinosaurs is a 2013 adventure film about dinosaurs set in the Late Cretaceous period, 70 million years ago. The production features computer-animated dinosaurs in live-action settings with actors John Leguizamo, Justin Long, Tiya Sircar, and Skyler Stone providing voice-overs for the main characters. It was directed by Neil Nightingale and Barry Cook from a screenplay by John Collee. In the film, an underdog dinosaur named Patchi must find his courage to become the leader of his herd as well as become a hero for the ages.

The film was produced by BBC Earth and Evergreen Films and is loosely based on the BBC's 1999 television documentary miniseries of the same name. The film, with a budget of US$80 million, was one of the largest independent productions at the time. It was financed by Reliance Big Entertainment and IM Global instead of a major studio. The majority of distribution rights were eventually sold to 20th Century Fox. The crew filmed footage on location in the U.S. state of Alaska and in New Zealand, which were chosen for their similarities to the dinosaurs' surroundings millions of years ago. Animal Logic designed computer-animated dinosaurs and added them to the live-action backdrop. Though the film was originally going to lack narration or dialogue, 20th Century Fox executives decided to add voiceovers, believing it would connect audiences to the characters.

Walking with Dinosaurs premiered on 14 December 2013 at the Dubai International Film Festival. It was released in cinemas in 2D and 3D on 20 December 2013. Critics commended the film's visual effects, but derided its subpar storyline and the juvenile quality of the voiceover performances. The film grossed US$36 million in the United States and Canada and US$87.2 in other territories for a worldwide total of US$126.5 million. The Hollywood Reporter stated the film's global box office performance was disappointing in context of the production budget and marketing costs.

== Plot ==
A paleontologist named Zack takes his nephew Ricky and his niece Jade on a fossil hunt in Alaska while their parents are on vacation in Europe. While alone, Ricky encounters an anthropomorphic raven named Alex, who then transforms into a prehistoric ancestor, Alexornis. Alex tells Ricky of a story set in the Late Cretaceous period, 70 million years ago, about his best friend Patchi.

Patchi is the youngest and smallest in a litter of Pachyrhinosaurus hatchlings and is often bullied by his older brother Scowler. Their father Bulldust is the leader of the herd. Alex, who is Patchi's mentor, protector, and teacher, tries to help Patchi impress a female Pachyrhinosaurus named Juniper, but her herd migrates south without him. Patchi is also attacked by a Troodon, which attempts to eat him, but he is saved by his dad, resulting in Patchi having a hole in his frill as an injury which Alex claims that Patchi is "destined for greatness".

Later, Bulldust moves his herd south as well, but when they try to pass through a forest, they are forced to flee when a storm strikes and a forest fire erupts. Taking advantage of the chaos, a pack of Gorgosaurus attacks the scattered herd. They kill the rest of Patchi and Scowler's family, while their leader and alpha, Gorgon, fights and kills Bulldust while he's trying to defend Patchi and Scowler. Afterwards, Patchi's herd, now led by Bulldust's rival Major, combine with Juniper's herd as they continue their migration. Gorgon's pack attacks them again, and in the ensuing chaos, Patchi, Scowler, and Juniper fall into a river and are swept downstream to the ocean, with Alex following them from above. At a beach, Scowler follows a herd of Edmontosaurus to find food, callously leaving Patchi and Juniper behind. The two make their way through a forest and eventually are able to find their herd and Scowler.

After years of making the same migration from north to south and vice versa, a grown up Scowler becomes the herd's new leader after defeating Major and chooses Juniper to be his mate, much to Patchi's disappointment. Scowler recklessly leads the herd onto a frozen lake, but Patchi is able to lead the majority of the herd to safety. Enraged and mistakenly believing that Patchi is going to usurp him and try to take Juniper from him, Scowler confronts his brother and challenges him for a battle in exchange for leadership of the herd. Scowler, as he is much stronger and larger than Patchi, quickly gains the upper hand and defeats his brother by trapping him under a tree before coldly disowning him and ordering Juniper, along with the rest of the herd, to leave Patchi behind. Despondent and heartbroken, Patchi, now trapped underneath the tree and unable to do anything, attempts to accept his fate by allowing scavengers to kill and eat him, but Alex convinces him to die for something worth dying for, just as his father Bulldust did.

Reinvigorated by the advice, Patchi escapes and fights off the scavengers, before catching up to the herd, only to find them confronted by Gorgon and his pack once more. As Gorgon easily overpowers and injures him in battle, finally realizing what has done and the way he has treated whom, a repentant Scowler orders Patchi to save himself and lead the herd to safety. However, Patchi leads them into fighting Gorgon and his pack to save Scowler instead. The herd successfully drive off the Gorgosaurus pack, while Patchi defeats Gorgon by breaking his right arm that had gotten caught in the hole of Patchi's frill, before knocking out some of Gorgon's teeth with a powerful headbutt, saving Scowler's life and avenging Bulldust's death.

The two brothers reconcile before Scowler concedes leadership of the herd to Patchi, who goes on to have Juniper as his mate, Patchi become as an father, Juniper become as an mother and has a family with her, with his brother. A baby Pachyrhinosaurus named Alex Jr. Scowler becomes as an uncle. In the present day, moved by Alex's story, Ricky returns Gorgon's now fossilized tooth to Zack and Jade, who had discovered Gorgon's skeleton buried in the ground nearby.

== Cast ==
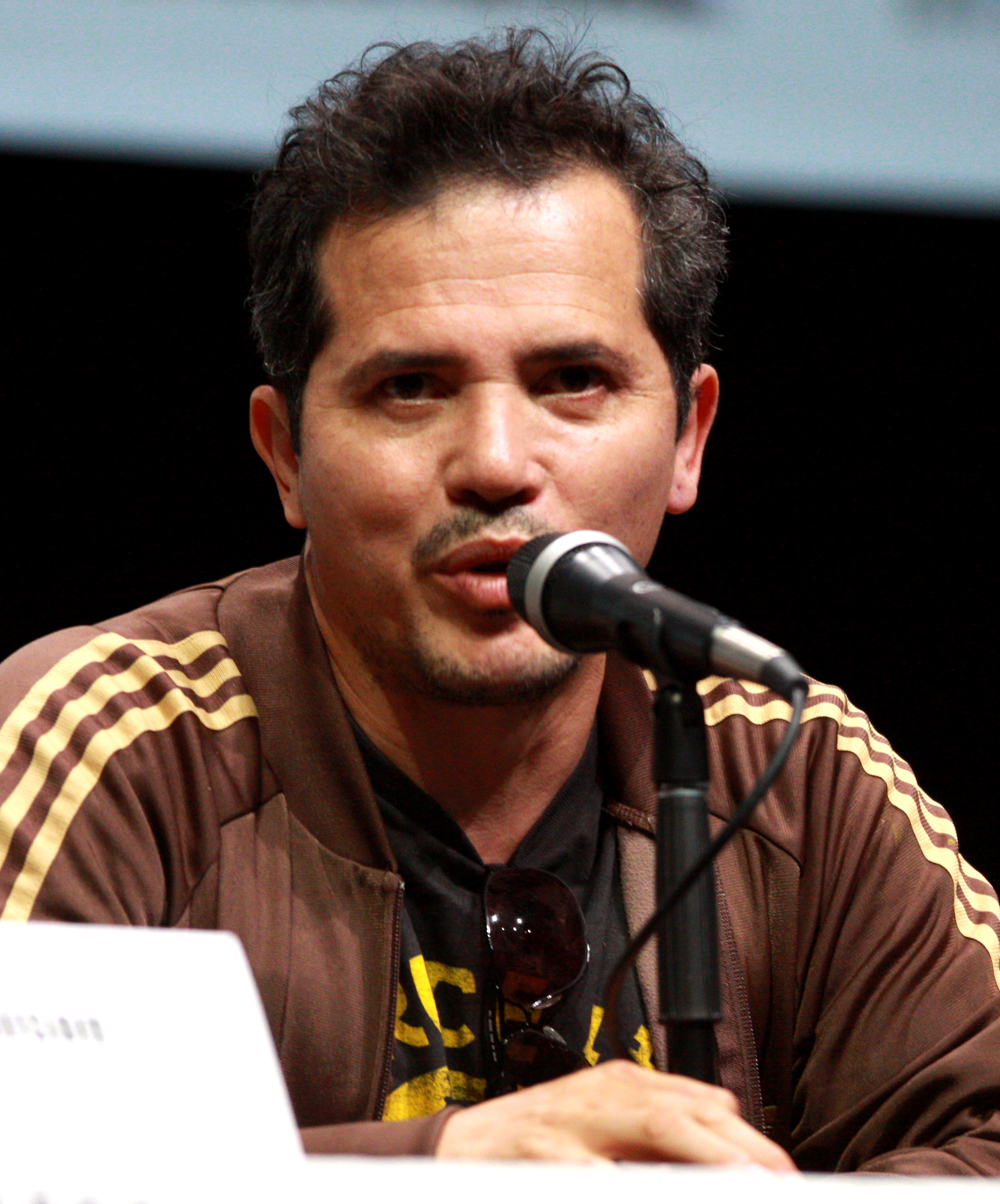
Actor John Leguizamo voiced Alex the Alexornis, who also narrates the film.

Voiceovers for prehistoric creatures

- John Leguizamo as Alex; an alexornis and Patchi's best friend.
- Justin Long as Patchi, a leader of the Pachyrhinosaurus; Scowler's youngest brother and Alex Jr's father.
- Tiya Sircar as Juniper; Patchi's love interest and Alex Jr's mother.
- Skyler Stone as Scowler; a new leader the Pachyrhinosaurus, Patchi's older brother and Alex Jr's uncle.

Modern-day humans

- Karl Urban as Uncle Zack
- Charlie Rowe as Ricky
- Angourie Rice as Jade

In the film, the story of the dinosaurs is book-ended by live-action footage. Long, Leguizamo, Sircar, and Stone provide voiceovers for the computer-animated dinosaurs, while the book-end scenes star Urban as an uncle taking his nephew and niece, played by Rowe and Rice, to a dinosaur excavation site. For the role of Alex, Leguizamo said he sought to conceal his own accent and create a unique voice for Alex. He adopted a Spanish accent since parrots had a Latin American origin. He said, "What was most difficult was finding the right pitch, because Alex is a small bird, but he's also the story's narrator. So he also had to sound paternal and patriarchal." Leguizamo compared his accent to that of Ricardo Montalbán, a Mexican actor. Long said he was cast based on his voicing of the chipmunk Alvin in Alvin and the Chipmunks (2007) and its sequels.

== Creatures in film ==
- Alexornis
- Alphadon
- Avitelmessus
- Chirostenotes
- Edmontonia
- Edmontosaurus
- Gorgosaurus
- Hesperonychus
- Pachyrhinosaurus
- Parksosaurus
- Quetzalcoatlus
- Troodon

== Production ==
Walking with Dinosaurs, named after BBC's 1999 television documentary miniseries, was produced by BBC Earth, an arm of BBC Worldwide, launched in 2009. The feature film is directed by Barry Cook, who was a director for Mulan (1998) and the co-director for Arthur Christmas (2011), and by Neil Nightingale, creative director at BBC Earth. The script was written by John Collee. Nightingale and BBC Earth's managing director, Amanda Hill, sought to produce film adaptations to extend the arm's brand of nature programming. The two were inspired by returns for Deep Blue (2003) and Earth (2007), which were theatrical versions cut from their respective nature documentary series. In June 2010, BBC Earth entered a deal with Evergreen Films, based in the United States, to produce a film featuring dinosaurs. By the following November, BBC Earth entered a deal with Reliance Big Entertainment to finance the production of three films, including Walking with Dinosaurs. The deal had initially attached Pierre de Lespinois of Evergreen Films and Neil Nightingale to co-direct the film. Barry Cook, who joined the film in March 2010, eventually replaced de Lespinois as director.

The total production budget was $80 million. About 70% of the budget was covered when IM Global, a finance and sales company backed by Reliance, sold the film rights to various distributors at the American Film Market in November 2010. The budget was further covered by tax breaks provided for filming in Alaska and New Zealand. IM Global covered only 15% of the budget directly. Forbes called Walking with Dinosaurs an independent film with an unconventionally large budget since the production did not originate at a major studio. Nightingale explained, "It was originally funded by... Reliance, and then we sold it pretty quickly to 20th Century Fox for most of the world, and to a range of other distributors in a few other countries, and that's not an unusual path for an independent film – in other words, a non-studio film which doesn't originate from a big studio."

=== Filming ===
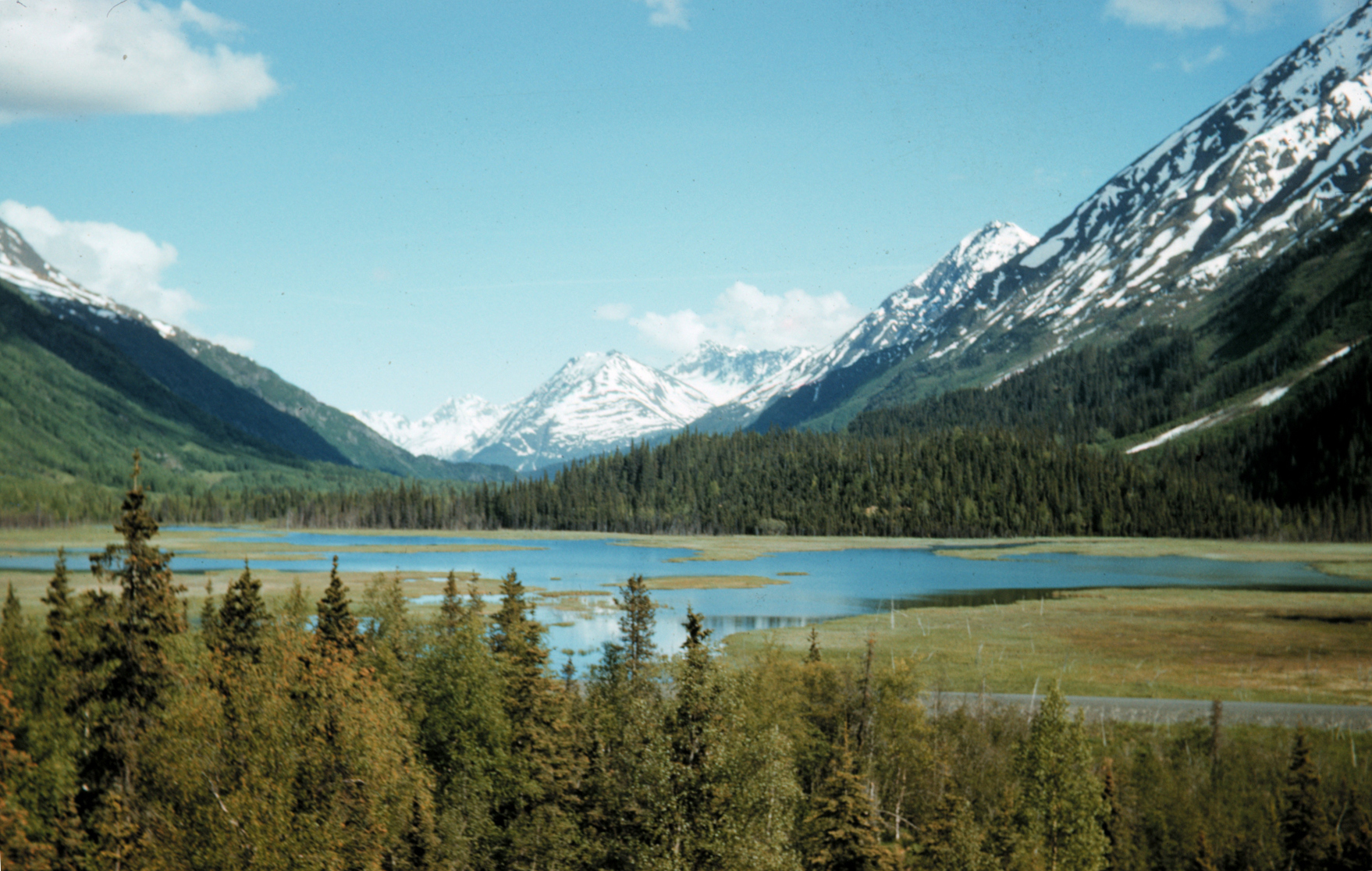
The directors filmed footage at the Kenai Peninsula of Alaska to serve as a live-action backdrop for the computer-animated dinosaurs

The film features computer-animated creatures in live-action settings. Live-action footage was filmed in New Zealand and in the southern part of the U.S. state of Alaska. Director Nightingale said, "[They] have that kind of temperate climate which represents the period very well. The world was a bit warmer then, so they would have had 24 hours of sunshine in the summer and 24 hours of darkness in the winter." Filming began in 2011 in Alaska, where Evergreen Films is headquartered. In the second half of 2011, more than 55 people were working out of Evergreen's office in the Alaskan city of Anchorage. While the film's dinosaurs lived in Alaska during the Late Cretaceous period approximately 70 million years ago, they lived more in the northern part of the state due to the climate at the time. Filmmakers considered Southeast Alaska's rainforests below the Arctic Circle close to the climate that the dinosaurs experienced, so they filmed there and in Southcentral Alaska. Specific locations included Crow Creek Mine near Girdwood and the Kenai Peninsula. In 2012, the state government of Alaska awarded the production companies a subsidy of US$1.7 million. Additional filming also took place on South Island of New Zealand. For a river chase scene, filming was performed at rapids in New Zealand using a helicopter and with a 3D camera rig in a rubber boat. At the locations, the crew built dinosaur shapes out of PVC drain pipes to give the filmmakers a sense of the dinosaurs' scale when filming the live-action backdrop.

=== Animation ===
Animation work was done by the Australia-based company Animal Logic, which joined the production in January 2011. Its involvement with the production created 140 jobs in New South Wales. The company's animation director for Walking with Dinosaurs was Marco Marenghi, who had also worked on the BBC miniseries. The company collaborated with animation producer Jinko Gotoh, who contributed to Finding Nemo (2003) and 9 (2009).

Character designer David Krentz, who also worked on Disney Animation's Dinosaur (2000), designed about 20 creatures for the film and worked with 5-6 palaeontologists. The characters were based on creatures found at fossil sites in Alaska and Canada. Krentz initially designed the creatures in pencil then modeled them with the software ZBrush to send to animators. In addition, palaeontologists provided Animal Logic with technical drawings of dinosaur skeletons so animators could construct the skeletons virtually. The animators collaborated with the palaeontologists to validate the basic movements of the computer-animated dinosaurs. Software was used to overlay muscle to fit the movements. Animal Logic adapted the software Quill, which they used to animate penguin feathers in their work on Happy Feet (2006), into new software called RepTile to animate dinosaur skin and scales. It also added feathers for some dinosaurs, including the Troodon and the Hesperonychus. The color palette and feather pattern of a golden pheasant was used for the appearance of Hesperonychus. The natural history unit archives were used to create a "behaviour matrix" that matched the dinosaurs' anatomically correct gestures to their moods. Animal Logic ultimately created 800 animated shots for the film, which director Cook said was a low number for an animated film.

The 3D effects for the animation were achieved with the Fusion 3D system, which was used for Avatar (2009), Transformers: Dark of the Moon (2011), and live 3D sports broadcasts. Cinematographer John Brooks worked with consultants and stereographers from the Cameron Pace Group to use a two-camera setup and capture film in 3D.

=== Music ===
Paul Leonard-Morgan composed the film score for Walking with Dinosaurs, joining the production in July 2013. The soundtrack was released through Sony Classical Records and Metropolis Movie Music on 24 December 2013.

=== Voiceovers ===
In the film, actors provide voiceovers for the main creatures. Director Barry Cook said the original plan was for the film to be without dialogue or narration. He said, "I think originally, we were looking at a film that could stand alone as a virtual silent movie... You can turn the soundtrack off and still get involved with the story and feel the emotions of the characters. In its final version, the movie has a narration and goes inside the heads of the animals, so you can hear what they're thinking." Executives at 20th Century Fox, one of the film's main distributors, viewed a rough cut and felt the film needed voiceovers so children in the audience could connect to the characters.

The film's character designer David Krentz said, "Although the production veered away from being very realistic, the animation still plays independently. The powers that be decided to add narration and voice-over to reach a wider audience and the characters became slightly anthropomorphized to make them more attractive to younger kids." Palaeontologist Steve Brusatte responded to The Scotsman's prompt about the "danger of anthropomorphising" the dinosaurs, "The voiceovers are a bit of a compromise; the dinosaurs' lips aren't moving, they are not smiling and having human-like facial expressions or anything like that... They are only anthropomorphised to a small degree and that is necessary for a film like this."

== Palaeontological accuracy ==
Variety reported, "[Director] Nightingale describes the project as 'mainstream entertainment' rather than natural history... but draws accurately on the latest discoveries in paleontology." A team of scientific and technical consultants contributed to the film. One team member was Dr. Steve Brusatte of the University of Edinburgh, who is a Chancellor's Fellow in Vertebrate Palaeontology. Brusatte said the filmmakers strove to understand the discoveries about dinosaurs since the release of Jurassic Park in 1993, "They used so much of this information that we've learned over the past few decades, about feathered dinosaurs, about how dinosaurs lived in big herds, which dinosaurs preyed on each other, their environments, and used that to tell the story."

The Gorgosaurus is one of the film's main dinosaurs and is depicted with iridescent scales. Its appearance was scrutinized for palaeontological accuracy due to findings of preserved feathers in other tyrannosaurs.

Some dinosaurs in the film are feathered. Brusatte said, "Over the past 15 years, we have collected thousands of specimens of feathered dinosaurs – proper bona fide dinosaurs covered in feathers." New Scientist reported that "no evidence has yet been found" to suggest that Pachyrhinosaurus or Gorgosaurus were feathered. Director Cook said of the Gorgosaurus, "We decided that we wouldn't put feathers on that one, but we did give that dinosaur iridescent scales." National Geographic said, "Many paleontologists and dinosaur fans are disappointed that CGI docudrama's villains, a gaggle of iridescent Gorgosaurus, are devoid of any fluff or fuzz." Shortly after the filmmakers designed their Gorgosaurus for the film, the tyrannosauroid Yutyrannus was discovered with direct evidence of feathers. While much older than Gorgosaurus, Yutyrannus provides further evidence of feathers in tyrannosauroids. National Geographic also noted that Gorgosaurus was depicted as feathered in the 2011 direct-to-video film March of the Dinosaurs.

Palaeontologist Anthony Fiorillo was a consultant for the film and helped determine what dinosaurs lived in Alaska at the time. Fiorillo said "the first known track" of a therizinosaur in Alaska was discovered in 2012, which was too late to include in the film's lineup of dinosaurs. The palaeontologist said based on ongoing research of Pachyrhinosaurus perotorum, which he discovered in Alaska in 2012, he would have modified his advice to the filmmakers about designing the film's Pachyrhinosaurus.

Don Lessem, a writer who specializes in dinosaurs, said Walking with Dinosaurs was an improvement from Jurassic Park in how the dinosaurs fit the period. He found most of the dinosaurs to be depicted correctly but also highlighted the possibility of Gorgosaurus having feathers. Lessem stated the Alaskan scenery, while "a spectacular backdrop", did not exist at the time, "Conifers excepted, such scenery did not exist in dinosaur-age Alaska. Think woody outskirts of Seattle instead. Rainy and cool. No grand Rockies. Or much grass. And not much snow or ice."

== Marketing ==
20th Century Fox marketed Walking with Dinosaurs in the territories where it distributed the film. It also held a launch event at the Natural History Museum of Los Angeles County in California. The film is an extension of an existing franchise that started with the BBC miniseries and continued with an arena show that put animatronic dinosaurs on display. Since merchandising deals already existed, filmmakers easily began releasing merchandise for the film. Forbes said, "There is already merchandise (toys, lunch boxes etc.) related to the movie which is normally unheard of for a first film." Macmillan Children's Books (under Macmillan Publishers) acquired the license to publish tie-in books for the film in the United Kingdom and the Commonwealth. They published, in November 2013, an encyclopaedic guide to the film's dinosaurs, a film handbook, and sticker books. Travelgoods.com produced back to school merchandise based on the film, and Keldan International sold a hatching-egg toy for Christmas.

Supermassive Games developed the Wonderbook game Walking with Dinosaurs for the PlayStation 3. The game was released on 13 November 2013.

== Release ==
=== Distribution sales ===
While Reliance Entertainment released the film in India, IM Global, which represented non-India rights to distribute the film, marketed it at the American Film Market in November 2010. In what Variety called one of the "biggest deals in years", 20th Century Fox, the one-time U.S. home video distributor of the original series, purchased rights to distribute the film in the United States, the United Kingdom, France, Australia, Japan, South Korea, Latin America, and other territories. Variety reported, "Insiders say it's safe to say that the pre-sales cover most, if not all, of the film's budget." For other territories, Constantin Film purchased distribution rights for Germany, Alliance Films for Canada, Aurum for Spain, and Dutch FilmWorks for Belgium, the Netherlands and Luxembourg. Entertainment One acquired Alliance and Aurum in January 2013, which rearranged distribution rights.

=== Theatrical run ===
Walking with Dinosaurs premiered on 14 December 2013 at the Dubai International Film Festival. Distributor 20th Century Fox also had a special screening for the film in New York City on 15 December 2013. It distributed the film in cinemas in the United States and in the United Kingdom on 20 December 2013. It distributed the film in Australia and New Zealand on 1 January 2014.

Distributor 20th Century Fox focused advertising on young children. It also advertised the film as one for kids like Avatar (2009) was for adults. Prior to the film's release, Forbes stated that in the United States, Walking with Dinosaurs was the only "kid-friendly film" coming out in December 2013. The Wall Street Journal said, "Walking with Dinosaurs... is the only new release targeted at children and is expected to appeal primarily to young ones." Box Office Mojo commented in its December 2013 forecast, "It should do some solid business among families with younger children, though in a highly-competitive season this is the kind of movie that can get lost in the pack." It predicted that Walking with Dinosaurs would gross US$11.8 million over the weekend and rank sixth at the box office. ComingSoon.net predicted that with a crowded weekend of films, Walking with Dinosaurs would gross US$6.8 million over the weekend to rank seventh at the box office. TheWrap says that box office analysts predict a weekend opening "in the low-teen millions".

The film was released in 3,231 cinemas in the United States with 84% of the cinemas having 3D. On the opening weekend in the United States, it grossed US$7.1 million and ranked eighth at the box office. According to the polling firm CinemaScore, audiences gave the film a "B" grade. Distributor 20th Century Fox had anticipated an opening weekend of US$10 million to US$12 million. The Hollywood Reporter said, "Walking with Dinosaurs is the first major disappointment of the Christmas season." It was outperformed almost 3-to-1 by the competing family film Frozen, which ranked third at the box office and had been in theaters for a month. Outside the United States, Walking with Dinosaurs was released in 40 markets the same opening weekend. It grossed US$13.8 million, with US$1.6 million grossed in the United Kingdom.

Walking with Dinosaurs has grossed US$36.1 million in the United States and Canada and US$94.5 million in other territories for a worldwide total of US$130.6 million. In the United States, it is one of only twelve feature films to be released in over 3,000 theaters and still improve on its box office performance in its second weekend, increasing 2.6% from $7,091,938 to $7,276,172. The Hollywood Reporter said in January 2014 that the film's global box office performance was disappointing and was likely to only go up to US$125 million, meaning "a potential loss in the tens of millions for the financiers". It reported the financiers' response about the anticipated loss, "They contend they will break even because of sponsorships, merchandising, tax breaks and foreign presales in territories where Fox didn't pick up the film." Fox would also avoid a loss since it did not cover any part of the production budget and would get a distribution fee.

=== Critical reception ===
The Wall Street Journal reported that film critics thought that Walking with Dinosaurs's "majestic visuals are seriously undermined by pedestrian storytelling". The Hollywood Reporter said, "Many critics have derided the juvenile tone of the voice dialogue... also noting that the animals' lips don't move." The film review aggregator website Metacritic gave an aggregate score of 37 out of 100, which it said indicated "generally unfavorable" reviews. It surveyed 21 critics and assessed 10 reviews as negative, six as mixed, and five as positive. The similar website Rotten Tomatoes scored the film with 23% based on a survey of 77 reviews assessed as positive or negative, with an average score of 4.4/10. The website said, "Walking with Dinosaurs boasts painstaking visual brilliance, but it's unfortunately clouded by a clumsy script that's dominated by juvenile humor." It also reported, "The pundits say the filmmakers seem to have worried that a quasi-nature documentary approach might have turned off the youngsters, but the narrative is so poorly executed that the end result isn't all that entertaining, much less educational."

Mark Adams of Screen International said Walking with Dinosaurs worked as "a kids' film for young dino fans". Adams commended the 3D special effects as "immersive and impressive" but thought audiences may be frustrated at "its rather simplistic story". He said, "The film's attempt to make its story broad and accessible at times sits uneasily alongside the spectacular computer animation." Michael Rechtshaffen, reviewing for The Hollywood Reporter, also approved of the effects, calling them "first rate". The critic however complained that the added dialogue was "needless" and that it was "safe to assume that the overlay was added after the fact" by studio executives. Rechtshaffen said, "Although the plotting... follows a safely predictable course... It's that forced, unnecessary and largely unfunny dialogue—save for Leguizamo's spirited way with words—that comes up distractingly flat."

Dan Jolin at Empire panned Walking with Dinosaurs as "insipid, bloodless, pseudo-educational and offensively anthropomorphised". Jolin applauded the visual effects but said that "the decision to insert chirp-pop songs and voice the principal dinosaurs" overshadowed the effects. Tom Meek, reviewing for Paste, also praised the effects as "a visual wonderment" but disparaged "the cutesy animal voices and personas". Aside from highlights like the line "Think outside the nest" and the song "Tusk" by Fleetwood Mac, Meek was disappointed by the dialogue and choice of music. Riley Black, reviewing for National Geographic, said the voiceovers ruined the film. She said where films like The Land Before Time and You Are Umasou (the latter based on the Japanese book of the same name) were children's films with meaningful dialogue, Walking with Dinosaurs instead had dialogue that "is vacuous and not only lacks emotional weight, but actually drains any emotions the audience might feel for the characters." Black said the film could be salvaged if its release on home media would include an option to watch it without the dialogue.

Some critics were more positive towards the film. Peter Bradshaw of The Guardian called it "a version of the 2000 Disney adventure Dinosaur, combined with March of the Penguins from 2005. Pretty silly – but reliable machine-tooled family fare for the holidays." Francesca Rudkin wrote for The New Zealand Herald "Walking with Dinosaurs may not offer a great deal for adults, but it will continue to feed kids' fascination with dinosaurs, and that's a good thing."

=== Home media ===
Walking with Dinosaurs was released on Blu-ray 2D and 3D and DVD in the United States on 25 March 2014. It ranked third in both Blu-ray sales and combined DVD and Blu-ray sales. It ranked below Disney's animated musical Frozen, which was in its second week of home media release, and The Wolf of Wall Street, which was also in its first week. Over 35% of sales for Walking with Dinosaurs were from Blu-ray sales. Around 4% of its total sales were Blu-ray discs in 3-D.

The Blu-ray 3D disc for Walking with Dinosaurs features bonus content including a "Cretaceous Cut" of the film that omits the voiceovers.

The film is available to watch on Disney+ in territories where Fox distributed the film.

== Walking With Dinosaurs: Prehistoric Planet 3D ==
In 2014, a shortened 45 minute version of Walking With Dinosaurs was released in 3D theaters across the U.S.A. Unlike the movie, this documentary is narrated by Benedict Cumberbatch in a style similar to that of the TV series, and removes the character names and dialogue. Unlike the series though, Prehistoric Planet 3D has a "profile" appear whenever a new prehistoric animal species shows up, which shows the animal's name and diet. The Gorgosaurus that appeared in the movie is referred to as Nanuqsaurus. This is probably because, other than a few possible indeterminate remains, Gorgosaurus is not known from Alaska, where as Nanuqsaurus is.

== See also ==
- List of films featuring dinosaurs
