= John Carnochan =

American film editor

John Carnochan (born in 1960) is a film editor. He is noted particularly for editing animated films, including Walt Disney Animation Studios' The Little Mermaid (1989), Beauty and the Beast (1991), and The Lion King (1994, co-edited by Tom Finan).

Upon completion of The Lion King, many employees left Disney with President Jeffrey Katzenberg to work at DreamWorks Animation, with Carnochan being one of them. He edited DreamWorks's 2nd film, The Road to El Dorado (2000, co-edited by Vicki Hiatt, Dan Molina, and Lynne Southerland). After working on The Road to El Dorado, Carnochan edited the first two films for Blue Sky Studios, Ice Age (2002) and Robots (2005). More recently, he worked on the films The Prince of Egypt, Fantasia 2000, The Simpsons Movie, Horton Hears a Who!, Arthur Christmas, Walking with Dinosaurs, The Book of Life, and Illumination's The Grinch.

Carnochan's first editorial job was on director Richard Rush's film The Stunt Man, as an assistant editor.

== Filmography ==
Year	Title	Position
1980	The Stunt Man	assistant editor
1981	Circle of Power	supervising film editor
1982	Silent Rage	assistant editor
1984	Heartbreakers	editor
1987	The Man Who Fell to Earth	editor
1989	The Little Mermaid	editor
1991	Beauty and the Beast	editor (edited by)
1994	The Lion King	editor
1998	The Prince of Egypt	additional editor
1999	Fantasia 2000	additional editor
2000	The Road to El Dorado	editor
2000	Chicken Run	additional storyreel editor
2000	The Little Mermaid II: Return to the Sea	story reel editor
2002	Return to Never Land	additional editor
2002	Ice Age	editor (edited by)
2003	101 Dalmatians II: Patch's London Adventure	additional editor
2005	Robots	editor (edited by)
2007	The Simpsons Movie	editor (edited by)
2008	Horton Hears a Who!	additional editor
2011	Arthur Christmas	editor (edited by)
2013	Walking with Dinosaurs	editor
2014	The Book of Life	additional editor
2018	The Grinch	additional editing
2021	Ron's Gone Wrong	additional editing
