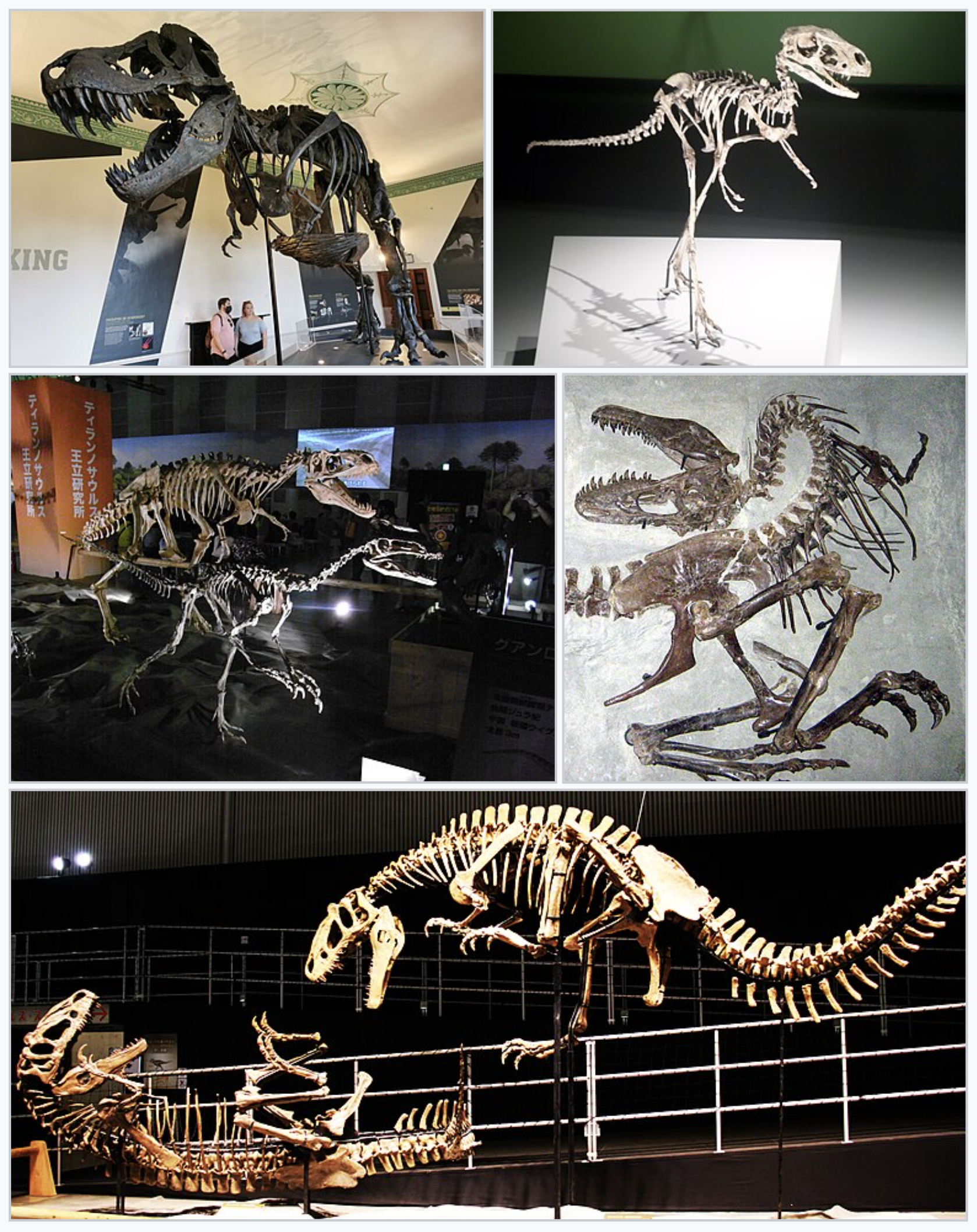
- Six tyrannosauroids (top left to bottom right): Tyrannosaurus, Dilong, Alioramus (background) with Guanlong (foreground), Gorgosaurus, and a pair of Yutyrannus

Scientific classification
- Kingdom: Animalia
- Phylum: Chordata
- Class: Reptilia
- Clade: Dinosauria
- Clade: Saurischia
- Clade: Theropoda
- Clade: Coelurosauria
- Clade: Tyrannoraptora
- Superfamily: †Tyrannosauroidea; Osborn, 1906 (vide Walker, 1964)

Type genus
- †Tyrannosaurus Osborn, 1905

Subgroups
- †Proceratosauridae
- †Pantyrannosauria Delcourt & Grillo, 2018
  - †Alectrosaurus
  - †Chingkankousaurus
  - †Dilong
  - †Eotyrannus
  - †Jinbeisaurus?
  - †Juratyrant
  - †Khankhuuluu
  - †Moros
  - †Stokesosaurus
  - †Suskityrannus
  - †Timurlengia
  - †Xiongguanlong
  - †Yutyrannus?
  - †Eutyrannosauria Delcourt & Grillo, 2018
    - †Appalachiosaurus
    - †Bagaraatan (possible chimera)
    - †Bistahieversor?
    - †Dryptosaurus
    - †Nanotyrannus
    - †Raptorex
    - †Tyrannosauridae
Possible tyrannosauroids
- †Aniksosaurus
- †Aviatyrannis
- †Coelurus
- †Gualicho
- †Iliosuchus
- †Labocania
- †Santanaraptor
- †Shaochilong
- †Siamotyrannus
- †Siats
- †Tanycolagreus
- †Timimus
- †Megaraptora

= Tyrannosauroidea =

Tyrannosauroidea Temporal range: Middle Jurassic-Late Cretaceous, 166–66 Ma Possible extended range if Iliosuchus is a tyrannosauroid.

Extinct superfamily of dinosaurs

Tyrannosauroidea (meaning 'tyrant lizard forms') is a superfamily (or clade) of coelurosaurian theropod dinosaurs that includes the family Tyrannosauridae as well as more basal relatives. Tyrannosauroids lived on the Laurasian supercontinent beginning in the Jurassic Period. By the end of the Cretaceous Period, tyrannosauroids were the dominant large predators in the Northern Hemisphere, culminating in the gigantic Tyrannosaurus. Fossils of tyrannosauroids have been recovered on what are now the continents of North America, Europe and Asia. If Megaraptora is part of Tyrannosauroidea, this would extend the distribution of the group to Australia and South America, and possible fragmentary remains of tyrannosauroids have also been reported from these continents.

Tyrannosauroids were bipedal carnivores, as were most theropods, and were characterized by numerous skeletal features, especially of the skull and pelvis. Early in their existence, tyrannosauroids were small predators with long, three-fingered forelimbs. Late Cretaceous genera became much larger, including some of the largest land-based predators ever to exist, but most of these later genera had proportionately small forelimbs with only two digits. Primitive feathers have been identified in fossils of two species and may have been present in other tyrannosauroids as well. Prominent bony crests in a variety of shapes and sizes on the skulls of many tyrannosauroids may have served display functions.

== Description ==
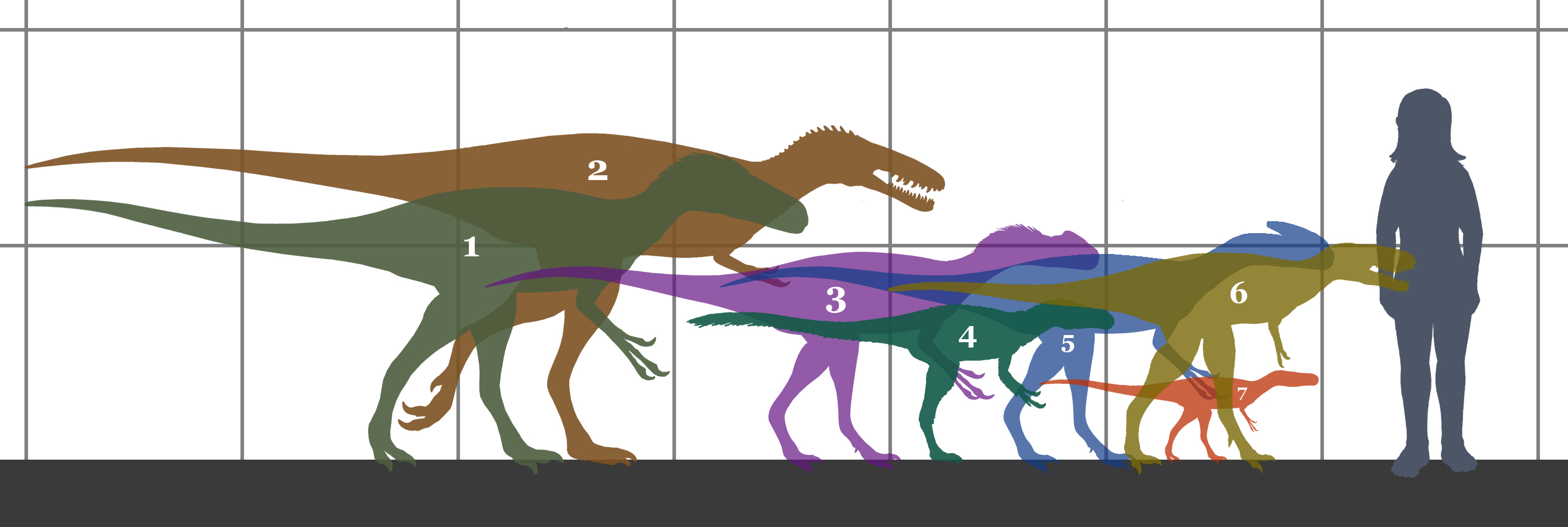
Size of some small genera, compared to a human.

Tyrannosauroids varied widely in size, although there was a general trend towards increasing size over time. Early tyrannosauroids were small animals. One specimen of Dilong, almost fully grown, measured 1.6 meters (5.2 feet) in length, and a fully grown Guanlong measured 3 meters (9.8 feet) long. Teeth from Lower Cretaceous rocks (140 to 136 million years old) of Hyogo, Japan, appear to have come from an approximately 5 metres (16 ft) long animal, possibly indicating an early size increase in the lineage. An immature Eotyrannus was over 4 meters (13 feet) in length, and a subadult Appalachiosaurus was estimated at more than 6 meters (20 feet) long, indicating that both genera reached larger sizes. The Late Cretaceous tyrannosaurids ranged from the 9 meters (30 feet) Albertosaurus and Gorgosaurus to Tyrannosaurus, which exceeded 12 meters (39 feet) in length and may have weighed more than 6,400 kilograms (7 short tons). A 2010 review of the literature concluded that tyrannosaurs were "small- to mid-sized" for their first 80 million years but were "some of the largest terrestrial carnivores to ever live" in their last 20 million years.

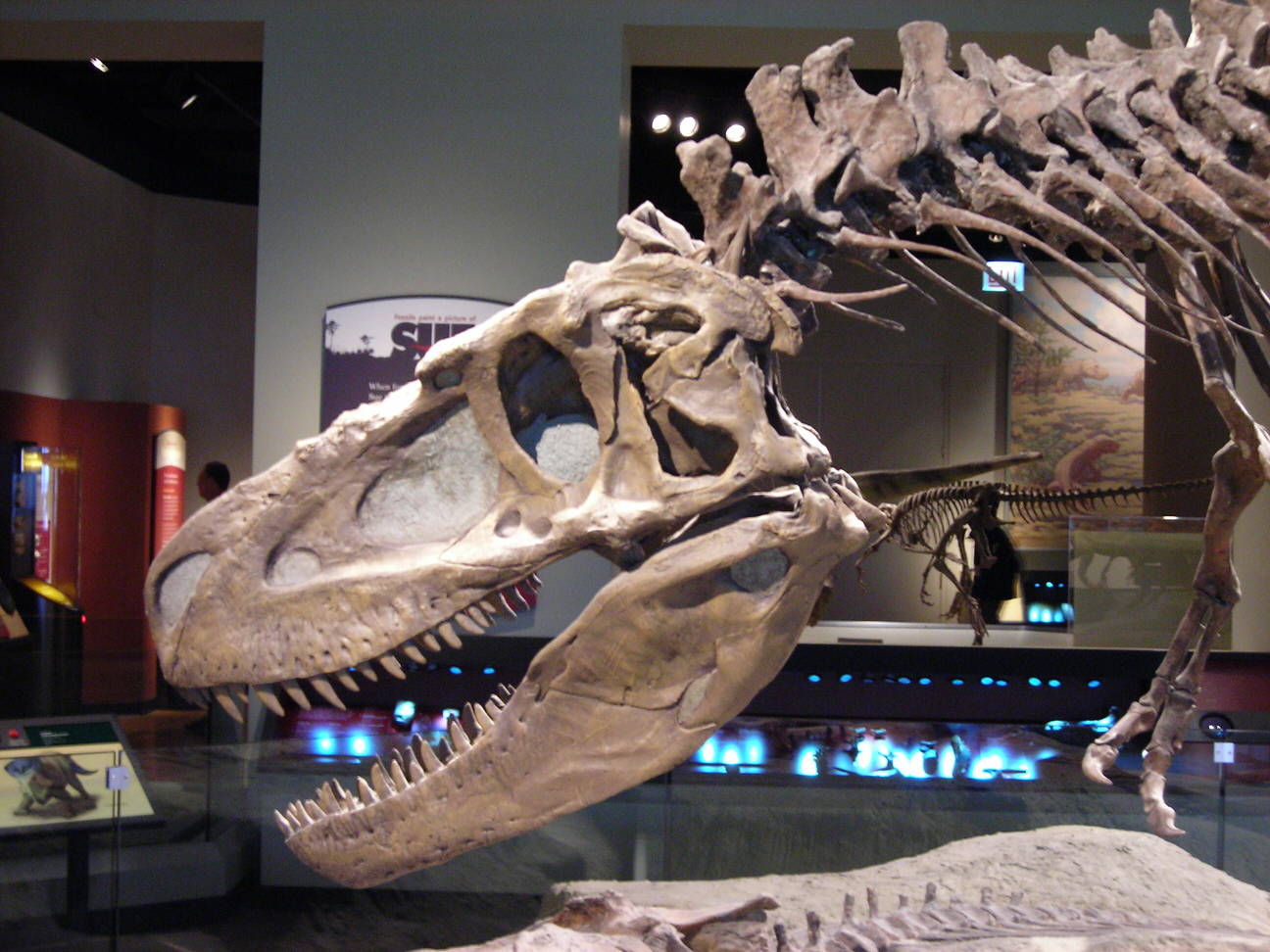
Skull and neck of Daspletosaurus, from the Field Museum of Natural History in Chicago.

Skulls of early tyrannosauroids were long, low and lightly constructed, similar to other coelurosaurs, while later forms had taller and more massive skulls. Despite the differences in form, certain skull features are found in all known tyrannosauroids. The premaxillary bone is very tall, blunting the front of the snout, a feature which evolved convergently in abelisaurids. The nasal bones are characteristically fused, arched slightly upwards and often very roughly textured on their upper surface. The premaxillary teeth at the front of the upper jaw are shaped differently from the rest of the teeth, smaller in size and with a D-shaped cross section. In the lower jaw, a prominent ridge on the surangular bone extends sideways from just below the jaw joint, except in the basal Guanlong.

Tyrannosauroids had S-shaped necks and long tails, as did most other theropods. Early genera had long forelimbs, about 60% the length of the hindlimb in Guanlong, with the typical three digits of coelurosaurs. The long forelimb persisted at least through the Early Cretaceous Eotyrannus, but is unknown in Appalachiosaurus. Derived tyrannosaurids have forelimbs strongly reduced in size, the most extreme example being Tarbosaurus from Mongolia, where the humerus was only one-quarter the length of the femur. The third digit of the forelimb was also reduced over time. This digit was unreduced in the basal Guanlong, while in Dilong it was more slender than the other two digits. Eotyrannus also had three functional digits on each hand. Tyrannosaurids had only two, although the vestigial metacarpal of the third are preserved in some well-preserved specimens. As in most coelurosaurs, the second digit of the hand is the largest, even when the third digit is not present. The radius is distally flattened, just like members of Maniraptora but unlike the condition seen in ornithomimosaurs and alvarezsaurids.

Characteristic features of the tyrannosauroid pelvis include a concave notch at the upper front end of the ilium, a sharply defined vertical ridge on the outside surface of the ilium, extending upwards from the acetabulum (hip socket), and a huge "boot" on the end of the pubis, more than half as long as the shaft of the pubis itself. These features are found in all known tyrannosauroids, including basal members Guanlong and Dilong. The pubis is not known in Aviatyrannis or Stokesosaurus but both show typical tyrannosauroid characters in the ilium. The hindlimbs of all tyrannosauroids, like most theropods, had four toes, although the first toe (the hallux) did not contact the ground. Tyrannosauroid hindlimbs are longer relative to body size than almost any other theropods, and outside of the largest forms show proportions characteristic of fast-running animals, including elongated tibiae and metatarsals. Elongated metatarsals are present even in the largest adult Tyrannosaurus in spite of the tibiae being proportionately shorter than in smaller tyrannosauroids and a probable inability to run (i.e move with an aerial phase where both feet are off the ground). The third metatarsal of tyrannosaurids, including in the very largest forms, was pinched at the top between the second and fourth, forming a structure known as the arctometatarsus that aided in energy conservation and, in smaller forms, increased speed. The arctometatarsus was also present in Appalachiosaurus. This structure was shared by derived ornithomimids, troodontids and caenagnathids, but was not present in basal tyrannosauroids like Dilong paradoxus, indicating convergent evolution.

== Classification ==
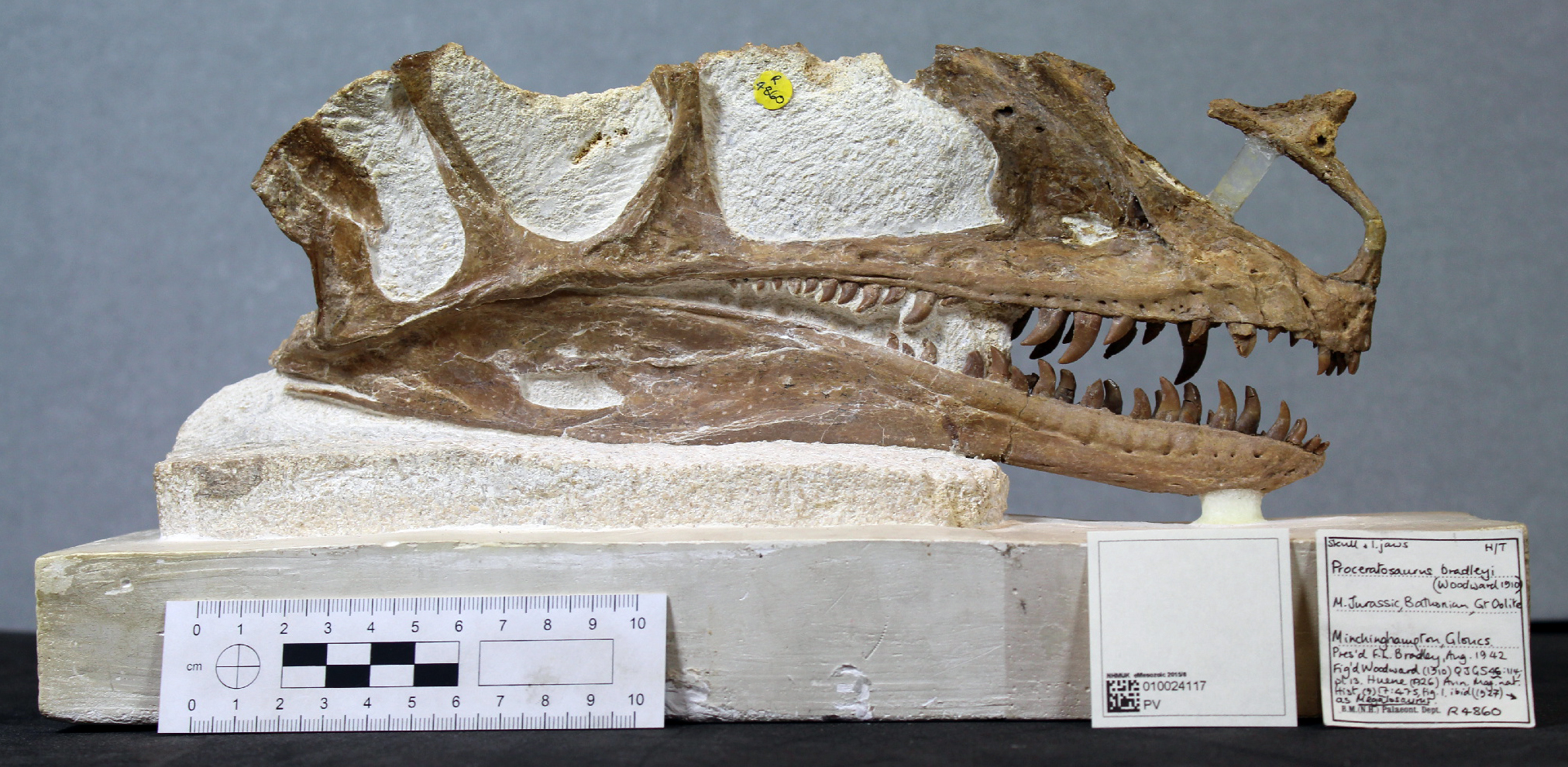
Skull of Proceratosaurus, a proceratosaurid tyrannosauroid from the Middle Jurassic of England.

Tyrannosaurus was named by Henry Fairfield Osborn in 1905, along with the family Tyrannosauridae. The name is derived from the Ancient Greek words τυραννος tyrannos ('tyrant') and σαυρος sauros ('lizard'). The superfamily name Tyrannosauroidea was first published in a 1964 paper by the British paleontologist Alick Walker. The suffix -oidea, commonly used in the name of animal superfamilies, is derived from the Greek ειδος eidos ('form').

Scientists have commonly understood Tyrannosauroidea to include the tyrannosaurids and their immediate ancestors. With the advent of phylogenetic taxonomy in vertebrate paleontology, however, the clade has received several more explicit definitions. The first was by Paul Sereno in 1998, where Tyrannosauroidea was defined as a stem-based taxon including all species sharing a more recent common ancestor with Tyrannosaurus rex than with neornithean birds. To make the family more exclusive, Thomas Holtz redefined it in 2004 to include all species more closely related to Tyrannosaurus rex than to Ornithomimus velox, Deinonychus antirrhopus or Allosaurus fragilis. Sereno published a new definition in 2005, using Ornithomimus edmontonicus, Velociraptor mongoliensis and Troodon formosus as external specifiers. The Sereno definition was adopted in a 2010 review.

Some studies have suggested that the clade Megaraptora, usually considered to be allosauroids, are basal tyrannosauroids. However, other authors disputed the placement of megaraptorans within Tyrannosauroidea, and a study of megaraptoran hand anatomy published in 2016 caused even the original scientists suggesting their tyrannosauroid relationships to at least partly reject their prior conclusion.

=== Phylogeny ===
While paleontologists have long recognized the family Tyrannosauridae, its ancestry has been the subject of much debate. For most of the twentieth century, tyrannosaurids were commonly accepted as members of the Carnosauria, which included almost all large theropods. Within this group, the allosaurids were often considered to be ancestral to tyrannosaurids. In the early 1990s, cladistic analyses instead began to place tyrannosaurids into the Coelurosauria, echoing suggestions first published in the 1920s. Tyrannosaurids are now universally considered to be large coelurosaurs.

In 1994, Holtz grouped tyrannosauroids with elmisaurids, ornithomimosaurs and troodonts into a coelurosaurian clade called Arctometatarsalia based on a common ankle structure where the second and fourth metatarsals meet near the tarsal bones, covering the third metatarsal when viewed from the front. Basal tyrannosauroids like Dilong, however, were found with non-arctometatarsalian ankles, indicating that this feature evolved convergently. Arctometatarsalia has been dismantled and is no longer used by most paleontologists, with tyrannosauroids usually considered to be basal coelurosaurs outside Maniraptoriformes. While many place tyrannosauroids as basal coelurosaurs, Paul Sereno in his 1990s analysis of theropods would find the Tyrannosaurs to be sister taxa to the Maniraptora with them being closer to birds than Ornithomimosaurs were. He called this group Tyrannoraptora (which in the absence of papers that recover a Tyrannosaur-maniraptoran clade), is a clade which contains most Coelurosaurs. A 2007 analysis found the family Coeluridae, including the Late Jurassic North American genera Coelurus and Tanycolagreus, to be the sister group of Tyrannosauroidea.

The most basal tyrannosauroid known from complete skeletal remains is Guanlong, a representative of the family Proceratosauridae. Other early taxa include Stokesosaurus and Aviatyrannis, known from far less complete material. The better-known Dilong is considered slightly more derived than Guanlong and Stokesosaurus. Dryptosaurus, long a difficult genus to classify, has turned up in several recent analyses as a basal tyrannosauroid as well, slightly more distantly related to Tyrannosauridae than Eotyrannus and Appalachiosaurus. Alectrosaurus, a poorly known genus from Mongolia, is definitely a tyrannosauroid but its exact relationships are unclear. Other taxa have been considered possible tyrannosauroids by various authors, including Bagaraatan and Labocania. Siamotyrannus from the Early Cretaceous of Thailand was originally described as an early tyrannosaurid, but is usually considered a carnosaur today. Iliosuchus has a vertical ridge on the ilium reminiscent of tyrannosauroids and may in fact be the earliest known member of the superfamily, but not enough material is known to be sure.

Below on the left is a cladogram of Tyrannosauroidea from a 2022 study by Darren Naish and Andrea Cau on the genus Eotyrannus, and on the right is a cladogram of Eutyrannosauria from a 2020 study by Jared T. Voris and colleagues on the genus Thanatotheristes:

- Tyrannosauroidea
  - - Juratyrant
    - Stokesosaurus
  - - Coeluridae
    - - Proceratosauridae
        - Dilong
        - - Guanlong
          - - Proceratosaurus
            - Sinotyrannus
      - - Yutyrannus
        - - Eotyrannus
          - - Xiongguanlong
            - - Megaraptora
                - Siats
                - - Aniksosaurus
                  - - Chilantaisaurus
                    - - Fukuiraptor
                      - Megaraptoridae
                        - Aerosteon
                        - Australovenator
                        - Megaraptor
                        - Orkoraptor
              - - Dryptosaurus
                - - Appalachiosaurus
                  - - - Bistahieversor
                      - Teratophoneus
                    - Tyrannosauridae

- Eutyrannosauria
  - Dryptosaurus aquilunguis
  - - Appalachiosaurus montgomeriensis
    - - Bistahieversor sealeyi
      - - Tyrannosauridae
          - Albertosaurinae
            - Gorgosaurus libratus
            - Albertosaurus sarcophagus
          - Tyrannosaurinae
            - Alioramini
              - Qianzhousaurus sinensis
              - - Alioramus remotus
                - Alioramus altai
            - - - Teratophoneus curriei
                - Dynamoterror dynastes
                - Lythronax argestes
              - - Nanuqsaurus hoglundi
                - - Daspletosaurini
                    - Thanatotheristes degrootorum
                    - - Daspletosaurus torosus
                      - Daspletosaurus horneri
                  - - Zhuchengtyrannus magnus
                    - - Tarbosaurus bataar
                      - Tyrannosaurus rex

==== Phylogeography ====
In 2018 authors Rafael Delcourt and Orlando Nelson Grillo published a phylogenetic analysis of Tyrannosauroidea which incorporated taxa from the ancient continent of Gondwana (which today consists of the southern hemisphere), such as Santanaraptor and Timimus, whose placement in the group has been controversial. They have found that not only Santanaraptor and Timimus were placed as tyrannosaurs more derived than Dilong, but they have found in their analysis that tyrannosauroids were widespread in Laurasia and Gondwana since the Middle Jurassic. They have proposed new subclade names for Tyrannosaurioidea. The first is Pantyrannosauria referring to all non-proceratosaurid members of the group, while Eutyrannosauria for larger tyrannosaur taxa found in the northern hemisphere such as Dryptosaurus, Appalachiosaurus, Bistahieversor, and Tyrannosauridae. Below is their phylogeographic tree they have recovered, in which displays the phylogenetic relationships of the taxa as well as the continents those taxa have been found.

- Tyrannosauroidea
  - Proceratosauridae
    - - Guanlong wucaii
      - - Proceratosaurus bradleyi
        - - Kileskus aristotocus
          - - Sinotyrannus kazuoensis
            - Yutyrannus huali
  - Pantyrannosauria
    - - Aviatyrannis jurassica
      - - Dilong paradoxus
        - - - Santanaraptor placidus
            - Timimus hermani
            - - - Stokesosaurus clevelandi
                - Juratyrant langhami
                - Eotyrannus lengi
              - - Xiongguanlong baimoensis
                - NMV P186046 ("Australian tyrannosaur")
                - - - Alectrosaurus olseni
                    - Timurlengia euotica
                  - Eutyrannosauria
                    - Dryptosaurus aquilunguis
                    - - Appalachiosaurus montgomeriensis
                      - - Bistahieversor sealeyi
                        - - Tyrannosauridae
                            - Albertosaurinae
                              - Gorgosaurus libratus
                              - Albertosaurus sarcophagus
                            - Tyrannosaurinae
                              - Alioramini
                                - Qianzhousaurus sinensis
                                - - Alioramus remotus
                                  - Alioramus altai
                              - - Nanuqsaurus hoglundi
                                - Teratophoneus curriei
                                - Lythronax argestes
                                - - - - Daspletosaurus torosus
                                      - Daspletosaurus horneri
                                  - - Zhuchengtyrannus magnus
                                    - - Tarbosaurus bataar
                                      - Tyrannosaurus rex

In 2021, Chase Brownstein published a research article based on more thorough descriptions of tyrannosauroid metatarsals and vertebra from the Merchantville Formation in Delaware. This reanalysis of phylogenetic relationships of tyrannosauroids in Appalachia has brought the rediscovery of the clade Dryptosauridae due to the similarities of metatarsals II and IV with the same bones in the Dryptosaurus holotype. However. the Merchantville taxon was found to still be different enough to separate it on the genus level from Dryptosaurus. In the phylogentic tree constructed Dryptosauridae is found to be a valid family of non tyrannosaurid eutyrannosaur. It currently sits in a polytomy with the Iren Dabasu taxon and more basal eutryannosaurs.

== Distribution ==
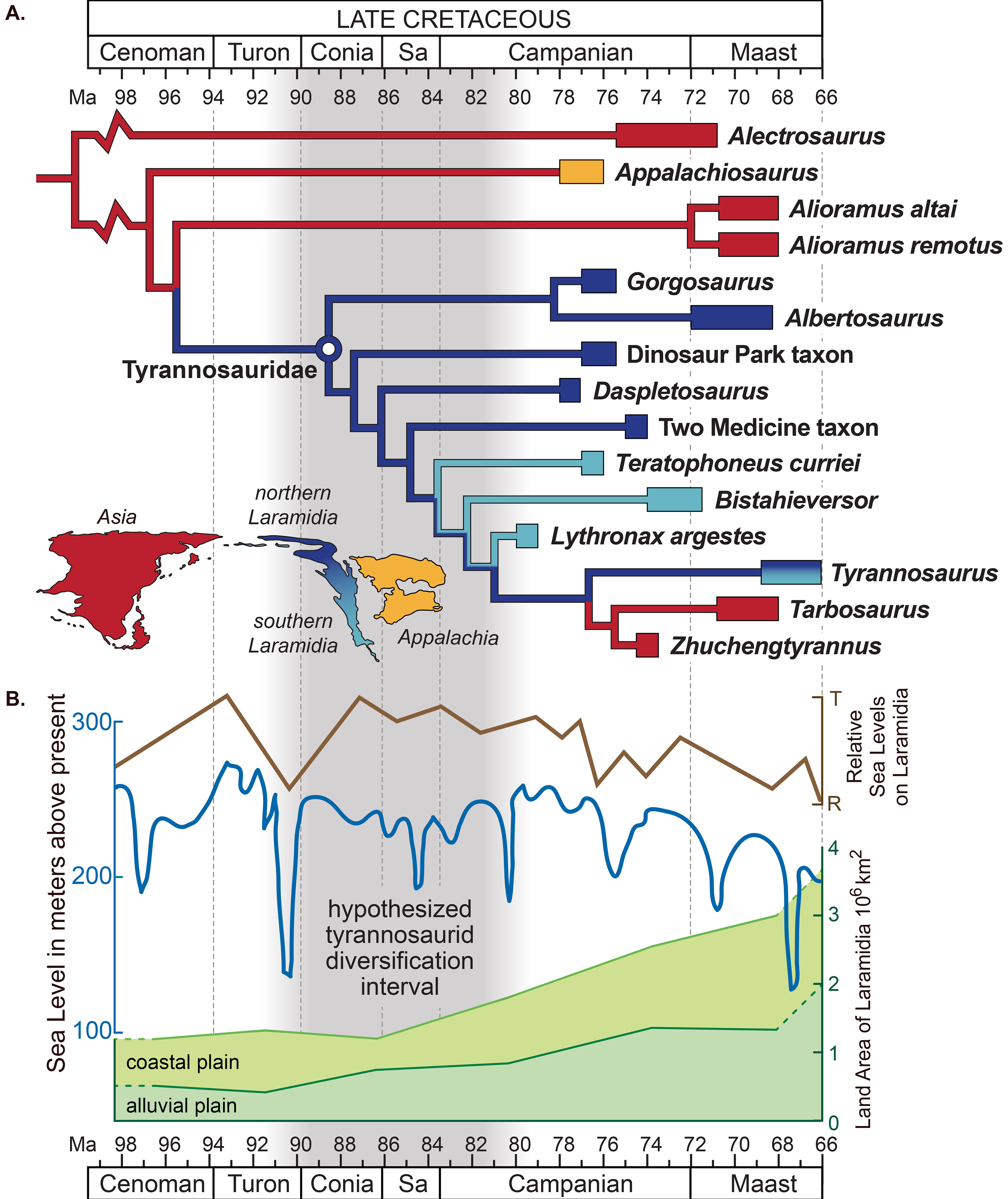
Visual showing the geographic, cladistic, and chronological distribution of the Tyrannosauroidea clade

The tyrannosauroids lived on the supercontinent Laurasia, which split from Gondwana in the Middle Jurassic. The earliest recognized tyrannosauroids lived in the Middle Jurassic, represented by the proceratosaurids Kileskus from the Western Siberia and Proceratosaurus from Great Britain. Upper Jurassic tyrannosauroids include Guanlong from China, Stokesosaurus from the western United States and Aviatyrannis and Juratyrant from Europe.

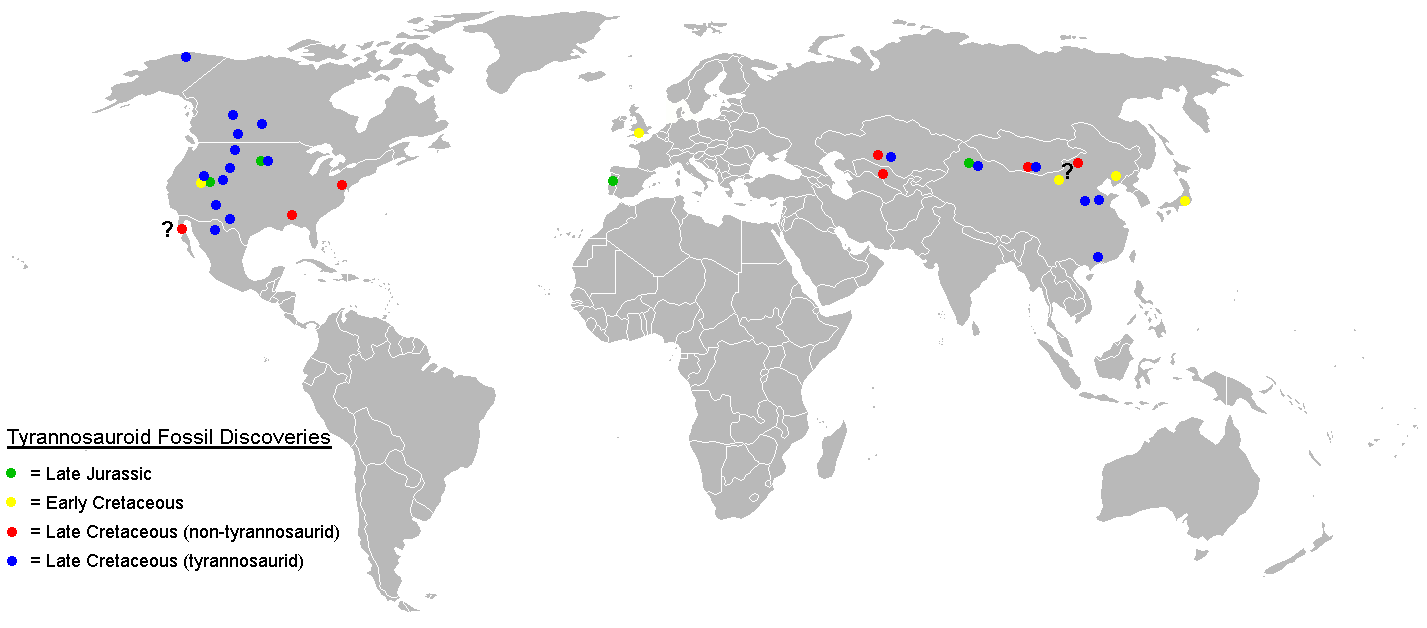
Confirmed tyrannosauroid fossils have only been discovered in the northern continents, with possible basal tyrannosauroid fossils reported from Australia. Late Cretaceous tyrannosauroids are known only from North America and Asia.

Early Cretaceous tyrannosauroids are known from Laurasia, being represented by Eotyrannus from England and Dilong, Sinotyrannus, and Yutyrannus from northeastern China. Early Cretaceous tyrannosauroid premaxillary teeth are known from the Cedar Mountain Formation in Utah and the Tetori Group of Japan.

The Middle Cretaceous record of Tyrannosauroidea is rather patchy. Teeth and indeterminate postcrania of this interval are known from the Cenomanian-age Dakota Formation of western North America and Potomac Formation of New Jersey, as well as formations in Kazakhstan and Tajikistan; two genera, Timurlengia and Xiongguanlong, have been found in Asia, while the Brazilian Santanaraptor may belong to this group. Suskityrannus has been found in the Moreno Hill Formation of the Zuni Basin of western New Mexico. The first unquestionable remains of tyrannosaurids occur in the Campanian stage of the Late Cretaceous in North America and Asia. Two subfamilies are recognized. The albertosaurines are only known from North America, while the tyrannosaurines are found on both continents. Tyrannosaurid fossils have been found in Alaska, which may have served as a land bridge allowing dispersal between the two continents. Non-tyrannosaurid tyrannosauroids like Alectrosaurus and possibly Bagaraatan were contemporaneous with tyrannosaurids in Asia, while they are absent from western North America. Eastern North America was divided by the Western Interior Seaway in the middle of the Cretaceous and isolated from the western portion of the continent. The absence of tyrannosaurids from the eastern part of the continent suggests that the family evolved after the appearance of the seaway, allowing basal tyrannosauroids like Dryptosaurus and Appalachiosaurus to survive in the east as a relict population until the end of the Cretaceous.

Basal tyrannosauroids have also been suggested to be present in Australia and South America during the Early Cretaceous. NMV P186069, a partial pubis (a hip bone) with a supposed distinctive tyrannosauroid-like form, was discovered in Dinosaur Cove in Victoria. However, a response suggested that critical tyrannosauroid characters were absent from the fossil. The Australian taxon Timimus, known from a femur, and the Brazilian Santanaraptor, known from a partial juvenile skeleton, have also been suggested to be tyrannosaurs. However, these placements have been considered questionable, with the supposed tyrannosauroid characters of Santanaraptor being widely distributed within Coelurosauria, in other characters having similarities to noasaurids.

== Paleobiology ==
=== Facial tissue ===
A conference paper by Tracy Ford states that there was rough bone texture on the skulls of theropods and higher foramina frequency than lepidosaurs and mammals which would be evidential for a sensitive snout for theropods. A study in 2017 study on a new tyrannosaurid named Daspletosaurus horneri was published in the journal Scientific Reports, where paleontologist Thomas Carr analyzed the craniofacial texture of Daspletosaurus horneri and observed a hummocky rugosity which compared to crocodilian skulls, suggesting Daspletosaurus horneri and with it all tyrannosaurids have flat sensory scales. The subordinate regions were analyzed to have cornified epidermis. However, a 2018 presentation has an alternative interpretation. Crocodilians do not have flat sensory scales, but rather cracked, cornified epidermis due to growth. The hummocky rugosity in the skulls of lepidosaurs have correlation with scales which this bone texture is also present in tyrannosaurid skulls. The foramina frequency in theropod skulls does not exceed 50 foramina, which shows that theropods had lips. It's been proposed that lips are a primitive trait in tetrapods and the soft tissue present in crocodilians are a derived trait because of aquatic or semiaquatic adaptations.

=== Body integument ===
Long filamentous structures have been preserved along with skeletal remains of numerous coelurosaurs from the Early Cretaceous Yixian Formation and other nearby geological formations from Liaoning, China. These filaments have usually been interpreted as "protofeathers," homologous with the branched feathers found in birds and some non-avian theropods, although other hypotheses have been proposed. A skeleton of Dilong paradoxus was described in 2004 that included the first example of feathers in a tyrannosauroid. Similarly to down feathers of modern birds, the feathers found in Dilong were branched but not pennaceous, and may have been used for insulation. Even large tyrannosauroids have been found with evidence of feathers. Yutyrannus huali, also from the Yixian Formation, is known from three specimens, each preserving traces of feathers on various parts of the body. While not all areas of the body preserve impressions across all three specimens, these fossils demonstrate that even in this medium-sized species, most of the body was covered in feathers.

The presence of feathers in basal tyrannosauroids is not surprising since they are now known to be characteristic of coelurosaurs, found in other basal genera like Sinosauropteryx, as well as all more derived groups. Rare fossilized skin impressions of some Late Cretaceous tyrannosaurids lack feathers, however, instead showing skin covered in fine, non-overlapping scales. Possibly, feathers were present on other areas of the body: preserved skin impressions are very small and come primarily from the legs, pelvic region, and underside of the tail, which either lack feathers or only covered in a light down in some modern large ground-dwelling birds. Alternatively, secondary loss of feathers in large tyrannosaurids may be analogous with the similar loss of hair in the largest modern mammals like elephants, where a low surface area-to-volume ratio slows down heat transfer, making insulation by a coat of hair unnecessary or even detrimental. A scientific publication by Phil Bell and colleagues in 2017 show that tyrannosaurids such as Gorgosaurus, Tarbosaurus, Albertosaurus, Daspletosaurus, and Tyrannosaurus had scales. The Bell et al. 2017 paper notes that the scale-like integument on bird feet were actually secondarily derived feathers according to paleontological and evolutionary developmental evidence so they hypothesize that the scaly skin preserved on some tyrannosaurid specimens might be secondarily derived from filamentous appendages like on Yutyrannus although strong evidence is needed to support this hypothesis. However, other paleontologists argue that taphonomy is the possible cause of the lack of filamentous structures in tyrannosaurid fossils.

=== Head crests ===
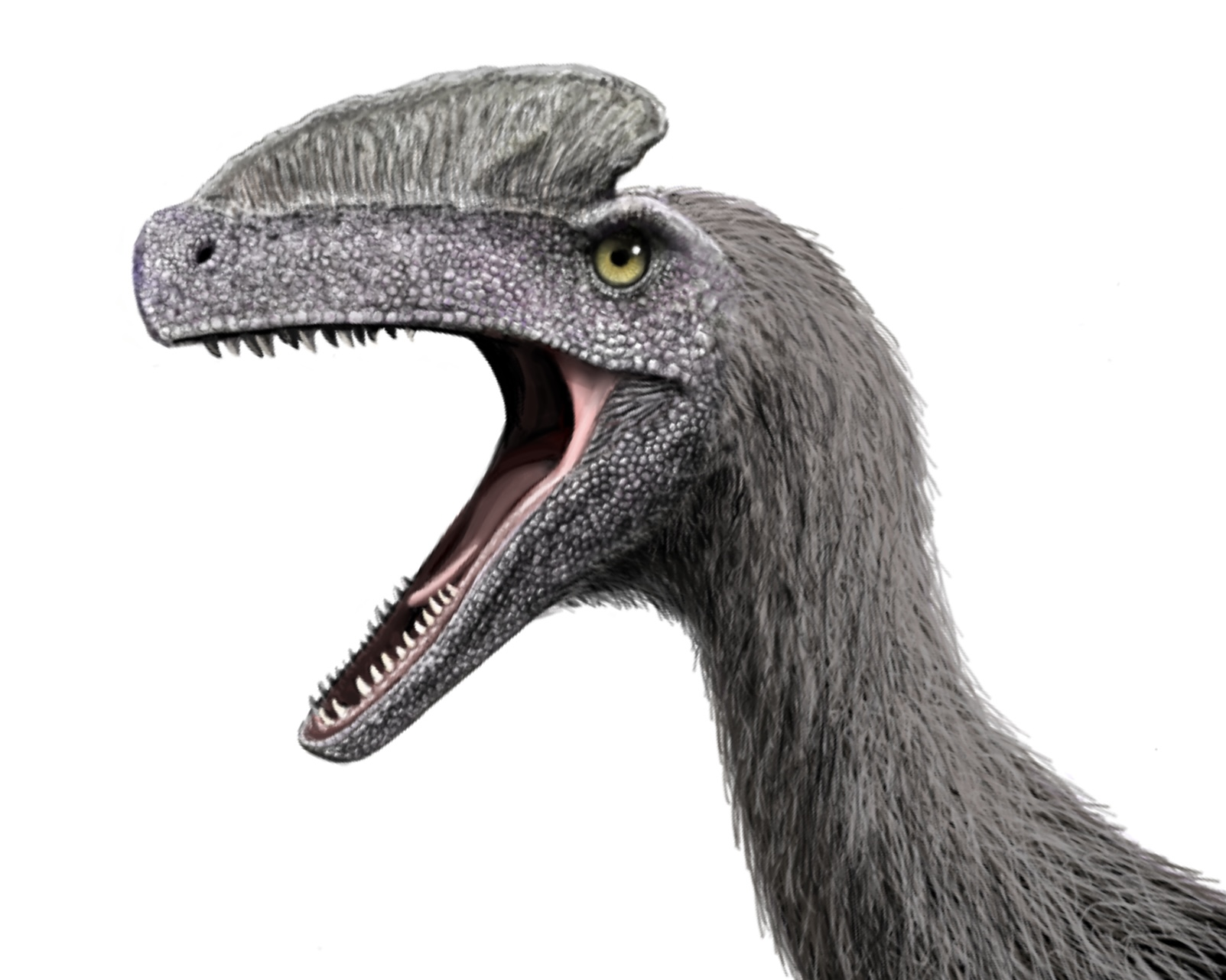
The elaborate head crest of Guanlong, a basal tyrannosauroid from China.

Bony crests are found on the skulls of many theropods, including numerous tyrannosauroids. The most elaborate is found in Guanlong, where the nasal bones support a single, large crest which runs along the midline of the skull from front to back. This crest was penetrated by several large foramina (openings) which reduced its weight. A less prominent crest is found in Dilong, where low, parallel ridges run along each side of the skull, supported by the nasal and lacrimal bones. These ridges curve inwards and meet just behind the nostrils, making the crest Y-shaped. The fused nasals of tyrannosaurids are often very rough-textured. Alioramus, a possible tyrannosaurid from Mongolia, bears a single row of five prominent bony bumps on the nasal bones; a similar row of much lower bumps is present on the skull of Appalachiosaurus, as well as some specimens of Daspletosaurus, Albertosaurus, and Tarbosaurus. In Albertosaurus, Gorgosaurus and Daspletosaurus, there is a prominent horn in front of each eye on the lacrimal bone. The lacrimal horn is absent in Tarbosaurus and Tyrannosaurus, which instead have a crescent-shaped crest behind each eye on the postorbital bone.

These head crests may have been used for display, perhaps for species recognition or courtship behavior. An example of the handicap principle may be the case of Guanlong, where the large, delicate crest may have been a hindrance to hunting in what was presumably an active predator. If an individual was healthy and successful at hunting despite the fragile crest, it would indicate the superior quality of the individual over others with smaller crests. Similarly to the unwieldy tail of a male peacock or the outsized antlers of an Irish elk, the crest of Guanlong may have evolved via sexual selection, providing an advantage in courtship that outweighed any decrease in hunting ability.

=== Reproduction ===
Neonate sized tyrannosaur fossils have been documented in the scientific literature.

== See also ==
- Specimens of Tyrannosaurus
