= Animal Logic =

Australian visual effects and computer animation studio

- Type: Subsidiary
- Industry: CGI, visual effects and animation Motion pictures
- Founded: 26 July 1991; 35 years ago
- Founders: Zareh Nalbandian; Chris Godfrey
- Defunct: 5 January 2024; 2 years ago
- Fate: Merged into Netflix Animation Studios
- Successor: Netflix Animation Studios
- Headquarters: Sydney, New South Wales, Australia
- Number of locations: Rideback Ranch, Los Angeles, California, U.S. Vancouver, British Columbia, Canada
- Key people: Sharon Taylor (Head of Production, Netflix Animation)
- Products: Visual effects; Animated films
- Number of employees: 800 (2022)
- Parent: Netflix Animation Studios (2022–2024)
- Divisions: Animal Logic Entertainment; Truant Pictures
- Website: animallogic.com

Animal Logic (also known as Animal Logic VFX) was an Australian visual effects and computer animation digital studio based at Disney Studios in Sydney, New South Wales, Vancouver, British Columbia, Canada, and Rideback Ranch in Los Angeles, California, United States. Established in 1991, Animal Logic had produced visual effects and animation for feature films such as the Academy Award-winning Happy Feet, Legend of the Guardians: The Owls of Ga'Hoole, Walking with Dinosaurs 3D, The Lego Movie and Peter Rabbit. The company was also recognized for its work as lead visual effects vendor on Baz Luhrmann's The Great Gatsby, which won Outstanding Achievement in Visual Effects at the 3rd AACTA Awards ceremony. In 2018, Peter Rabbit was presented with a range of accolades, including the AACTA Award for Best Visual Effects or Animation, and Australian Production Design Guild Awards (APDG) in Visual Effects Design and Drawing, Concept Illustration & Concept Models for Screen. Most recently, the company has produced work for the Warner Animation Group's The Lego Movie 2: The Second Part and Marvel Studios' Captain Marvel. Animal Logic's animation and effects department was acquired by Netflix in 2022 and the new company was named Netflix Animation Studios in Sydney and Vancouver.

Initially, Animal Logic's core business was the design and production of high-end animation and visual effects for commercials and television programs, and early success within these fields provided a platform for expansion into feature film work. Animal Logic went on to produce visual effects for various large budget feature film projects, including Babe, Babe: Pig in the City, The Matrix, Moulin Rouge!, Hero, House of Flying Daggers, Planet of the Apes, Harry Potter and the Goblet of Fire, World Trade Center, Fool's Gold, 300, Knowing, Australia, Sucker Punch, and The Great Gatsby.

== History ==
In 1991, Zareh Nalbandian and Chris Godfrey formed and founded a digital studio in Crows Nest, Sydney, Australia. The company was born out of Video Paint Brush Company, which Nalbandian, who had worked there for a few years, and his colleague Godfrey acquired in a management buy-out and renamed Animal Logic.

Animal Logic moved to Fox Studios Australia in Moore Park, Sydney, in 1998. In 2003, Animal Logic began work on its first computer-animated feature film, Happy Feet, for director George Miller. Released in the United States on 17 November 2006, the project saw the company expand significantly, recruiting up to 300 artists and technicians from Australia and around the world. Happy Feet, which was the first computer-animated feature film produced in Australia, went on to win the Academy Award for Best Animated Feature as well as the new BAFTA Award for Best Animated Film.

Their full-length feature animation, Legend of the Guardians: The Owls of Ga'Hoole, was released on 24 September 2010 and was Australia's first animated feature to be released in 3D. From 2004 to 2007, the company produced the CN City bumpers for Cartoon Network. In 2011, the company produced and animated LEGO Star Wars: The Padawan Menace, a 30-minute TV special. Produced for Lucasfilm and Cartoon Network, the special premiered in the United States on Cartoon Network and was followed by a worldwide DVD and Blu-ray release. In 2012, Animal Logic acquired the assets of fellow Australian visual effects studio Fuel VFX, known for their work on feature films such as Iron Man 3, Prometheus, The Avengers, Mission: Impossible – Ghost Protocol, Cowboys & Aliens, Captain America: The First Avenger and Thor. Fuel VFX was nominated for a Visual Effects Society Award and a BAFTA Award for Best Special Visual Effects for their work on Prometheus. 2012 also saw the release of the Animal Logic-animated "Polar Bowl" campaign, consisting of a 60-second and two 30-second commercials that aired at halftime at the Super Bowl XLVI. The campaign aimed to re-launch the iconic Coca-Cola polar bear characters to a new generation. Following the success of the 3 spots, which were viewed by over 160 million people globally, the company went on to animate a 6-minute short film directed by John Stevenson to headline Coca-Cola's 2013 global campaign. The film was first released through YouTube in December 2012, followed by a worldwide international theater release. In 2013, the company led visual effects and animation work on BBC Earth and Evergreen Films' 3D live-action feature Walking with Dinosaurs 3D.

In 2014, Animal Logic provided animation services for the 2014 film The Lego Movie, which was produced by the Warner Animation Group and directed by Phil Lord and Christopher Miller. After the film's huge success, the company was split into three subsidiaries operating under the Animal Logic's group: Animal Logic VFX, Animal Logic Animation, and Animal Logic Entertainment, a Los Angeles-based arm tasked with developing VFX, animation and hybrid feature films for the company. The following year, the company opened a 45,000 square feet (4,200 m^{2}) facility in Vancouver, British Columbia, Canada. The new studio initially produced work for The Lego Movie 2: The Second Part, the first in a three-film deal with Warner Bros. Pictures, all of which were to be developed in Canada.

In 2017, Animal Logic and the University of Technology Sydney launched a joint venture named the UTS Animal Logic Academy, offering a one-year accelerated Master of Animation and Visualisation. Taught by industry professionals, the Academy mimics the workflows and processes of a 3D animation/VFX studio to produce two student short films a year, with students specialising in their chosen discipline to the standard of a junior position in the industry. Since 2017, the Academy has also offered various other short courses, and a Technical Direction for 3D Animation and Graphics Projects subject open to all undergraduate students at UTS.

In July 2022, Netflix announced plans to acquire Animal Logic in an all-cash deal. In January 2024, it was announced that the studio would merge with Netflix Animation, with CEO Sharon Taylor resigning and Netflix Animation's Karen Toliver taking her place to lead the studio. Taylor would later return to Netflix Animation as head of production in June 2024.

== Filmography ==
Year	Production	Credit	Studio	Ref.
2023	Leo	Animation Studio	Netflix	
2023	The Magician's Elephant	Animation Studio	Netflix	
2022	DC League of Super-Pets	Animation Studio	Warner Bros. Pictures; Warner Animation Group	
2021	Peter Rabbit 2: The Runaway	Production Company/Animation Studio	Columbia Pictures	
2019	Captain Marvel	Visual Effects	Marvel Studios	
2019	The Lego Movie 2: The Second Part	Production Company/Animation Studio	Warner Bros. Pictures; Warner Animation Group	
2018	Peter Rabbit	Production Company/Animation Studio	Columbia Pictures; Sony Pictures Animation	
2017	The Lego Ninjago Movie	Production Company/Animation Studio	Warner Bros. Pictures; Warner Animation Group	
2017	The Lego Batman Movie	Production Company/Animation Studio	Warner Bros. Pictures; Warner Animation Group	
2017	Guardians of the Galaxy Vol. 2	Visual Effects	Marvel Studios	
2017	Alien: Covenant	Visual Effects	20th Century Fox	
2016	The Great Wall	Visual Effects	Universal Pictures; Legendary Pictures	
2016	Doctor Strange	Visual Effects	Marvel Studios	
2016	The Divergent Series: Allegiant	Visual Effects	Summit Entertainment	
2016	Captain America: Civil War	Visual Effects	Marvel Studios	
2016	The Master	Production Company	Warner Bros. Pictures	
2015	Monk Comes Down the Mountain	Visual Effects	Columbia Pictures	
2015	Avengers: Age of Ultron	Visual Effects	Marvel Studios	
2015	The Divergent Series: Insurgent	Visual Effects	Summit Entertainment	
2014	Unbroken	Visual Effects	Universal Pictures; Legendary Pictures	
2014	Alexander and the Terrible, Horrible, No Good, Very Bad Day	Production Company	Walt Disney Pictures	
2014	The Rover	Visual Effects	A24	
2014	The Lego Movie	Production Company/Animation Studio	Warner Bros. Pictures; Warner Animation Group; Village Roadshow Pictures	
2014	X-Men: Days of Future Past	Visual Effects	20th Century Fox	
2013	Walking with Dinosaurs 3D	Animation and Visual Effects Studio	20th Century Fox	
2013	The Great Gatsby	Visual Effects	Warner Bros. Pictures	
2013	Iron Man 3	Visual Effects	Marvel Studios	
2012	The Polar Bears	Production Company/Animation Studio	The Coca-Cola Company	
2011	Harry Potter and the Deathly Hallows – Part 2	3D Digital Services	Warner Bros. Pictures	
2011	Sucker Punch	Visual Effects	Warner Bros. Pictures	
2011	Lego Star Wars: The Padawan Menace	Production Company	Lucasfilm	
2010	Legend of the Guardians: The Owls of Ga'Hoole	Production Company/Animation Studio	Warner Bros. Pictures; Village Roadshow Pictures	
2009	Knowing	Visual Effects	Summit Entertainment	
2008	Australia	Visual Effects	20th Century Fox	
2008	The Black Balloon	Visual Effects	Icon Entertainment International	
2008	Fool's Gold	Visual Effects	Warner Bros. Pictures	
2007	28 Weeks Later	Digital Visual Effects	20th Century Fox	
2007	Clubland	Front Title Design	N/A	
2007	Crocodile Dreaming	Special Effects Company	N/A	
2006	300	Visual Effects	Warner Bros. Pictures	
2006	Charlotte's Web	Film Scanning	Paramount Pictures	
2006	Happy Feet	Production Company/Animation Studio	Warner Bros. Pictures; Village Roadshow Pictures	
2006	David Tench Tonight	Animation	Network Ten	
2006	World Trade Center	Additional Visual Effects	Paramount Pictures	
2006	The Silence	Visual Effects	N/A	
2006	Aquamarine	Visual Effects	20th Century Fox	
2005	Harry Potter and the Goblet of Fire	Visual Effects	Warner Bros. Pictures	
2005	The Cave	Additional Previsualization	Screen Gems	
2005	The Great Raid	Visual Effects	Miramax Films	
2005	Stealth	Visual Effects	Columbia Pictures	
2005	Little Fish	Visual Effects	Icon Film Distribution	
2004	Farscape: The Peacekeeper Wars	Visual Effects	The Jim Henson Company	
2004	Anacondas: The Hunt for the Blood Orchid	Opening Titles	Screen Gems	
2004	My Sister	Digital Film Transfer	N/A	
2004	House of Flying Daggers	Visual Effects	Sony Pictures Classics	
2003	XMA: Xtreme Martial Arts	Special Effects Company	N/A	
2003	In the Cut	Visual Effects	Pathe; Screen Gems	
2003	Danny Deckchair	Titles and Opticals	Lionsgate	
2003	The Matrix Reloaded	Visual Effects	Warner Bros. Pictures	
2003	Swimming Upstream	Special Effects Company	Metro-Goldwyn-Mayer	
2003	Darkness Falls	Special Effects Company	Revolution Studios; Columbia Pictures	
2002	Ang agimat: Anting-anting ni Lolo	Digital Tape to Film Transfer	Imus Productions	
2002	Hero	Special Effects Company	Sil-Metropole Organisation	
2002	Garage Days	Special Effects Company	Fox Searchlight Pictures	
2002	The Quiet American	Special Effects Company	Miramax Films	
2002	Mano Po	Digital Tape To Film Transfer	Regal Entertainment	
2002	The Crocodile Hunter: Collision Course	VFX and CG	Metro-Goldwyn-Mayer	
2002	Rabbit-Proof Fence	Visual Effects	Becker Entertainment	
2001	Charlotte Gray	Special Effects Company	Working Title Films	
2001	The Lord of the Rings: The Fellowship of the Ring	Visual Effects	New Line Cinema	
2001	Planet of the Apes	Special Effects Company	20th Century Fox	
2001	Moulin Rouge!	Special Effects Company	20th Century Fox	
2001	South Pacific	Visual Effects	ABC	
2000	Chopper	Special Effects Company	Mushroom Pictures	
2000	Devi Putrudu	Scanning	Sumanth Art Productions	
2000	Mr. Accident	Visual Effects	United Artists	
1999	Me Myself I	Visual Effects and CG	Sony Pictures Classics	
1999	Holy Smoke!	Special Effects Company	Miramax Films	
1999	The Incredible Genie	Digital Effects	N/A	
1999	Strange Planet	Title Design and Production, Visual Effects	New Vision Films	
1999	The Matrix	Special Effects Company	Warner Bros. Pictures	
1999	Farscape	Visual Effects	The Jim Henson Company	
1998	The Thin Red Line	Special Effects Company	20th Century Fox	
1998	Babe: Pig in the City	Special Effects Company	Universal Pictures	
1998	In the Winter Dark	Special Effects Company	Goalpost Pictures	
1997	Mouse Hunt	Additional Visual Effects	DreamWorks Pictures	
1997	Heaven's Burning	Digital Opticals	N/A	
1997	Thank God He Met Lizzie	Title Design	N/A	
1997	Face/Off	Additional Visual Effects, Titles	Paramount Pictures; Touchstone Pictures	
1997	Blackrock	Special Effects Company	PolyGram Filmed Entertainment	
1995	Babe	Special Effects Company	Universal Pictures	
1994	Little Women	Title Design	Columbia Pictures	
1991	The Girl From Tomorrow	Visual Effects	Film Australia	

== Awards ==
=== Film ===
Year	Award	Title
2018	APDG Award in Visual Effects Design	Peter Rabbit
2018	APDG Award in Drawing, Concept Illustration & Concept Models for Screen	Peter Rabbit
2018	AACTA Award for Best Visual Effects or Animation	Peter Rabbit
2015	AACTA Award for Best Visual Effects or Animation	The LEGO Batman Movie
2014	BAFTA Award for Best Animated Film	The LEGO Movie
2014	AACTA Award for Best Visual Effects or Animation	The LEGO Movie
2014	Critics' Choice Movie Award for Best Animated Feature	The LEGO Movie
2014	BAFTA Children's Award for Best Feature Film 2014	The LEGO Movie
2014	New York Film Critics Circle for Best Animated Film of the Year	The LEGO Movie
2013	AACTA Award for Outstanding Achievement in Visual Effects	The Great Gatsby
2013	AEAF Award for Visual Effects	The Great Gatsby
2011	AACTA Award for Best Visual Effects	Legend of the Guardians: The Owls of Ga'Hoole
2009	AFI Award for Best Visual Effects	Australia
2008	Satellite Award for Best Visual Effects	Australia
2007	Washington, DC Area Film Critic Award for Best Animated Film of the Year	Happy Feet
2007	Los Angeles Film Critics Association Award: Best Animation	Happy Feet
2007	Academy Award for Best Animated Feature	Happy Feet
2007	New York Film Critics Circle for Best Animated Film of the Year	Happy Feet
2007	New York Film Critics Online for Best Animated Film of the Year	Happy Feet
2005	Satellite Award for Best Visual Effects	House of Flying Daggers
2005	AIMIA Awards, Finalist – Best Entertainment Award Category	Stealth
2003	Satellite Award for Best Visual Effects	Moulin Rouge!

=== Design ===
Year	Award	Title
2012	Silver Award Awards for Craft in Film (Animation)	SBS: Seven Billion Stories and Counting
2007	World Gold Medal for Most Innovative Music Video	Telemetry Orchestra, Under the Cherry Tree
2006	AEAF Award, Best Music Video	Telemetry Orchestra, Under the Cherry Tree
2005	Digital Imaging Awards for Best Print Advertising Melbourne	Smirnoff, Letterbar
2005	ATV Award for Best Program Subtitle Sequence	Spicks and Specks
2005	ATV Award for Best Image Promotion, Highly Commended	Cartoon Network
2005	ATV Award for Best Program Subtitle Sequence, Highly Commended	Margaret and David at the Movies
2004	New York Festivals Award for Best Promotions Spot	Cartoon Network

=== Industry ===
Year	Award
2014	Inaugural NSW Creative Laureate
2013	51st Australian Export Awards, Creative Industries Award
2013	51st Australian Export Awards, Creative Industries Award
2013	Premier's NSW Exporter of the Year Award
2012	Australia Network Arts and Entertainment Exporter of the Year Award
2012	Premier's NSW Exporter of the Year Award (Arts and Entertainment)
2010	AFI Byron Kennedy Award for Outstanding Creative Enterprise
