= Orbi =

Theme park in Yokohama, Japan

Orbi Yokohama
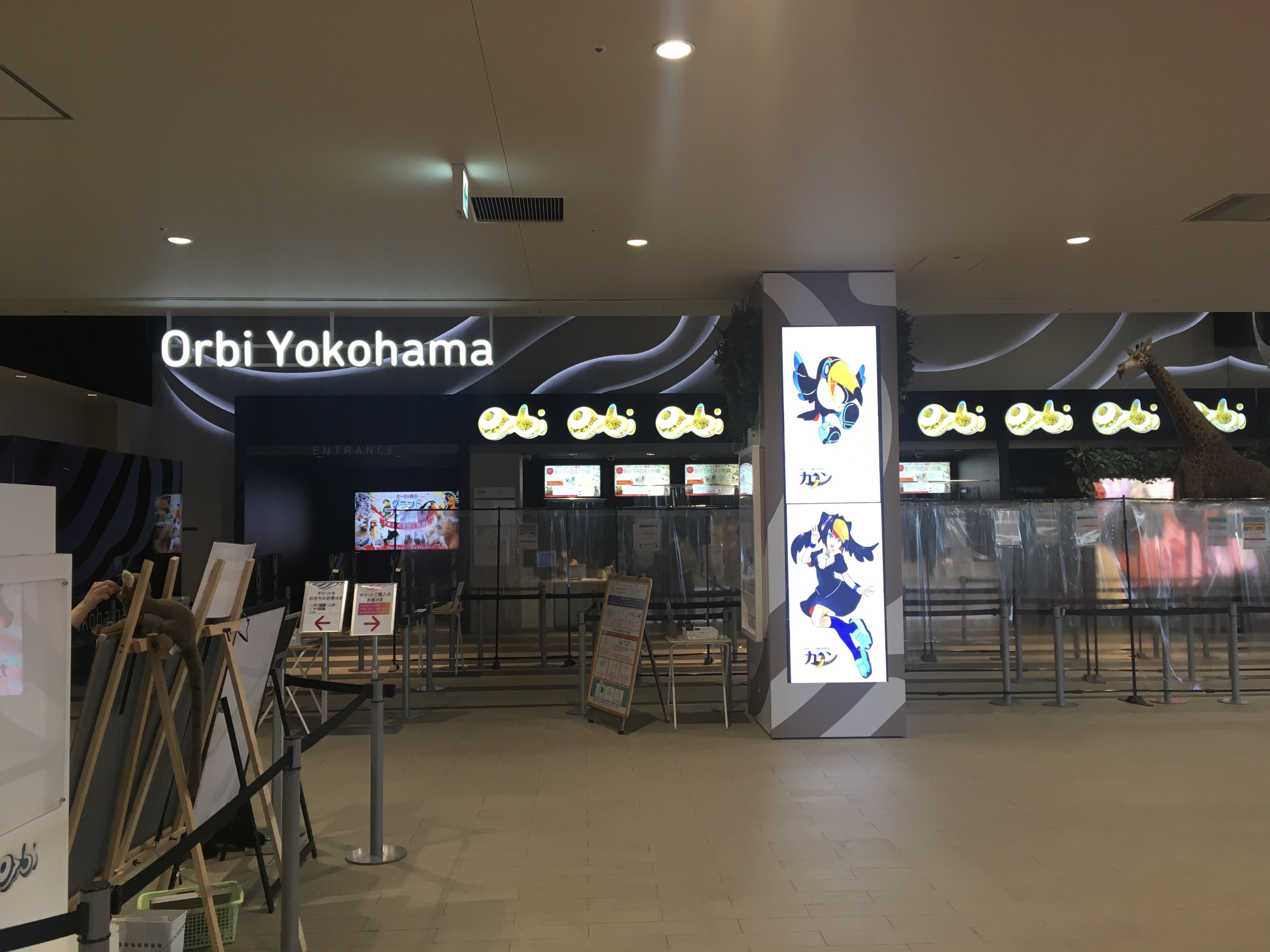
- Interactive map of Orbi Yokohama
- Location: Yokohama, Japan
- Coordinates: 35°27′26″N 139°37′56″E
- Status: Defunct
- Opened: 19 August 2013
- Closed: 31 December 2020
- Owner: Sega, BBC Earth

Attractions
- Total: 13

Orbi Yokohama was a wildlife theme park in Yokohama, Japan, which opened on 19 August 2013. The indoor park contained over 12 exhibitions, a shop and an 80-seat café. Orbi's main feature was a 23.4-degree theatre that was 8m tall and 40m wide and which showcased three wildlife films. The park was a joint venture between Sega and BBC Earth.

The park permanently closed on 31 December 2020.

== Exhibitions ==
- Animalpedia
- Earth Cruising
- World Transporter: African Elephants
- On location in 4D: Mountain Gorilla
- Frozen: Mt. Kenya
- Ocean Explorer
- Mega Bugs Playground
- Earth Canvas
- Basecamp
- Animal Selfie
- Time Capture
- Extreme Photospot

== Theatre 23.4 shows ==
- Rise Of The Temple King
- Roxy's Island Adventure
- Magic of Yellowstone
- The Meerkats
- Ice Worlds
- Voyagers
- MAX-THE HUNGRY PENGUIN-

== Orbi Osaka ==
On 29 January 2016, Sega Live Creation and BBC Earth opened a second Orbi location, in Osaka, Japan. This location closed on September 30, 2018, after the licensing agreement for the location was terminated.
