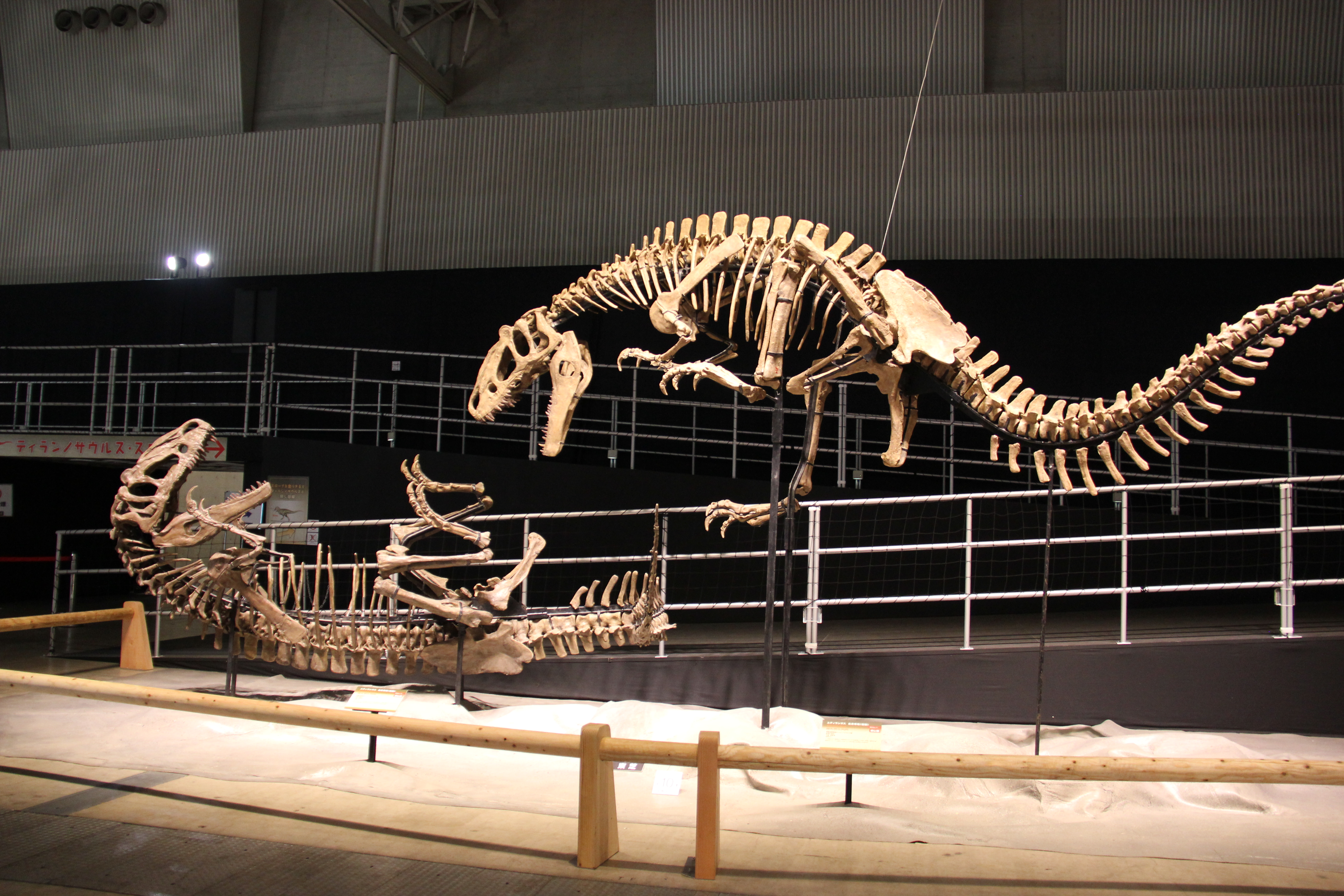
- Restored skeletons mounted in fighting poses

Scientific classification
- Kingdom: Animalia
- Phylum: Chordata
- Class: Reptilia
- Clade: Dinosauria
- Clade: Saurischia
- Clade: Theropoda
- Superfamily: †Tyrannosauroidea
- Family: †Proceratosauridae
- Genus: †Yutyrannus; Xu et al., 2012
- Species: †Y. huali

Binomial name
- †Yutyrannus huali Xu et al., 2012

= Yutyrannus =

Yutyrannus Temporal range: Early Cretaceous, ~125 Ma

Extinct genus of theropod dinosaurs

Yutyrannus (meaning "feathered tyrant") is a genus of proceratosaurid tyrannosauroid dinosaur which contains a single known species, Yutyrannus huali. This species lived during the early Cretaceous period in what is now northeastern China. Three fossils of Yutyrannus huali — all found in the rock beds of Liaoning Province — are the largest-known dinosaur specimens that preserve direct evidence of feathers.

== Discovery and naming ==
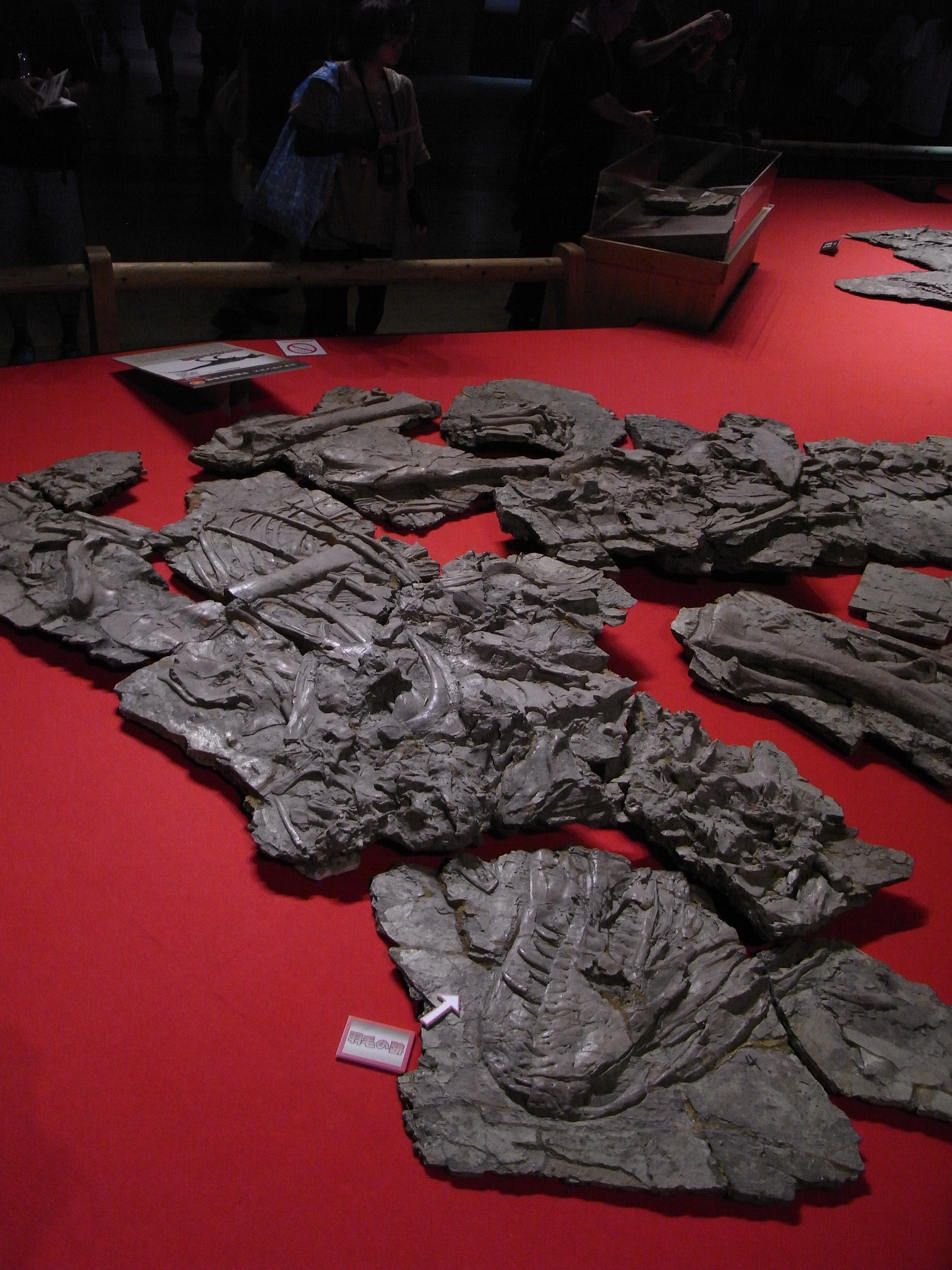
Fossils on display

Yutyrannus huali was named and scientifically described in 2012 by Xu Xing et al. The name is derived from Mandarin Chinese yǔ (羽, "feather") and Latinised Greek tyrannos (τύραννος, "tyrant"), a reference to its classification as a feathered member of the Tyrannosauroidea. The specific name consists of the Mandarin huáli (华丽 simplified, 華麗 traditional, "beautiful"), in reference to the perceived beauty of the plumage.

Yutyrannus is known from three nearly complete fossil specimens (an adult, a subadult and a juvenile) acquired from a fossil dealer who claimed all three had their provenance in a single quarry at Batu Yingzi in Liaoning Province, China. They were thus probably found in a layer of the Yixian Formation, dating from the Barremian, approximately 125 million years old. The specimens had been cut into pieces about the size of bath mats, which could be carried by two people.

The holotype, ZCDM V5000, is the largest specimen, consisting of a nearly complete skeleton with a skull, compressed on a slab, of an adult individual. The paratypes are the two other specimens: ZCDM V5001 consisting of a skeleton of a smaller individual and part of the same slab as the holotype; and ELDM V1001, a juvenile estimated to have been eight years younger than the holotype. The fossils are part of the collections of the Zhucheng Dinosaur Museum and the Erlianhaote Dinosaur Museum but have been prepared by the Institute of Vertebrate Paleontology and Paleoanthropology, under the guidance of Xu.

== Description ==
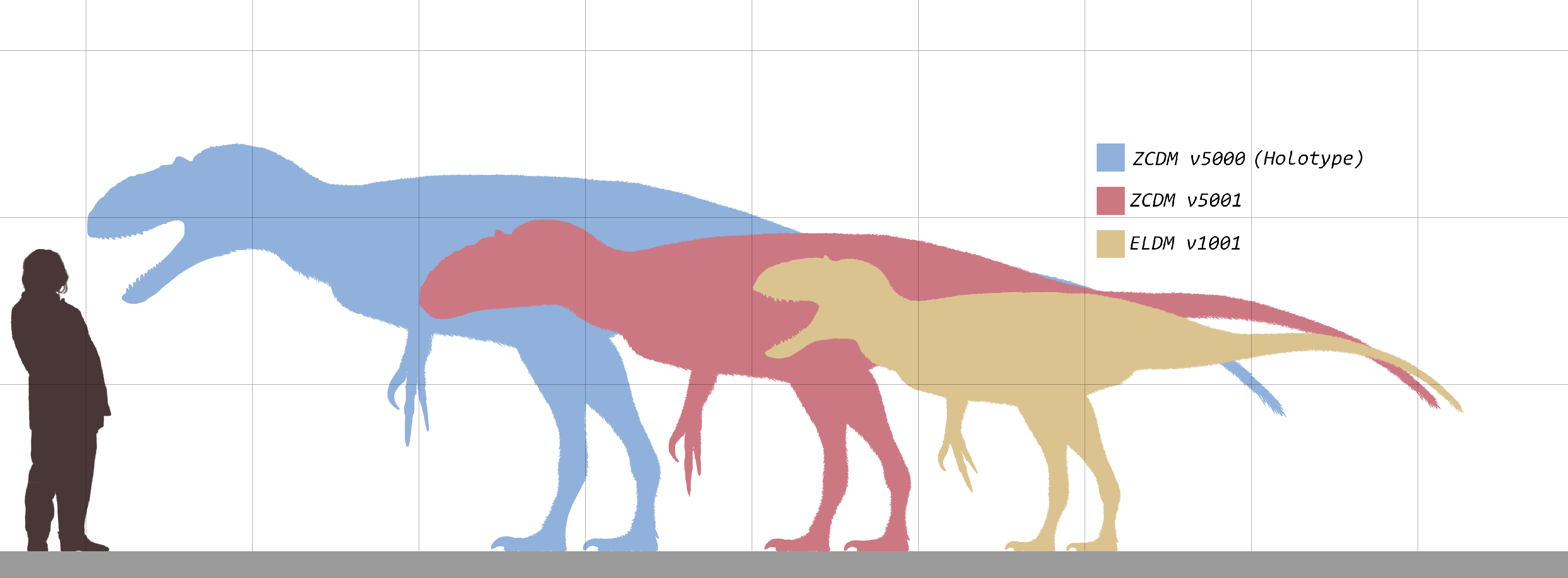
Size of three Yutyrannus specimens compared to a human

Yutyrannus was a large bipedal predator. The holotype and oldest-known specimen has an estimated length of 10 metres (32.8 ft) and an estimated weight of about 1,414 kilograms (3,117 lb). In 2016, Gregory S. Paul gave lower estimations of 7.5 metres (24.6 ft) and 1.1 tonnes (1.2 short tons). Its skull has an estimated length of 90.5 centimetres (35.6 in). The skulls of the paratypes are 80 centimetres (31 in) and 63 centimetres (25 in) long and their weights have been estimated at 596 kilograms (1,314 lb) and 493 kilograms (1,087 lb), respectively.

The describers established some diagnostic traits of Yutyrannus, in which it differs from its direct relatives. The snout features a high midline crest, formed by the nasals and the premaxillae and which is covered by large pneumatic recesses. The postorbital bone has a small secondary process, jutting into the upper hind corner of the eye socket. The outer side of the main body of the postorbital is hollowed out. In the lower jaw, the external mandibular fenestra, the main opening in the outer side, is mainly located in the surangular.

=== Feathers ===
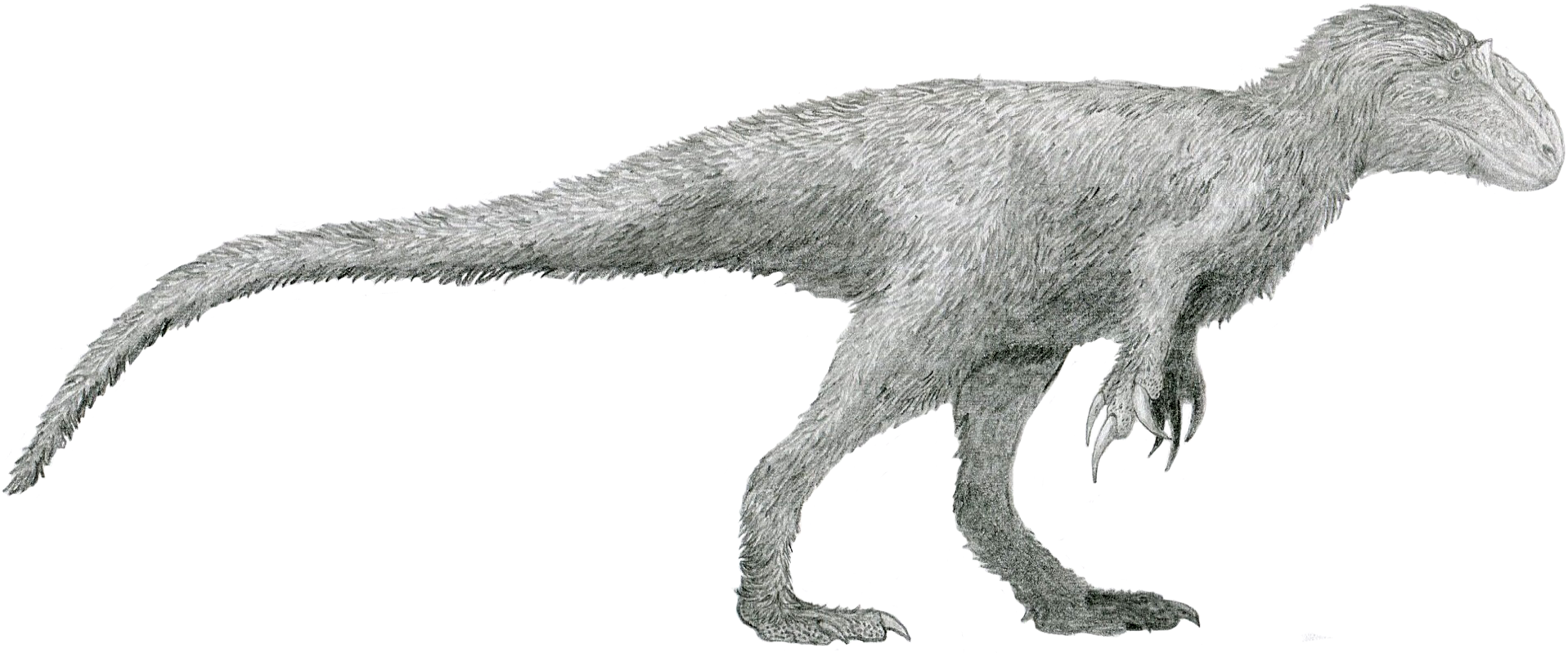
Artist's restoration based on ELDM V1001

The described specimens of Yutyrannus contain direct evidence of feathers in the form of fossil imprints. The feathers were long, up to 20 centimetres (7.9 in), and filamentous. Because the quality of the preservation was low, it could not be established whether the filaments were simple or compound, broad or narrow. The feathers covered various parts of the body. With the holotype they were present on the pelvis and near the foot. Specimen ZCDM V5000 had feathers on the tail pointing backwards under an angle of 30 degrees with the tail axis. The smallest specimen showed 20-centimetre-long (7.9 in) filaments on the neck and 16-centimetre-long (6.3 in) feathers at the upper arm. While it has been known since 2004, upon the description of Dilong, that at least some tyrannosauroids possessed filamentous "stage 1" feathers, according to the feather typology of Richard Prum, Y. huali is currently the largest-known species of dinosaur with direct evidence of feathers, forty times heavier than the previous record holder, Beipiaosaurus.

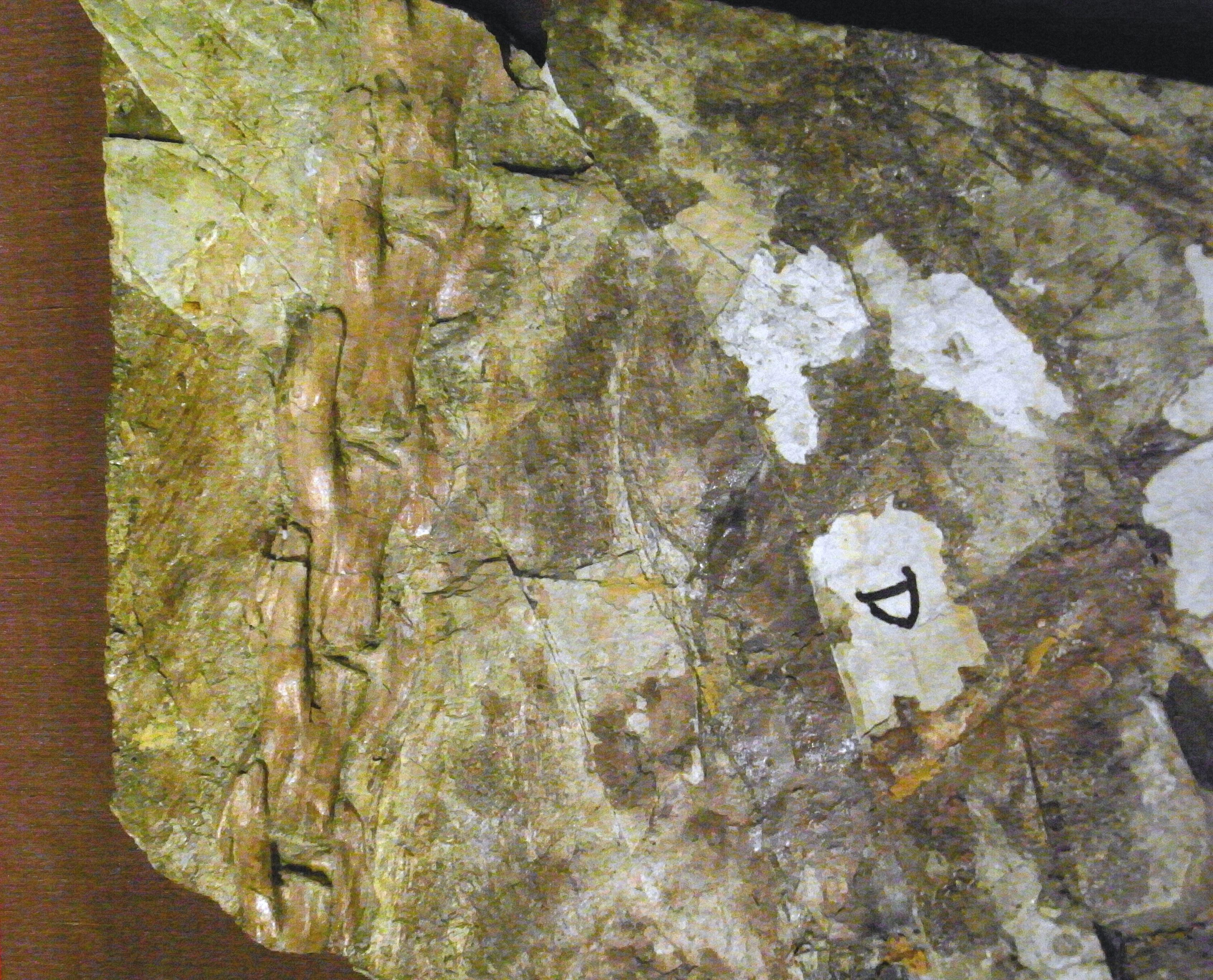
Tail fragment with feather traces

Based on the distribution of the feathers, they may have covered the whole body and served in regulating temperature, given the rather cold climate of the Yixian with an average annual temperature of 10 °C (50 °F). Alternatively, if they were restricted to the regions in which they were found, they may have served as display structures. In addition, the two adult specimens had distinctive, "wavy" crests on their snouts, on both sides of a high central crest, which were probably used for display. The presence of feathers on a large basal tyrannosauroid suggests the possibility that later tyrannosaurids were also feathered, even when adult, despite their size. However, scaly skin impressions have been reported from various Late Cretaceous tyrannosaurids (such as Gorgosaurus, Tarbosaurus and Tyrannosaurus) on parts of the body where Yutyrannus was feathered. Since there is no positive evidence for plumage in tyrannosaurids, some researchers have suggested they may have evolved scales secondarily. If scaly skin was the dominant epidermal trait of later genera, then the extent and nature of the integumentary covering may have changed over time in response to body size, a warmer climate, or other factors.

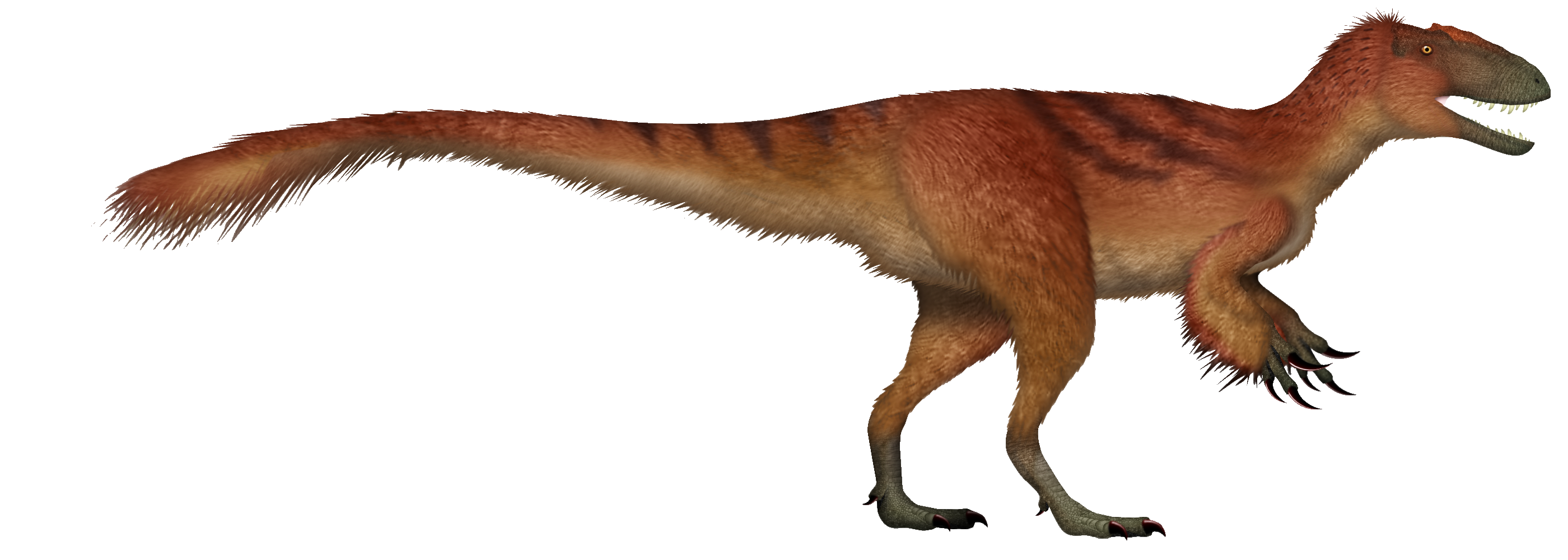
Another restoration

== Classification ==
To date, all phylogenetic analyses of Yutyrannus relationships have classified it in the group Tyrannosauroidea. An initial analysis of its relationship to other tyrannosauroids showed that it was more primitive than Eotyrannus in the evolutionary tree, but more advanced than tyrannosauroids such as Dilong, Guanlong and Sinotyrannus. Primitive traits relative to advanced tyrannosaurs included long forelimbs with three fingers and a short foot which was not specialized for running. Advanced traits included a large and deep skull, the outer side of the premaxilla having rotated upwards, a large cuneiform horn on the lacrimal in front of the eye socket, a postorbital process on the back rim of the eye socket, the squamosal and the quadratojugal forming a large process on the back rim of the infratemporal fenestra, short dorsal vertebrae, an ilium with a straight upper rim and an appending lobe, a large pubic foot and a slender ischium.

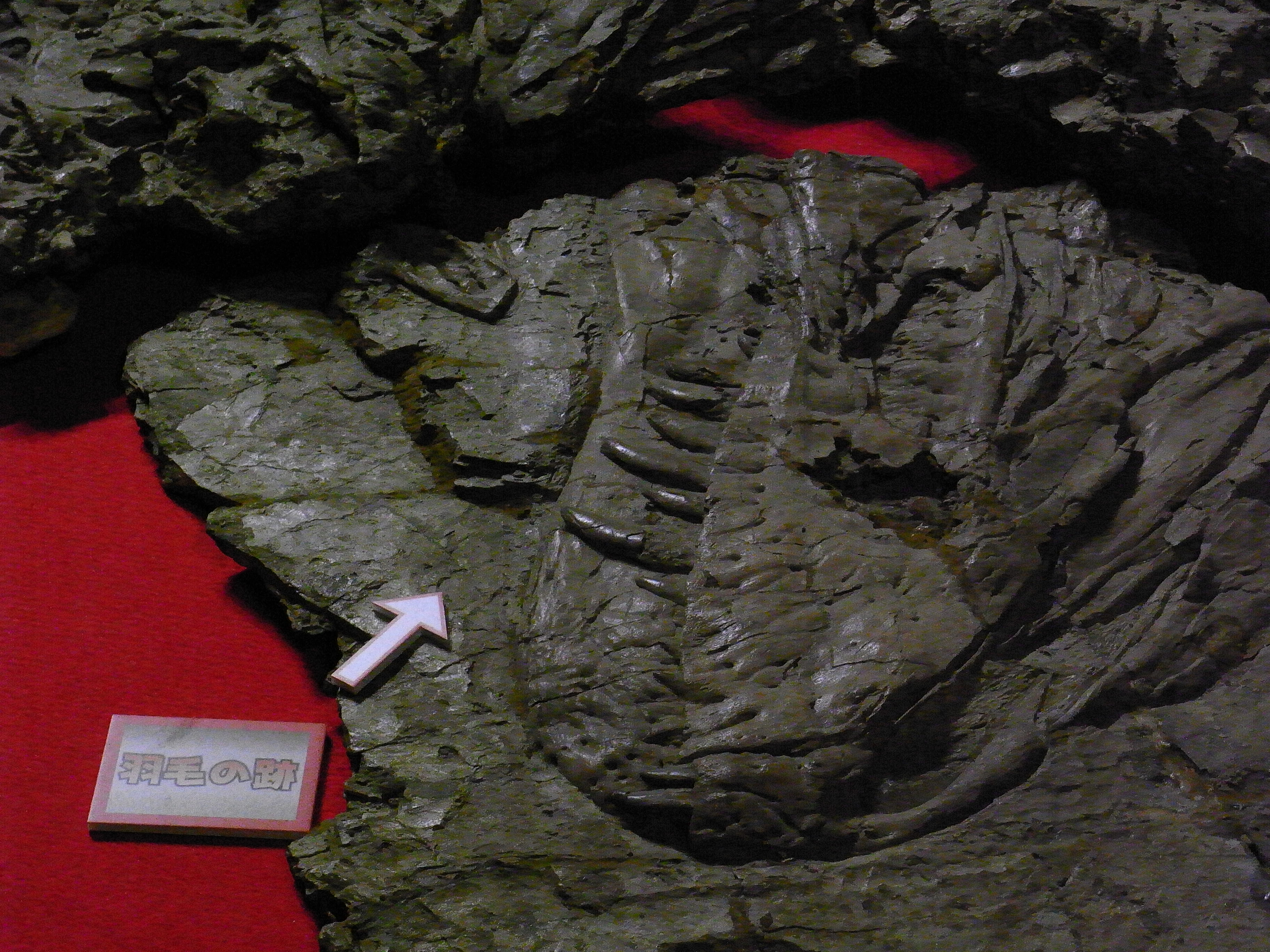
Close-up of snout

In 2016, a phylogenetic analysis conducted by Thomas Carr and Stephen Brusatte re-examined the evolutionary relationships of the Tyrannosauroidea. Their analysis found Yutyrannus to be more basal than Dilong, placing it within the family Proceratosauridae. Their cladogram is shown below:

- Proceratosauridae
  - Guanlong
  - - Proceratosaurus
    - - Kileskus
      - - Yutyrannus
        - Sinotyrannus

== Paleobiology ==
=== Ontogeny ===
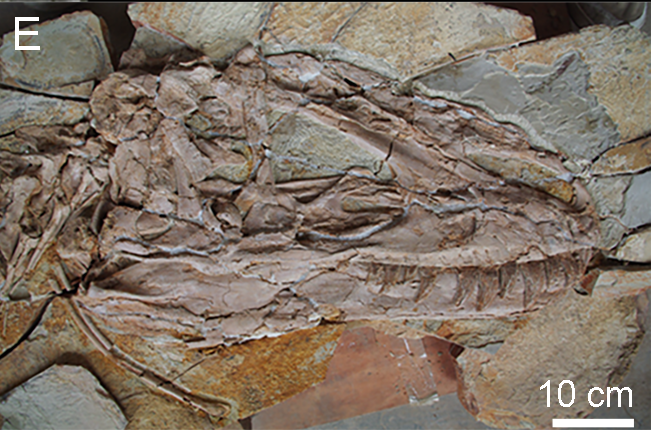
Skull of the juvenile specimen ELDM V1001

Skull reconstructions of all three Y. huali specimens with known or visible material in white.

The knowledge of specimens representing various different ages has allowed paleontologists to determine the ontogeny, or change during growth, of this species. During growth the lower legs, feet, ilia and forelimbs became relatively smaller. The skull, on the other hand, grew more robust and deeper.

=== Feeding ===
According to a 2018 study, Yutyrannus had a simple hyoid structure, indicating it had a flat tongue, like a crocodile. Based on hyoid bone comparisons between living and extinct archosaurs, it was determined that all archosaurs would have had fixed tongues, with the exception of birds, pterosaurs and certain ornithischians.

The bite force of Yutyrannus was estimated to be 2,405 N (540 lbf) according to a 2023 study that compared its bite force and that of other early tyrannosauroids to those of more advanced tyrannosaurids.

=== Social behavior ===
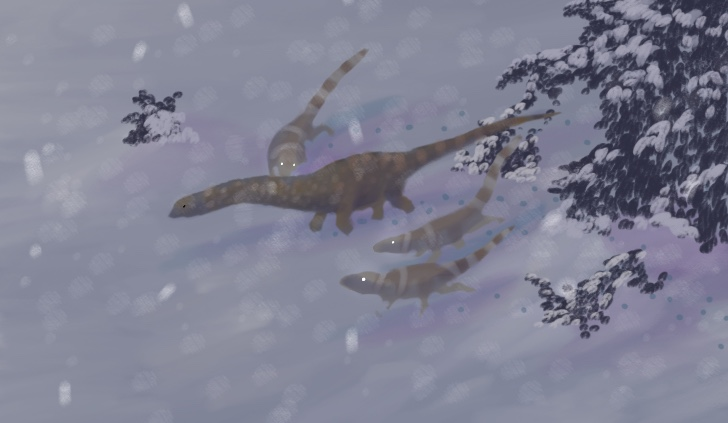
Illustration showing a pack of Yutyrannus hunting Dongbeititan

Because the three known individuals of Yutyrannus were allegedly found together, some paleontologists, including Xu Xing, have interpreted the animal as a pack hunter. Based on the presence of sauropod material in the quarry in which the three specimens were found, Xu has further speculated that Yutyrannus may have hunted sauropods, and that the three known individuals may have died while doing so. In addition, other sauropod hunting theropods such as Mapusaurus are known to have exhibited pack hunting behaviour. The true cause of their death, however, remains unknown.

== Paleoecology ==
Because the locality of Yutyrannus is uncertain, it is unknown what fauna it coexisted with. Age estimates point towards Yutyrannus originating from the Lujiatun or the Jianshangou beds of the Yixian, meaning it would have been contemporaneous of such dinosaurs as Psittacosaurus, Dongbeititan, Sinosauropteryx, and Caudipteryx. Fish such as Lycoptera would also have been prevalent. Volcanic eruptions and forest fires appear to have been common in the Yixian, and the environment would have had numerous bodies of water and coniferous plants. The environment would have been comparable to the modern day temperate rainforests of British Columbia, and would have experienced significant seasonal changes in temperature. It was likely an apex predator.

== See also ==
- Timeline of tyrannosaur research
