= BBC Earth =

Brand of natural history television programming distributed by BBC Studios

Current BBC Earth logo

BBC Earth is a brand used by BBC Studios since 2009 to market and distribute the BBC's natural history content to countries other than the United Kingdom. BBC Studios is the commercial arm of the public service broadcaster.

BBC Earth commercially represents the BBC Studios Natural History Unit, the largest wildlife documentary production house in the world, and the BBC Studios Science Unit. It is part of British Broadcasting Corporation. BBC Earth is responsible for the worldwide marketing and distribution of titles such as Planet Earth, Frozen Planet, Life, The Blue Planet, and Planet Earth II. It has generated sales to over 180 countries.

The BBC Earth brand is used across a range of media platforms, including concert-style documentary viewings with a live orchestra and interactive experiences at museums and theme parks. Its website was relaunched in 2010 incorporating a new consumer-facing site "Life Is" which features a bi-monthly magazine style update and a blog. The brand is also used for new releases of BBC natural history titles on DVD and Blu-ray.

== BBC Earth Films ==
Former BBC Earth logo

In 2010, the brand launched BBC Earth Films, the theatrical arm of BBC Earth. Three new productions were announced at the launch: One Life (2011), Walking with Dinosaurs 3D (2013) and Enchanted Kingdom 3D (2014). In September 2012, BBC Earth Films announced a further three projects, a trio of 3D documentaries produced in collaboration with Giant Screen Films. Amazing Bugs! 3D, Africa: The Wildest Place on Earth 3D and Sharks! Rulers of the Seas 3D will be developed for theatres, museums and visitor attractions. In 2014, Walking with Dinosaurs 3D was rereleased under the title Walking with Dinosaurs: Prehistoric Planet 3D.

== Orbi ==
In 2013, BBC Earth and Sega opened a theme park called Orbi in Yokohama, Japan. The park contains 12 attractions and a 23.4 degree theatre.
