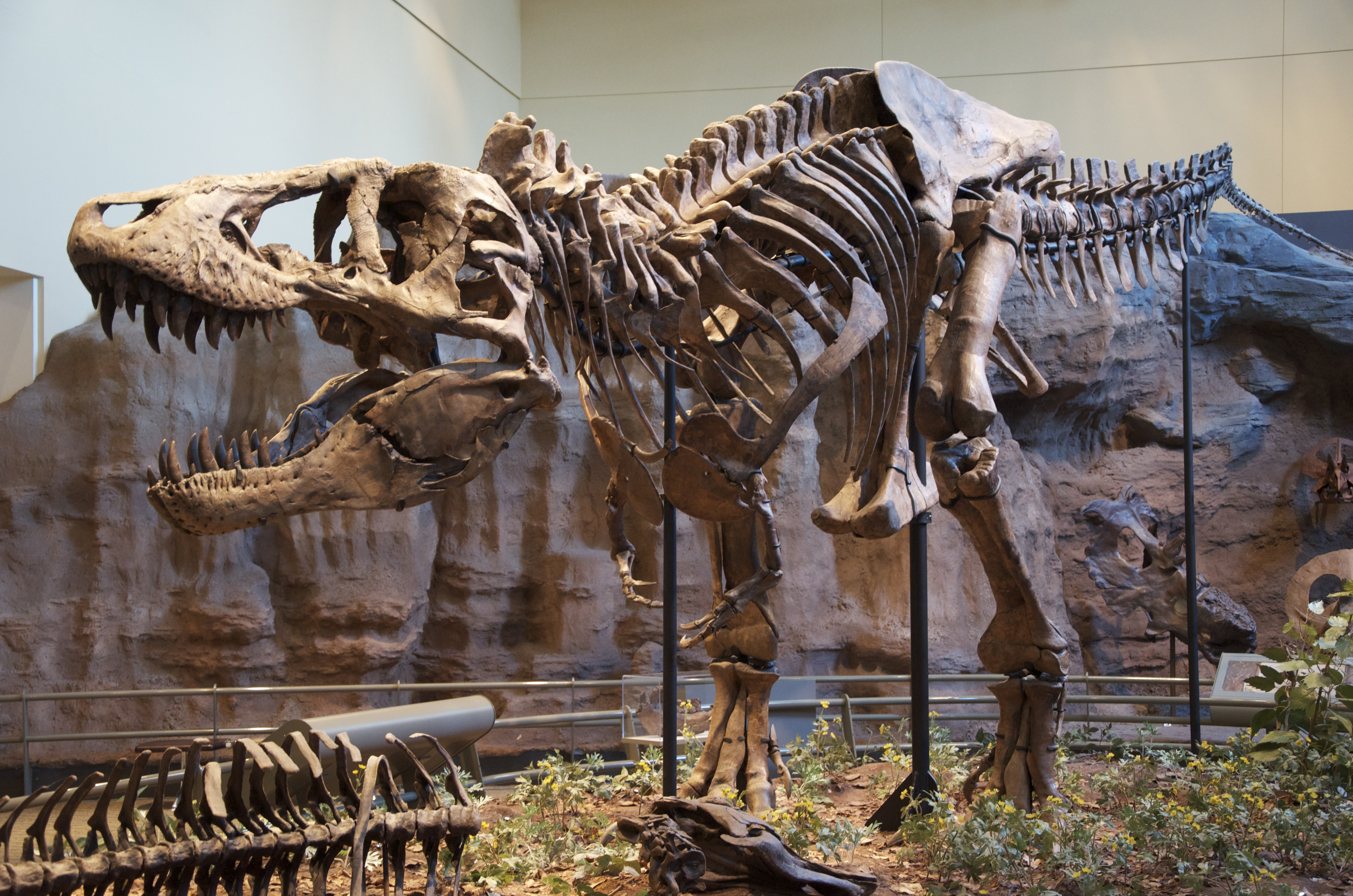
- Reconstruction of the T. rex type specimen at the Carnegie Museum of Natural History

Scientific classification
- Kingdom: Animalia
- Phylum: Chordata
- Class: Reptilia
- Clade: Dinosauria
- Clade: Saurischia
- Clade: Theropoda
- Superfamily: †Tyrannosauroidea
- Family: †Tyrannosauridae
- Tribe: †Tyrannosaurini
- Genus: †Tyrannosaurus; Osborn, 1905

Type species
- †Tyrannosaurus rex Osborn, 1905

Other species
- †T. mcraeensis? Dalman et al., 2024; See text

Synonyms
- Genus synonymy: Dinotyrannus Olshevsky, Ford & Yamamoto, 1995; Dynamosaurus Osborn, 1905; Manospondylus Cope, 1892; Stygivenator? Olshevsky, Ford & Yamamoto, 1995; Species synonymy: Aublysodon amplus? Marsh, 1892; Deinodon amplus? (Marsh, 1892) Hay, 1902; Manospondylus amplus? (Marsh, 1892) Olshevsky, 1978; Stygivenator amplus? (Marsh, 1892) Olshevsky, Ford & Yamamoto, 1995; Tyrannosaurus amplus? (Marsh, 1892) Hay, 1930; Aublysodon cristatus? Marsh, 1892; Deinodon cristatus? (Marsh, 1892) Hay, 1902; Stygivenator cristatus? (Marsh, 1892) Olshevsky, Ford & Yamamoto, 1995; Ornithomimus grandis Marsh, 1890; Manospondylus gigas Cope, 1892; Dynamosaurus imperiosus Osborn, 1905; Tyrannosaurus imperiosus (Osborn, 1905) Walker, 1964; Tyrannosaurus "vannus" Lawson, 1972 (nomen nudum); Albertosaurus "megagracilis" Paul, 1988a (nomen nudum); Tyrannosaurus "gigantus" Harlan, 1990 (nomen nudum); Dinotyrannus megagracilis Olshevsky, Ford & Yamamoto, 1995; Tyrannosaurus "stanwinstonorum" Pickering, 1995 (nomen nudum); Tyrannosaurus "stanwinstonorus" Pickering, 1995 (nomen nudum); Aublysodon molnaris? Paul, 1988a; Aublysodon molnari? Paul, 1988a emend Paul, 1989; Stygivenator molnari? (Paul, 1988a emend Paul, 1989) Olshevsky, Ford & Yamamoto, 1995

= Tyrannosaurus =

Tyrannosaurus Temporal range: Late Cretaceous (late Maastrichtian), 69.4–66 Ma Possible middle Campanian record

Genus of Late Cretaceous theropod

Tyrannosaurus (/tɪˌrænəˈsɔːrəs, taɪ-/) (Note: lit. 'tyrant lizard'; from Ancient Greek τύραννος (túrannos) 'tyrant' and σαῦρος (saûros) 'lizard') is a genus of large theropod dinosaur. The type species Tyrannosaurus rex (rex meaning 'king' in Latin), often shortened to T. rex or colloquially T-Rex, (Note: Also stylized as T-rex) is one of the best represented theropods. It lived throughout what is now western North America, on what was then an island continent known as Laramidia. Tyrannosaurus had a much wider range than other tyrannosaurids. Fossils are found in geological formations which have been dated to the late Maastrichtian age of the late Cretaceous period, 69.4 to 66 million years ago, with isolated specimens possibly indicating an earlier origin in the middle Campanian age. It was one of the last known members of the tyrannosaurids and among the last non-avian dinosaurs to exist before the Cretaceous–Paleogene extinction event.

Like other tyrannosaurids, Tyrannosaurus was a bipedal carnivore with a massive skull balanced by a long, heavy tail. Relative to its large and powerful hind limbs, the forelimbs of Tyrannosaurus were short but unusually powerful for their size, and they had two clawed digits. The most complete specimen measures 12.3–12.4 m (40–41 ft) in length, but according to most modern estimates, Tyrannosaurus could have exceeded sizes of 13 m (43 ft) in length, 3.7–4 m (12–13 ft) in hip height, and 8.8 t (8.7 long tons; 9.7 short tons) in mass. Although some other theropods might have rivaled or exceeded Tyrannosaurus in size, it is still among the largest known land predators, with its estimated bite force being the largest among all terrestrial animals. By far the largest carnivore in its environment, Tyrannosaurus rex was most likely an apex predator, preying upon hadrosaurs, juvenile armored herbivores like ceratopsians and ankylosaurs, and possibly sauropods. The question of whether Tyrannosaurus was an apex predator or a pure scavenger was among the longest debates in paleontology. Most paleontologists today accept that Tyrannosaurus was a predator, and the idea of Tyrannosaurus being primarily a scavenger has been discredited.

Some specimens of Tyrannosaurus rex are nearly complete skeletons. Soft tissue and proteins have been reported in at least one of these specimens. The abundance of fossil material has allowed significant research into many aspects of the animal's biology, including its life history and biomechanics. The feeding habits, physiology, and potential speed of Tyrannosaurus rex are a few subjects of debate. Its taxonomy is also controversial. The Asian Tarbosaurus bataar is very closely related to Tyrannosaurus and has sometimes been seen as a species of this genus. Several North American tyrannosaurids have been synonymized with Tyrannosaurus, while some Tyrannosaurus specimens have been proposed as distinct species. The validity of these species, such as the more recently discovered T. mcraeensis, is contentious.

Tyrannosaurus has been one of the best-known dinosaurs since the early 20th century. Its fossils have been a popular attraction in museums and it has appeared in media like Jurassic Park.

== History of research ==
=== Earliest finds ===
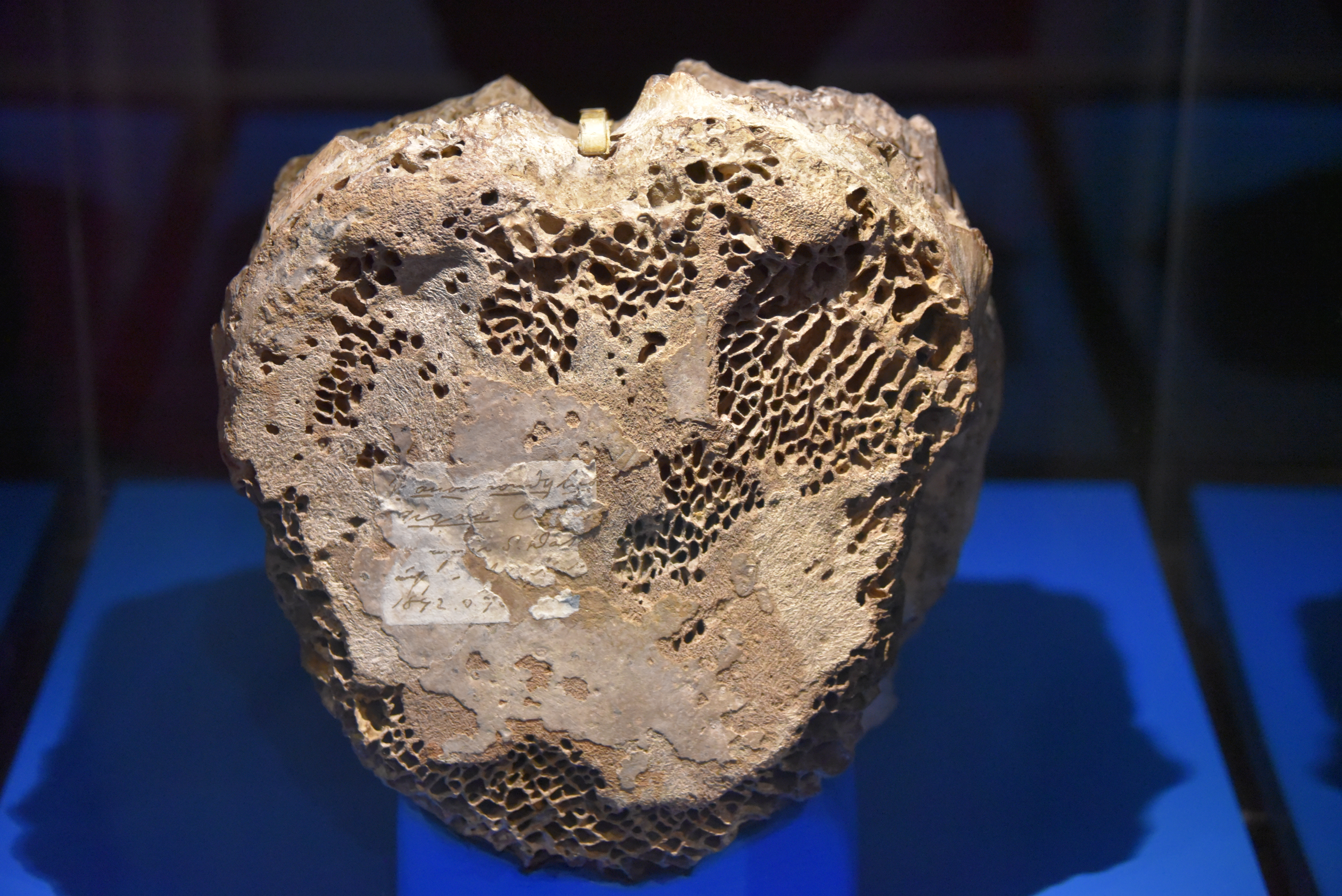
Type specimen (AMNH 3982) of Manospondylus gigas

A tooth from what is now documented as a Tyrannosaurus rex was found in July 1874 upon South Table Mountain (Colorado) by Jarvis Hall student Peter T. Dotson under the auspices of Arthur Lakes near Golden, Colorado, in sediments belonging to the Denver Formation. In the early 1890s, John Bell Hatcher collected postcranial elements in eastern Wyoming. The fossils were believed to be from the large species Ornithomimus grandis (now Deinodon) but are now considered T. rex remains.

In 1892, Edward Drinker Cope found two vertebral fragments of a large dinosaur. Cope believed the fragments belonged to an "agathaumid" (ceratopsid) dinosaur, and named them Manospondylus gigas, meaning "giant porous vertebra", in reference to the numerous openings for blood vessels he found in the bone. The M. gigas remains were, in 1907, identified by Hatcher as those of a theropod rather than a ceratopsid.

Henry Fairfield Osborn recognized the similarity between Manospondylus gigas and T. rex as early as 1917, by which time the second vertebra had been lost. Owing to the fragmentary nature of the Manospondylus vertebrae, Osborn did not synonymize the two genera, instead considering the older genus indeterminate. In June 2000, the Black Hills Institute (BHI) found around 10% of a Tyrannosaurus skeleton (BHI 6248) at a site that might have been the original M. gigas locality. While Larson initially considered this specimen as the same animal as the M. gigas holotype and suggested that it would take priority over T. rex, other researchers including Christopher Brochu remained skeptical that the name T. rex would be abandoned. In 2003, Brochu further argued that although both taxa probably represent the same species, it is impossible to demonstrate that the specimen discovered by the Black Hills Institute represents the same animal as M. gigas due to the poor preservation of the M. gigas holotype; additionally, following the 2000 International Code of Zoological Nomenclature amendment, a name in popular usage like T. rex has priority over a name with technical priority but not used as a valid name in formal literature after the year 1899 for over fifty years like M. gigas.

=== Skeleton discovery and naming ===
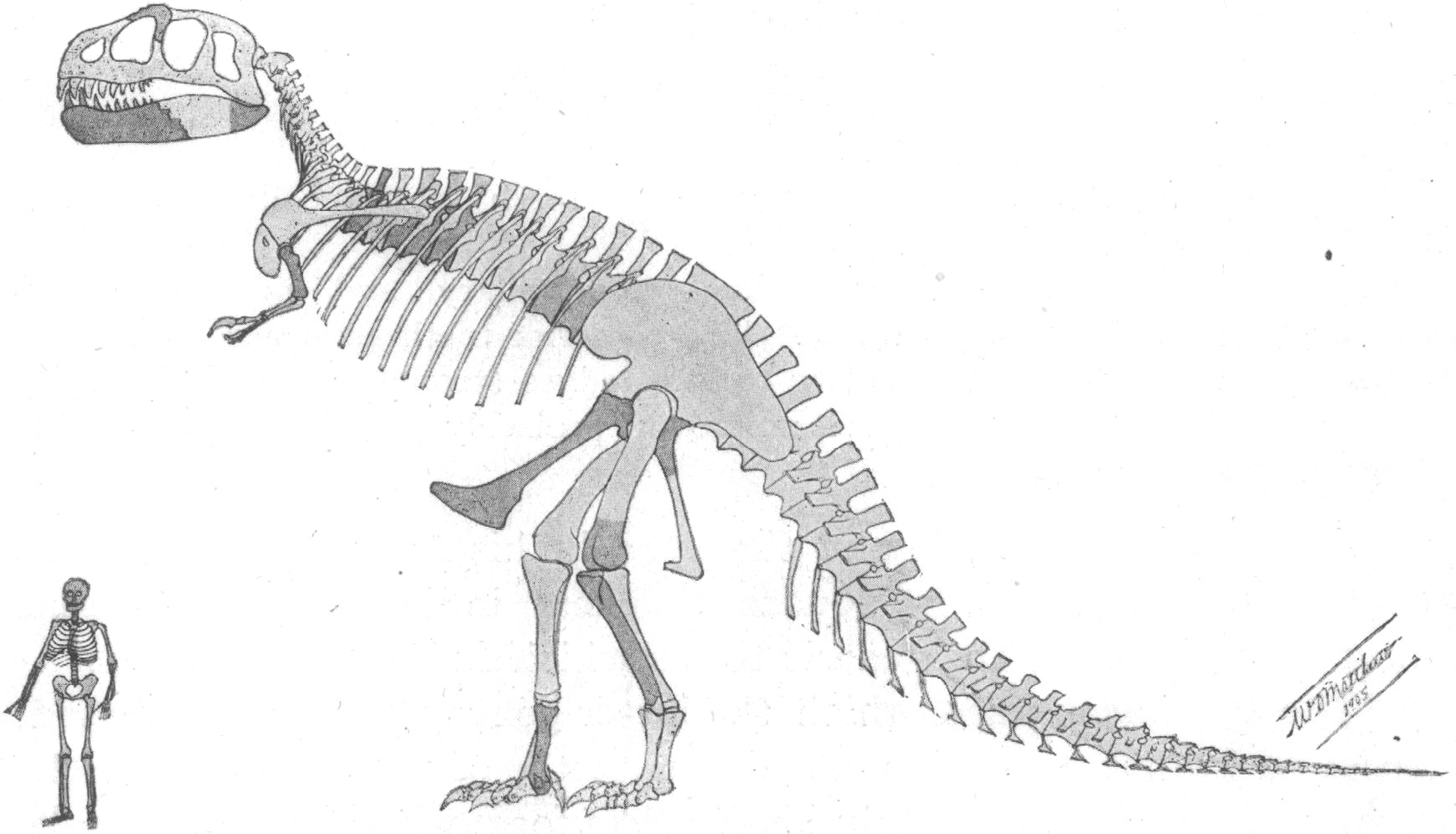
Outdated skeletal restoration by William D. Matthew from 1905, published alongside Osborn's description paper

Barnum Brown, assistant curator of the American Museum of Natural History, found the first partial skeleton of T. rex in eastern Wyoming in 1900. Brown found another partial skeleton in the Hell Creek Formation in Montana in 1902, comprising approximately 34 fossilized bones. Writing at the time Brown said "Quarry No. 1 contains the femur, pubes, humerus, three vertebrae and two undetermined bones of a large Carnivorous Dinosaur not described by Marsh. ... I have never seen anything like it from the Cretaceous." Henry Fairfield Osborn, president of the American Museum of Natural History, named the second skeleton T. rex in 1905. The generic name is derived from the Greek words τύραννος (tyrannos, meaning "tyrant") and σαῦρος (sauros, meaning "lizard"). Osborn used the Latin word rex, meaning "king", for the specific name. The full binomial translates to "tyrant lizard the king" or "King Tyrant Lizard", emphasizing the animal's size and presumed dominance over other species of the time.

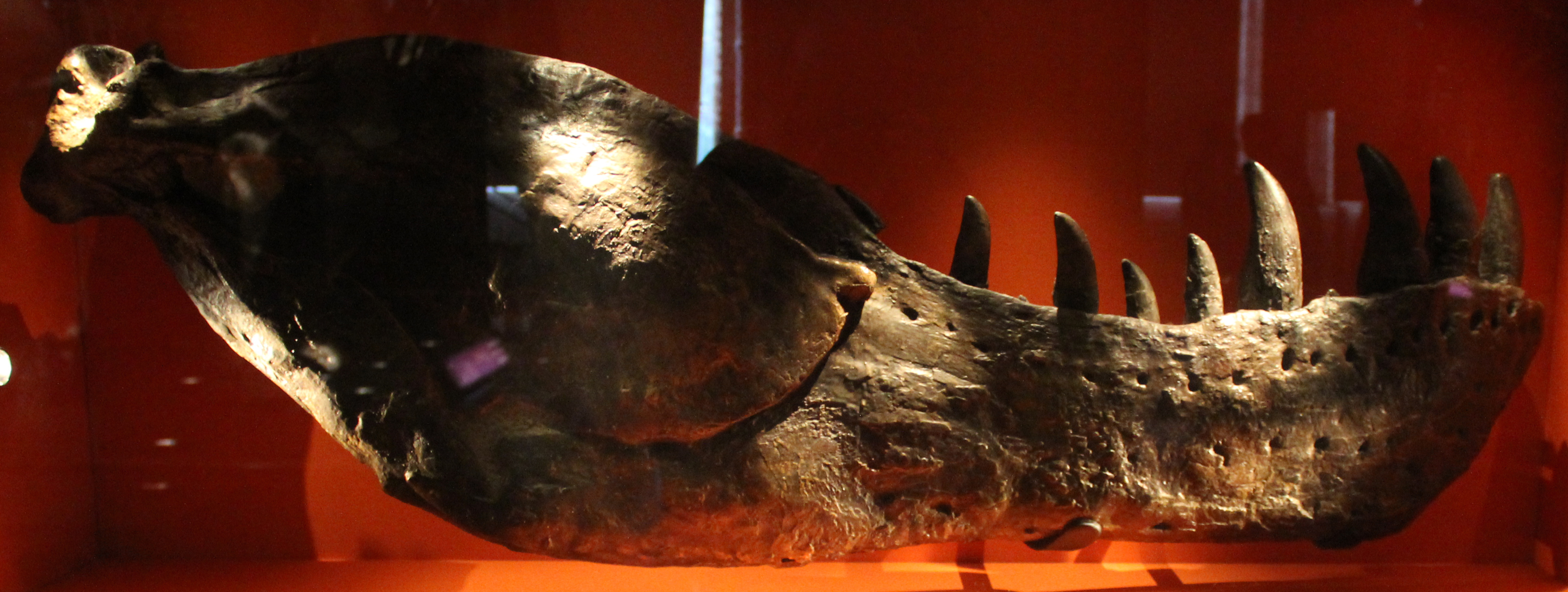
Dynamosaurus imperiosus holotype (NHMUK PV R8020, previously AMNH 5886) on display at the Natural History Museum, London

Osborn named the other specimen Dynamosaurus imperiosus in a 1905 paper. In 1906, Osborn recognized that the two skeletons were from the same species and selected Tyrannosaurus as the preferred name. In 1941, the T. rex type specimen was sold to the Carnegie Museum of Natural History in Pittsburgh, Pennsylvania, for $7,000 (equivalent to $153,224 in 2025). The original Dynamosaurus material now resides in the collections of the Natural History Museum, London.

From the 1910s through the end of the 1950s, Barnum's discoveries remained the only specimens of Tyrannosaurus, as the Great Depression and wars kept many paleontologists out of the field.

=== Continued study ===
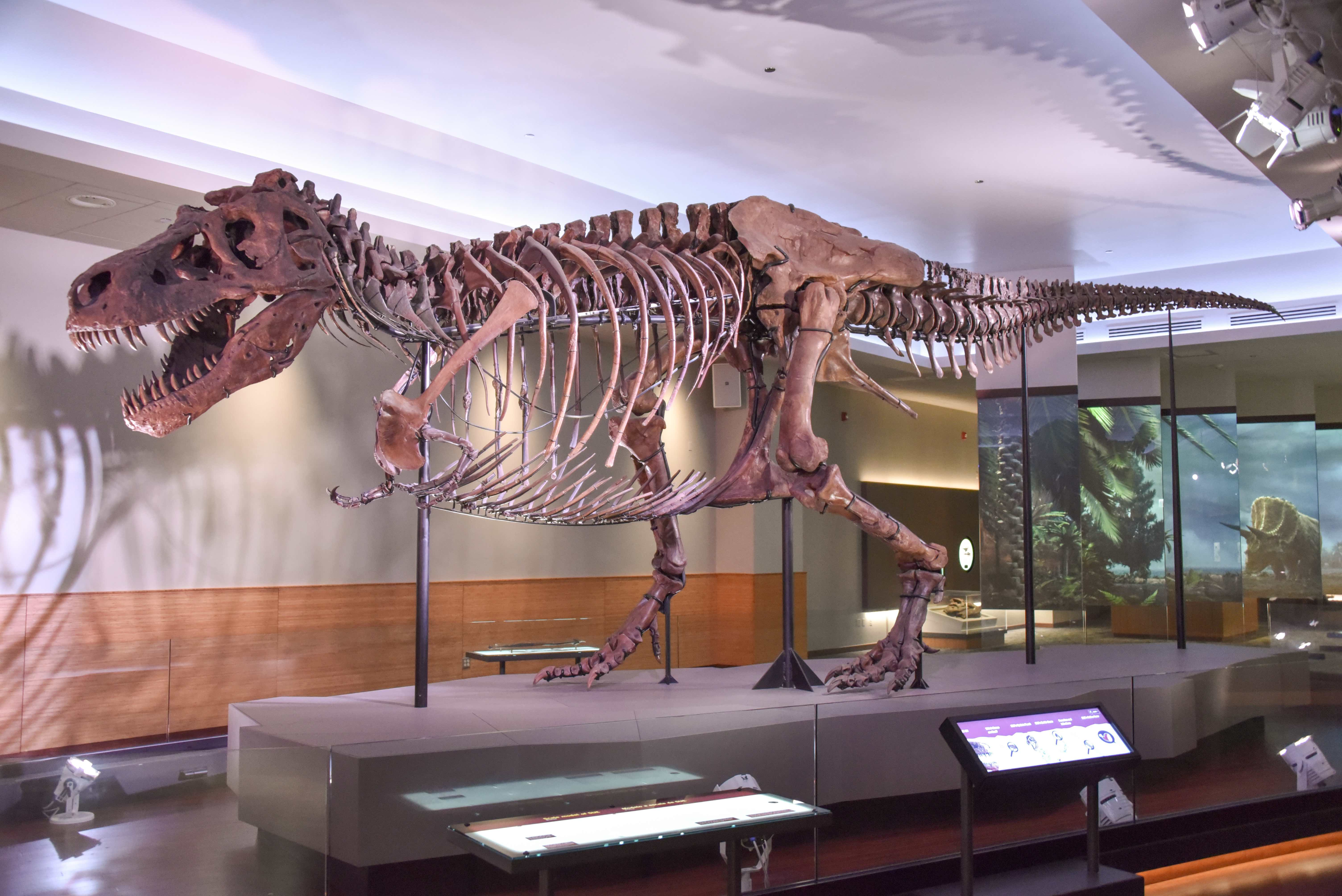
Specimen "Sue", Field Museum of Natural History, Chicago (with some bones reconstructed)

Beginning in the 1960s, there was renewed interest in Tyrannosaurus, resulting in the recovery of 42 skeletons (5–80% complete by bone count) from western North America. In 1967, Dr. William MacMannis located and recovered the skeleton named "MOR 008", which is 15% complete by bone count and has a reconstructed skull displayed at the Museum of the Rockies. The 1990s saw numerous discoveries, with nearly twice as many finds as in all previous years, including two of the most complete skeletons found to date: Sue and Stan.

Sue Hendrickson discovered the most complete (approximately 85%) and largest Tyrannosaurus skeleton in the Hell Creek Formation on August 12, 1990. The specimen Sue, named after the discoverer, was the object of a legal battle over its ownership. In 1997, the litigation was settled in favor of Maurice Williams, the original land owner. The fossil collection was purchased by the Field Museum of Natural History at auction for $7.6 million, making it the most expensive dinosaur skeleton until the sale of Stan for $31.8 million in 2020. The mounted skeleton opened to the public on May 17, 2000. A study of this specimen's fossilized bones showed that Sue reached full size at age 19 and died at the age of 28, the longest estimated life of any tyrannosaur known.

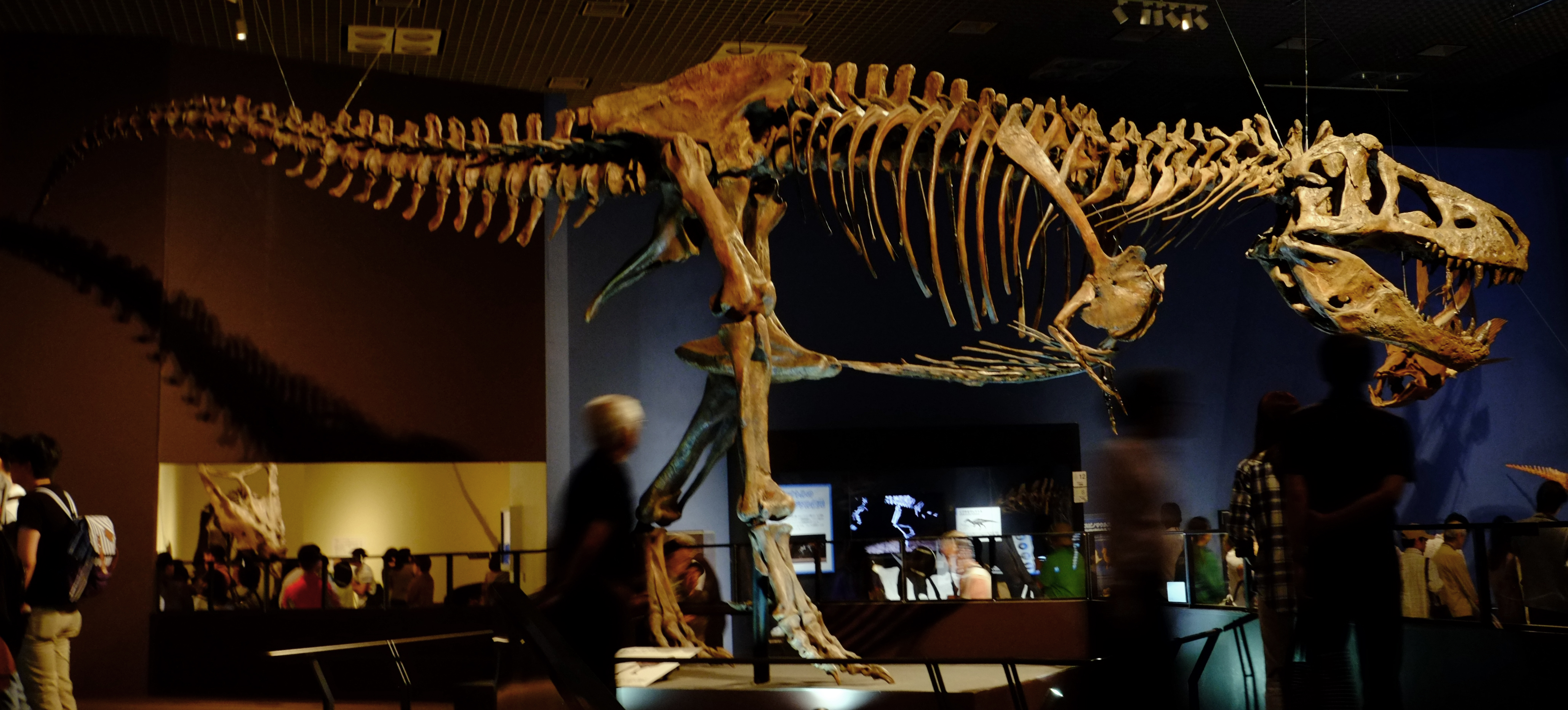
Replica of "Scotty", the largest known specimen, exhibited in Japan

Another Tyrannosaurus, nicknamed Stan (NHMAD 2020.00001, formerly BHI 3033), in honor of amateur paleontologist Stan Sacrison, was recovered from the Hell Creek Formation in 1992. Stan is the second most complete skeleton found, with 199 bones recovered representing 70% of the total. This tyrannosaur also had many bone pathologies, including broken and healed ribs, a broken and healed neck, and a substantial hole in the back of its head, about the size of a Tyrannosaurus tooth.

In 1998, 20-year-old Bucky Derflinger noticed a T. rex toe exposed above ground, making him the youngest person to discover a Tyrannosaurus. The specimen, dubbed Bucky in honor of its discoverer, was a young adult, 3.0 metres (10 ft) tall and 11 metres (35 ft) long. Bucky is the first Tyrannosaurus to be found that preserved a furcula (wishbone). Bucky is permanently displayed at The Children's Museum of Indianapolis.

The specimens "Sue", AMNH 5027, "Stan", and "Jane", to scale with a human.

In 2000, crews organized by Jack Horner discovered five Tyrannosaurus skeletons near the Fort Peck Reservoir. In 2001, a 50% complete skeleton of a juvenile Tyrannosaurus was discovered in the Hell Creek Formation by a crew from the Burpee Museum of Natural History. Dubbed Jane (BMRP 2002.4.1), the find was thought to be the first known skeleton of a pygmy tyrannosaurid, Nanotyrannus, but other researchers considered it as the most complete juvenile T. rex; currently exhibited at the Burpee Museum of Natural History, Jane is now re-described as the holotype of N. lethaeus. In 2002, a skeleton nicknamed "Wyrex", discovered by amateur collectors Dan Wells and Don Wyrick, had 114 bones and was 38% complete. The dig was concluded in 2004 by the Black Hills Institute with the first live online Tyrannosaurus excavation.

In 2006, Montana State University revealed that it possessed the largest Tyrannosaurus skull yet discovered (from a specimen named MOR 008), measuring 5 feet (152 cm) long. Subsequent comparisons indicated that the longest head was 136.5 centimetres (53.7 in) (from specimen LACM 23844) and the widest head was 90.2 centimetres (35.5 in) (from Sue).

== Description ==
=== Size ===
Size (in blue) compared to select giant theropods and a human

T. rex was one of the largest land carnivores of all time. One of its largest and the most complete specimens, Sue (FMNH PR2081), measured 12.3–12.8 m (40–42 ft) long, was 3.66–3.96 m (12.0–13.0 ft) tall at the hips, and according to the most recent studies, using a variety of techniques, maximum body masses have been estimated approximately 8.4–9.22 t (8.27–9.07 long tons; 9.26–10.16 short tons). A specimen nicknamed Scotty (RSM P2523.8), located at the Royal Saskatchewan Museum, is reported to measure 13 m (43 ft) in length. Using a mass estimation technique that extrapolates from the circumference of the femur, Scotty was estimated as the largest known specimen at 8.87 t (8.73 long tons; 9.78 short tons) in body mass.

Not every adult Tyrannosaurus specimen recovered is as big. Historically average adult mass estimates have varied widely over the years, from as low as 4.5 t (4.4 long tons; 5.0 short tons), to more than 7.2 t (7.1 long tons; 7.9 short tons), with most modern estimates ranging between 5.4 and 8.0 t (5.3 and 7.9 long tons; 6.0 and 8.8 short tons).

A 2024 study found that there was little evidence of size-based sexual dimorphism in T. rex.

=== Skull ===
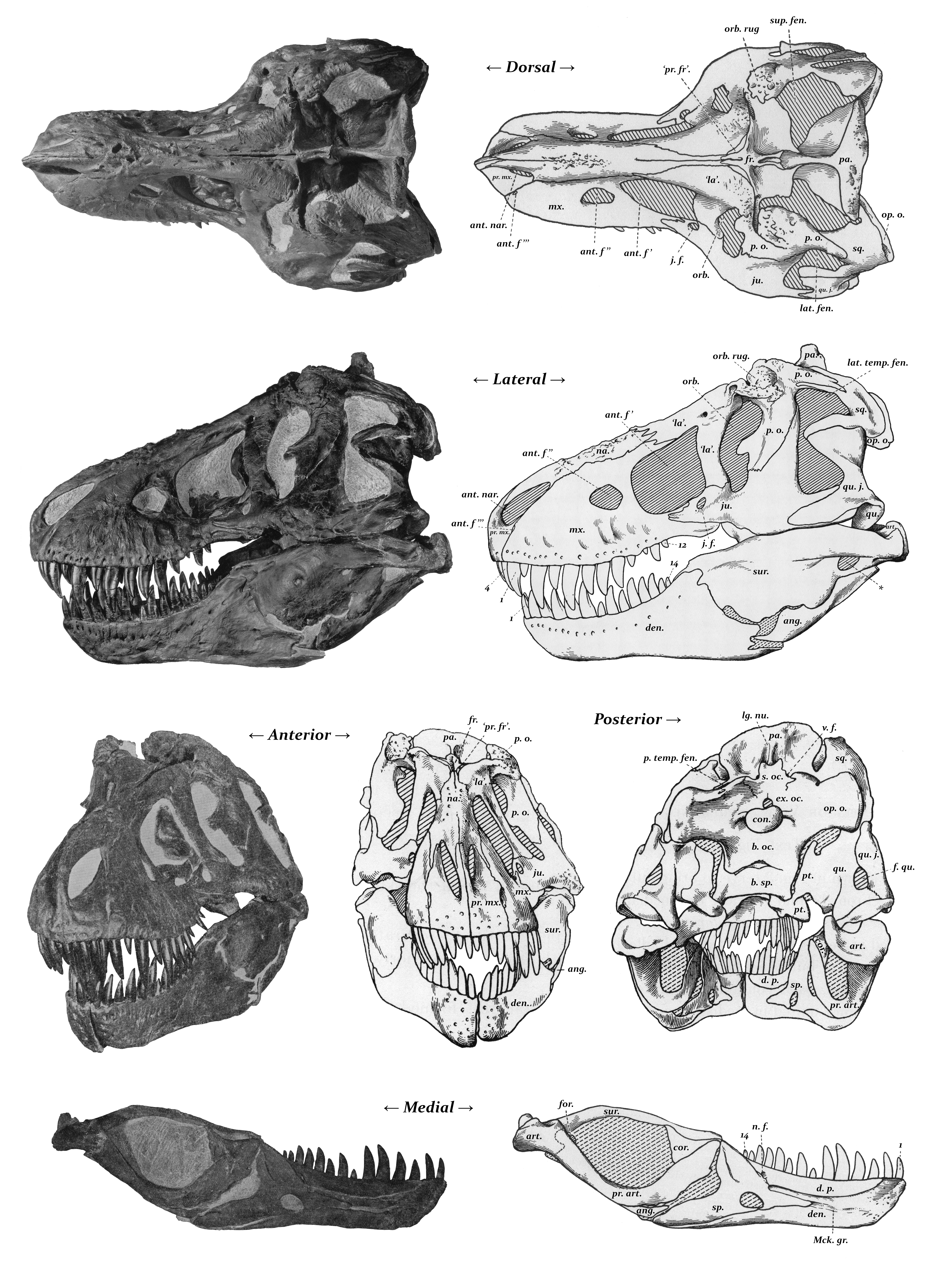
Skull of specimen AMNH 5027 with labelled diagrams in dorsal, lateral, anterior, posterior, and medial (lower jaw) views

The largest known T. rex skulls measure up to 1.52 m (5 ft 0 in) in length. Large fenestrae (openings) in the skull reduced weight, as in all carnivorous theropods. In other respects Tyrannosaurus's skull was significantly different from those of large non-tyrannosaurid theropods. It was extremely wide at the rear but had a narrow snout, allowing unusually good binocular vision. The skull bones were massive and the nasals and some other bones were fused, preventing movement between them; but many were pneumatized (contained a "honeycomb" of tiny air spaces) and thus lighter. These and other skull-strengthening features are part of the tyrannosaurid trend towards an increasingly powerful bite, which easily surpassed that of all non-tyrannosaurids. The tip of the upper jaw was U-shaped (most non-tyrannosauroid carnivores had V-shaped upper jaws), which increased the amount of tissue and bone a tyrannosaur could rip out with one bite, although it also increased the stresses on the front teeth.

The teeth of T. rex displayed marked heterodonty (differences in shape). The premaxillary teeth, four per side at the front of the upper jaw, were closely packed, D-shaped in cross-section, had reinforcing ridges on the rear surface, were incisiform (their tips were chisel-like blades) and curved backwards. The D-shaped cross-section, reinforcing ridges and backwards curve reduced the risk that the teeth would snap when Tyrannosaurus bit and pulled. The remaining teeth were robust, like "lethal bananas" rather than daggers, more widely spaced and also had reinforcing ridges. Those in the upper jaw, twelve per side in mature individuals, were larger than their counterparts of the lower jaw, except at the rear. The largest found so far is estimated to have been 30.5 cm (12.0 in) long including the root when the animal was alive, making it the largest tooth of any carnivorous dinosaur yet found. The lower jaw was robust. Its front dentary bone bore thirteen teeth. Behind the tooth row, the lower jaw became notably taller. The upper and lower jaws of Tyrannosaurus, like those of many dinosaurs, possessed numerous foramina, or small holes in the bone. Various functions have been proposed for these foramina, such as a crocodile-like sensory system or evidence of extra-oral structures such as scales or potentially lips, with subsequent research on theropod tooth wear patterns supporting such a proposition.

=== Skeleton ===
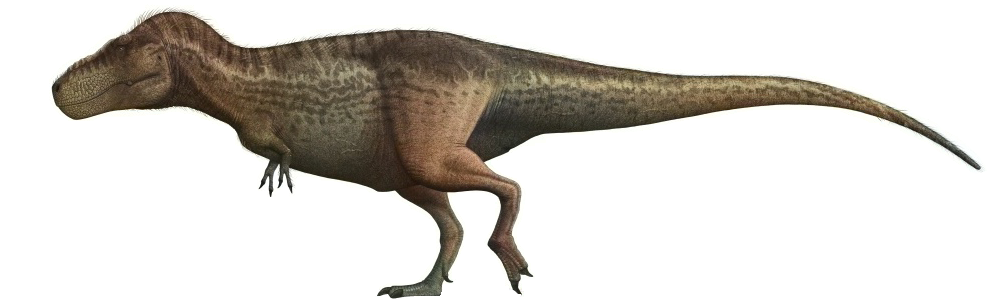
Life restoration showing scaly skin with sparse feathering, and lipped jaws

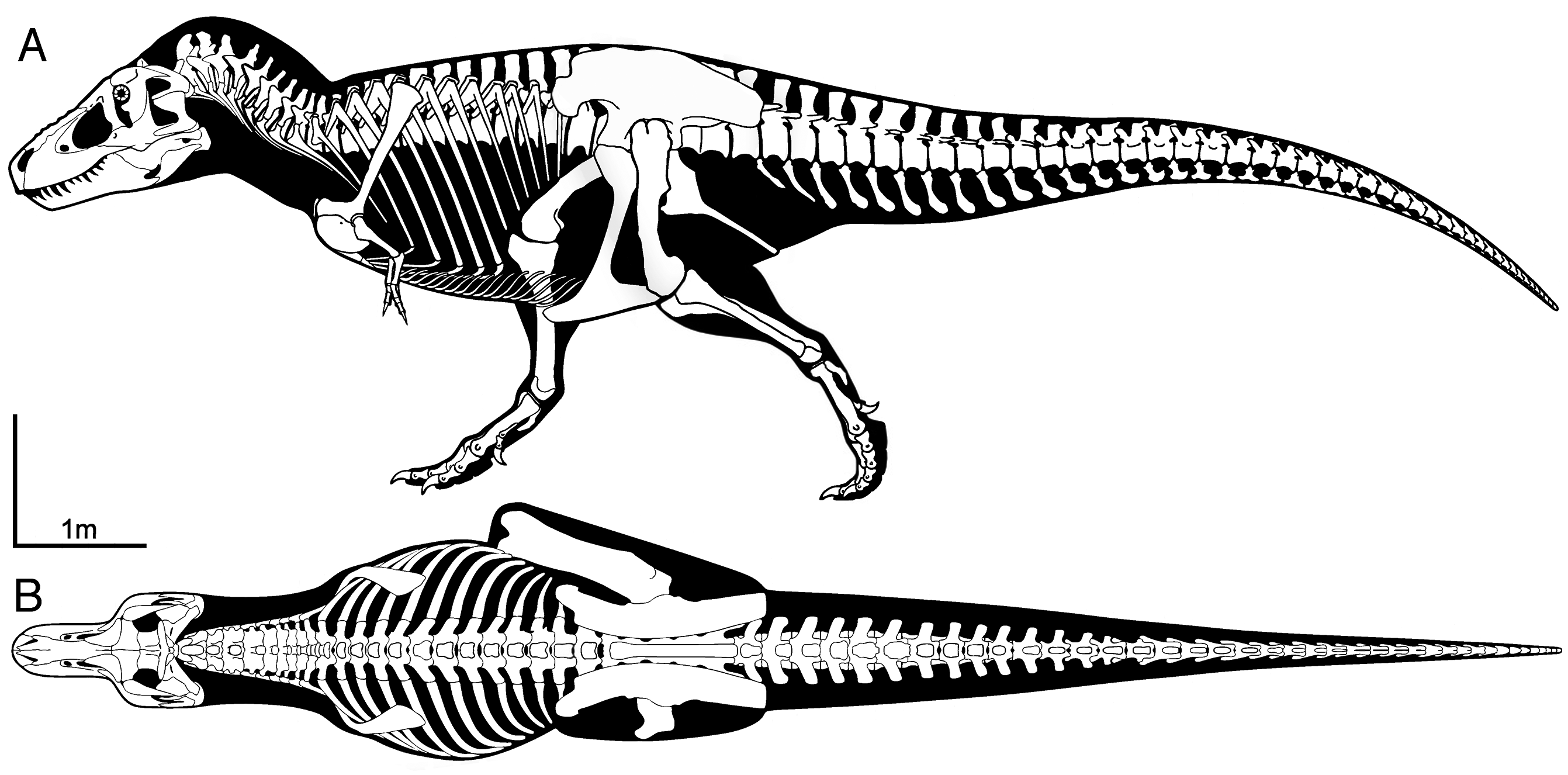
Skeletal reconstruction of specimen "Sue"

The vertebral column of Tyrannosaurus consisted of ten neck vertebrae, thirteen back vertebrae and five sacral vertebrae. The number of tail vertebrae is unknown and could well have varied between individuals but probably numbered at least forty. Sue was mounted with forty-seven of such caudal vertebrae. The neck of T. rex formed a natural S-shaped curve like that of other theropods. Compared to these, it was exceptionally short, deep and muscular to support the massive head. The second vertebra, the axis, was especially short. The remaining neck vertebrae were weakly opisthocoelous, i.e. with a convex front of the vertebral body and a concave rear. The vertebral bodies had single pleurocoels, pneumatic depressions created by air sacs, on their sides. The vertebral bodies of the torso were robust but with a narrow waist. Their undersides were keeled. The front sides were concave with a deep vertical trough. They had large pleurocoels. Their neural spines had very rough front and rear sides for the attachment of strong tendons. The sacral vertebrae were fused to each other, both in their vertebral bodies and neural spines. They were pneumatized. They were connected to the pelvis by transverse processes and sacral ribs. The tail was heavy and moderately long, in order to balance the massive head and torso and to provide space for massive locomotor muscles that attached to the thighbones. The thirteenth tail vertebra formed the transition point between the deep tail base and the middle tail that was stiffened by a long front articulation processes. The underside of the trunk was covered by eighteen or nineteen pairs of segmented belly ribs.

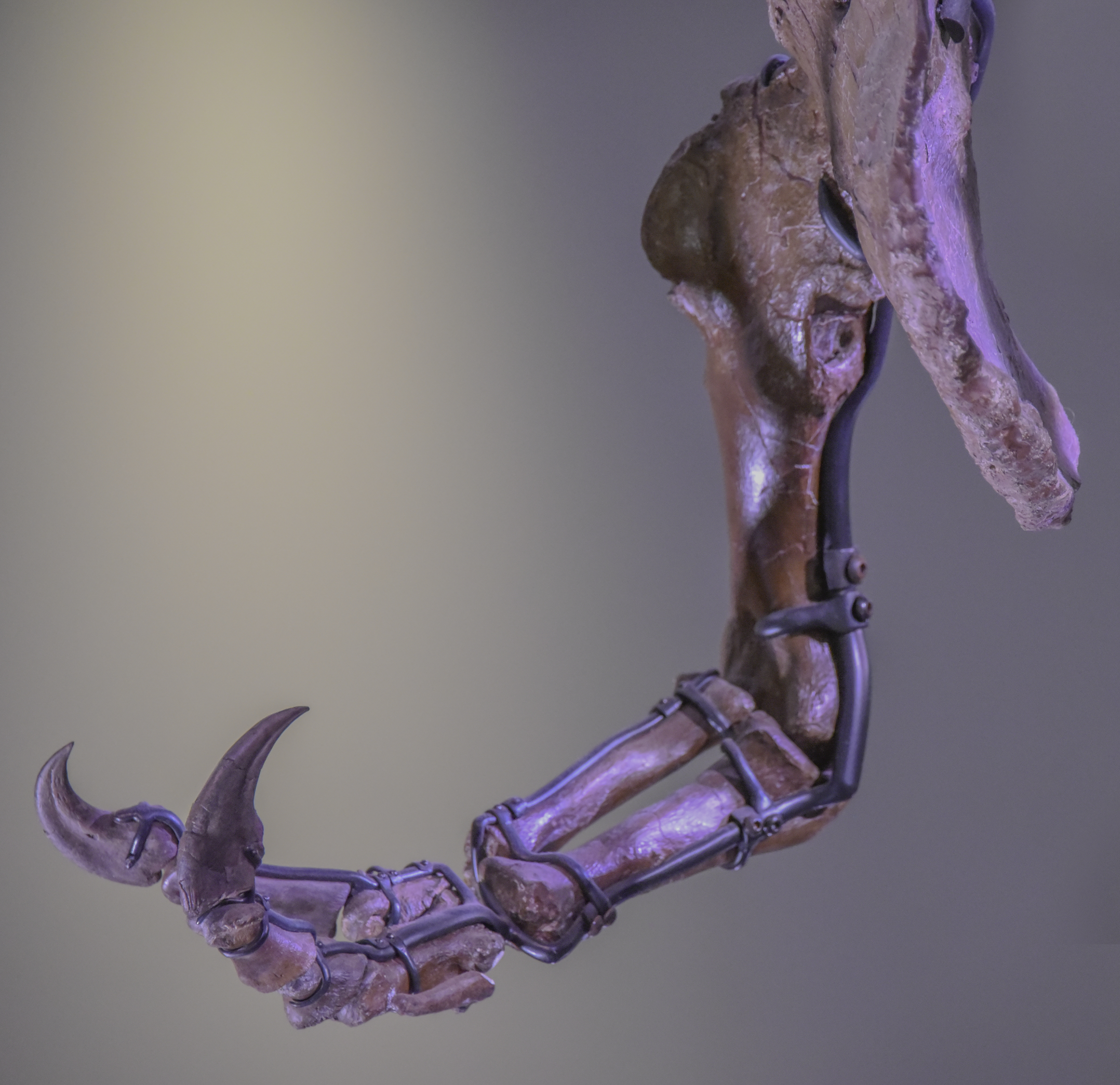
Right forelimb of specimen "Sue"

The shoulder girdle was longer than the entire forelimb. The shoulder blade had a narrow shaft but was exceptionally expanded at its upper end. It connected via a long forward protrusion to the coracoid, which was rounded. Both shoulder blades were connected by a small furcula. The paired breast bones possibly were made of cartilage only.

The forelimb or arm was very short. The upper arm bone, the humerus, was short but robust. It had a narrow upper end with an exceptionally rounded head. The lower arm bones, the ulna and radius, were straight elements, much shorter than the humerus. The second metacarpal was longer and wider than the first, whereas normally in theropods the opposite is true. The forelimbs had only two clawed fingers, along with an additional splint-like small third metacarpal representing the remnant of a third digit.

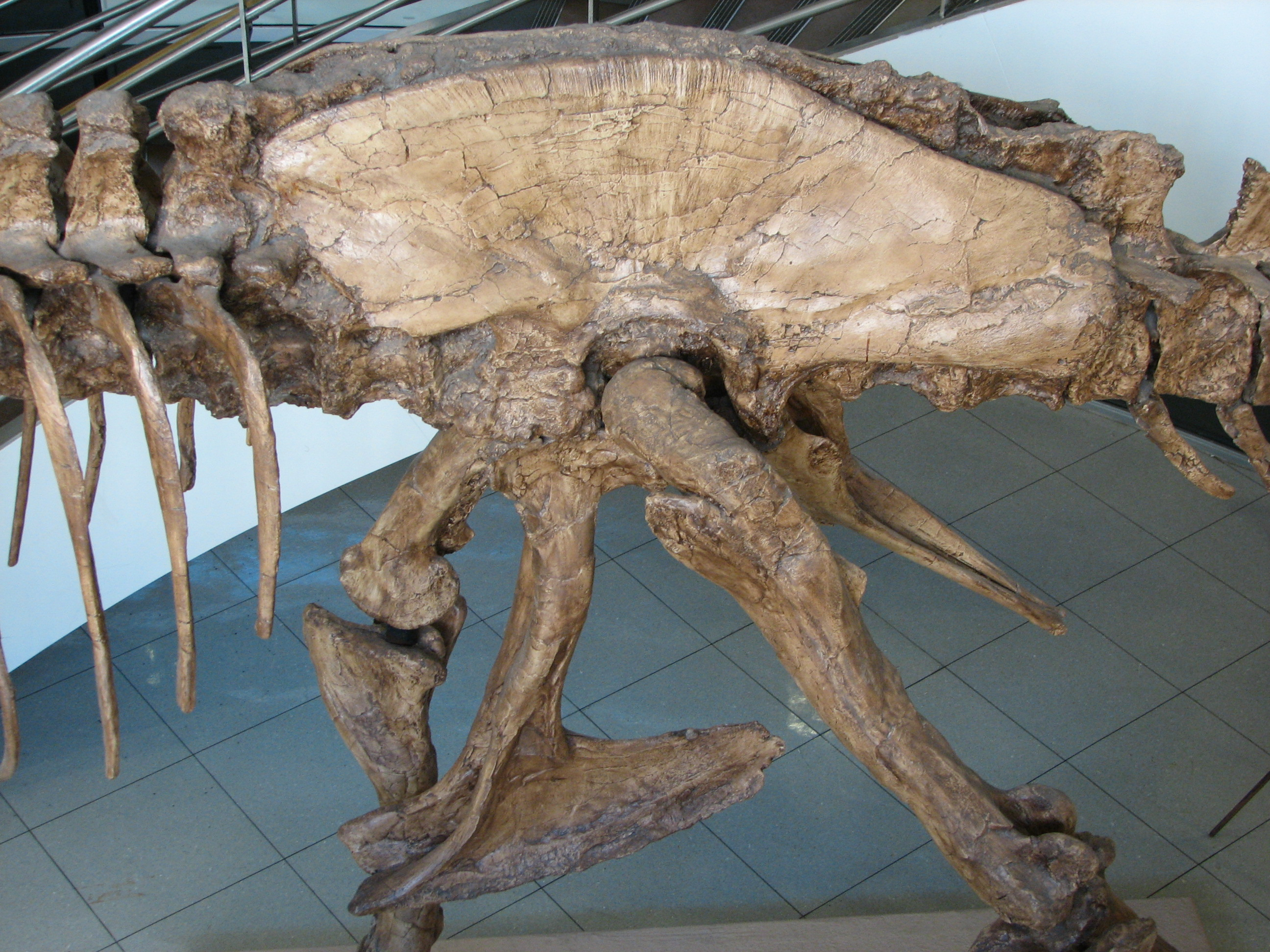
Pelvic girdle of specimen MOR 555

The pelvis was a large structure. Its upper bone, the ilium, was both very long and high, providing an extensive attachment area for hindlimb muscles. The front pubic bone ended in an enormous pubic boot, longer than the entire shaft of the element. The rear ischium was slender and straight, pointing obliquely to behind and below.

In contrast to the arms, the hindlimbs were among the longest in proportion to body size of any theropod. In the foot, the metatarsus was "arctometatarsalian", meaning that the part of the third metatarsal near the ankle was pinched. The third metatarsal was also exceptionally sinuous. Compensating for the immense bulk of the animal, many bones throughout the skeleton were hollowed, reducing its weight without significant loss of strength.

== Classification ==
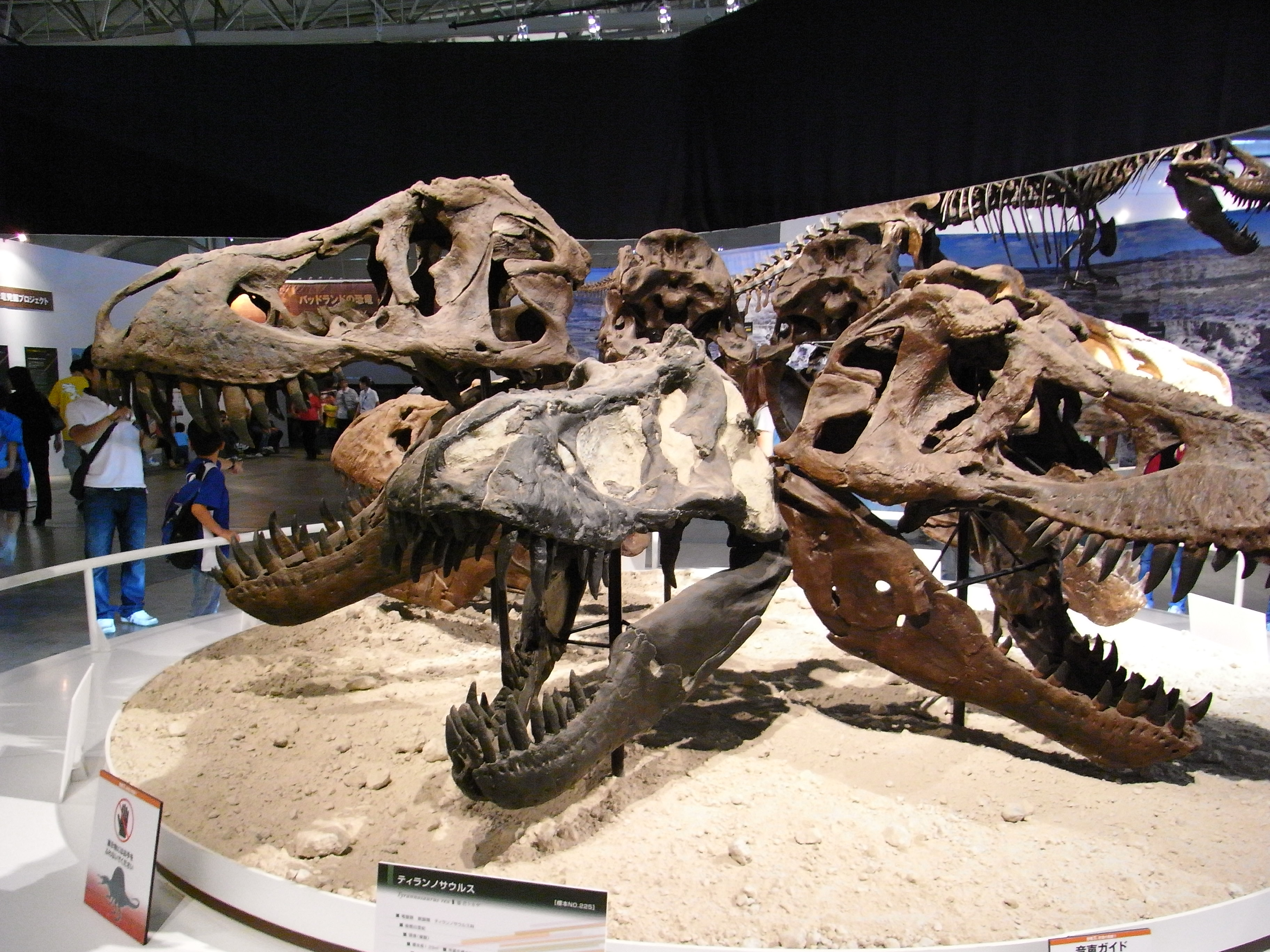
Skull casts of different Tyrannosaurus specimens

Tyrannosaurus is the type genus of the superfamily Tyrannosauroidea, the family Tyrannosauridae, and the subfamily Tyrannosaurinae; in other words it is the standard by which paleontologists decide whether to include other species in the group. Other members of the tyrannosaurine subfamily include the North American Daspletosaurus and the Asian Tarbosaurus, both of which have occasionally been synonymized with Tyrannosaurus.

Tyrannosaurids were once commonly thought to be descendants of earlier large theropods such as megalosaurs and carnosaurs, although more recently they were reclassified with the generally smaller coelurosaurs. The earliest tyrannosaur group were the crested proceratosaurids, while later and more derived members belong to the Pantyrannosauria. Tyrannosaurs started out as small theropods; at least some became larger by the Early Cretaceous. It is likely that tyrannosauroids rose to prominence after the decline in allosauroid and megalosauroid diversity seen during the early stages of the Late Cretaceous.

Tyrannosauroids are characterized by their fused nasals and dental arrangement. Pantyrannosaurs are characterized by unique features in their hips as well as an enlarged foramen in the quadrate, a broad postorbital and hourglass shaped nasals. Some of the more derived pantyrannosaurs lack nasal pneumaticity and have a lower humerus to femur ratio with their arms starting to see some reduction. Some pantyrannosaurs started developing an arctometatarsus. Eutyrannosaurs have a rough texture on their nasal bones and their mandibular fenestra is reduced externally. Tyrannosaurids lack kinetic skulls or special crests on their nasal bones, and have a lacrimal with a distinctive process on it. Tyrannosaurids also have an interfenestral strut that is less than half as big as the maxillary fenestra.

Many phylogenetic analyses have found Tarbosaurus bataar to be the sister taxon of T. rex. The discovery of the tyrannosaurid Lythronax further indicates that Tarbosaurus and Tyrannosaurus are closely related, forming a clade with fellow Asian tyrannosaurid Zhuchengtyrannus, with Lythronax being their sister taxon. A further study from 2016 by Steve Brusatte, Thomas Carr and colleagues, also indicates that Tyrannosaurus may have been an immigrant from Asia, as well as a possible descendant of Tarbosaurus.

This cladogram of Tyrannosauridae is based on the phylogenetic analysis conducted by Loewen and colleagues in 2013.

- Tyrannosauridae
  - Albertosaurinae
    - Gorgosaurus libratus
    - Albertosaurus sarcophagus
  - Tyrannosaurinae
    - Dinosaur Park tyrannosaurid
    - - Daspletosaurus torosus
      - - Two Medicine tyrannosaurid
        - - Teratophoneus curriei
          - - Bistahieversor sealeyi
            - - Lythronax argestes
              - - Tyrannosaurus rex
                - - Tarbosaurus bataar
                  - Zhuchengtyrannus magnus

In their 2024 description of Tyrannosaurus mcraeensis, Dalman et al. recovered similar results to previous analyses, with Tyrannosaurus as the sister taxon to the clade formed by Tarbosaurus and Zhuchengtyrannus, called the Tyrannosaurini. They also found support for a monophyletic clade containing Daspletosaurus and Thanatotheristes, typically referred to as the Daspletosaurini.

- - - Albertosaurus sarcophagus
    - Gorgosaurus libratus
  - - - - Daspletosaurus horneri
        - Thanatotheristes
      - - Daspletosaurus torosus
        - Daspletosaurus wilsoni
    - - Teratophoneus
      - - Nanuqsaurus
        - - Bistahieversor
          - - Lythronax
            - Tyrannosaurini
              - - Tyrannosaurus mcraeensis
                - Tyrannosaurus rex
              - - Zhuchengtyrannus
                - Tarbosaurus

=== Additional species ===
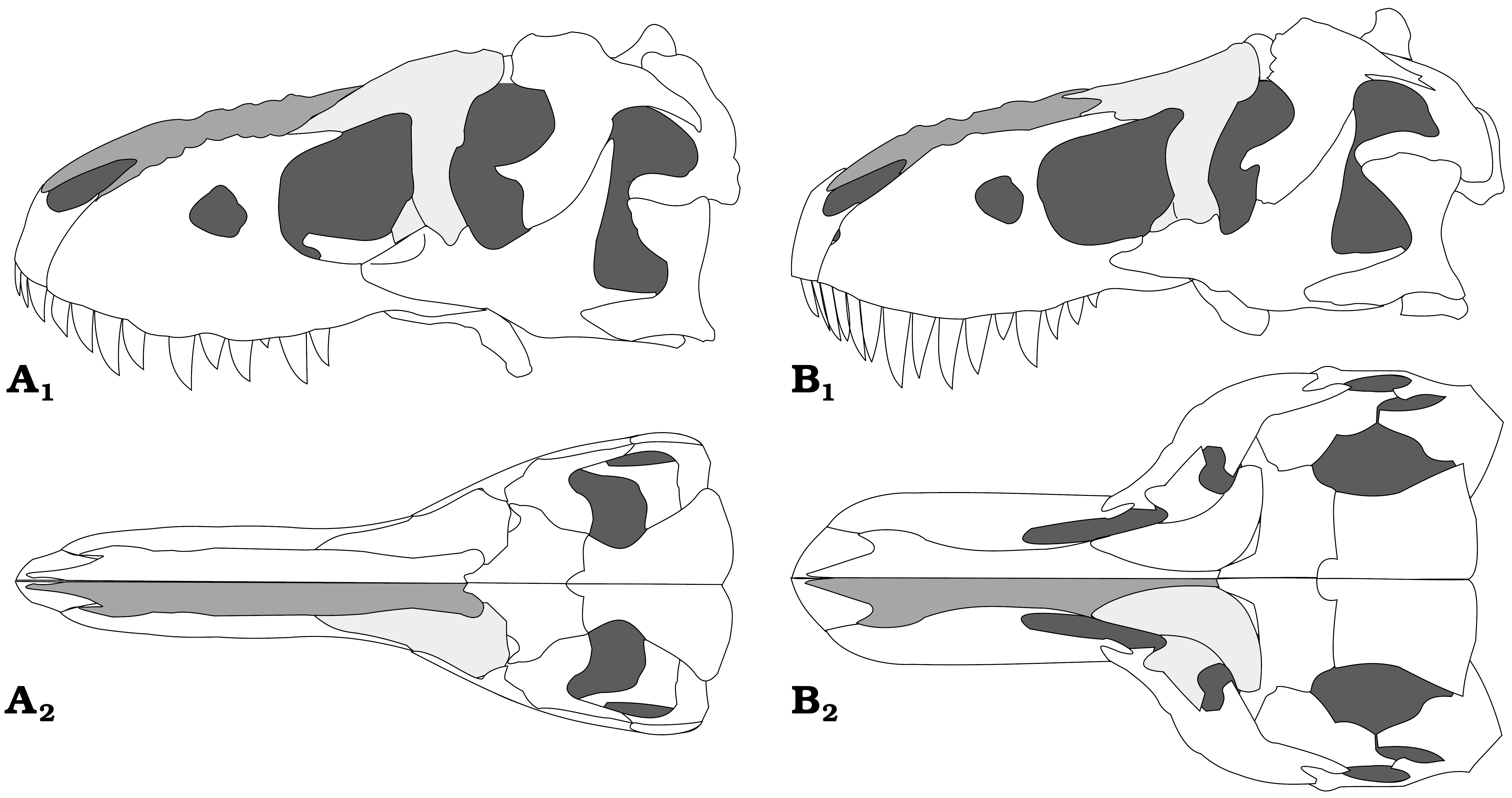
Diagram showing the differences between a generalized Tarbosaurus (A) and Tyrannosaurus rex (B) skull

In 1955, Soviet paleontologist Evgeny Maleev named a new species, Tyrannosaurus bataar, from Mongolia. By 1965, this species was renamed as a distinct genus, Tarbosaurus bataar. While most paleontologists continue to maintain the two as distinct genera, some authors such as Thomas Holtz, Kenneth Carpenter, and Thomas Carr argue that the two species are similar enough to be considered members of the same genus, restoring the Mongolian taxon's original binomial name.

Some specimens from the Late Cretaceous deposits of China have been described as new species of Tyrannosaurus: T. "lanpingensis" based on isolated lateral tooth from the red beds of Yunnan in 1975; T. "turpanensis" from the Subashi Formation, Turpan Basin, Xinjiang in 1978; and T. luanchuanensis from the Quiba Formation in Henan Province in 1979–1980. The former two taxa were published without detailed descriptions and are therefore nomina nuda. T. "turpanensis" and T. luanchuanensis were tentatively listed as junior synonyms of Tarbosaurus bataar by Holtz in 2004; Holtz also listed T. "lanpingensis," but as a nomen dubium.

VGI, no. 231/3, a large phalanx bone, assigned to Tyrannosaurus sp. by Yarkov in 2000, was found in the Lower Maastrichtian of Bereslavka, Russia. In 2004, Averianov and Yarkov reinterpreted it as a metacarpal or metatarsal that possibly belongs to ceratosaur. In their 2023 overview, Averianov and Lopatin mention this specimen as well as a single tooth from the same site only as Theropoda indet.

In 2001, various tyrannosaurid teeth and a metatarsal unearthed in a quarry near Zhucheng, China, were assigned by paleontologist Hu Chengzhi to the newly erected species Tyrannosaurus zhuchengensis. However, in a nearby site, a right maxilla and left jawbone were assigned to the newly erected tyrannosaurid genus Zhuchengtyrannus in 2011. It is possible that T. zhuchengensis is synonymous with Zhuchengtyrannus. T. zhuchengensis is considered to be a nomen dubium as the holotype lacks diagnostic features below the level Tyrannosaurinae.

In 2006, a fragmentary tyrannosaurid lacrimal (CM 9401) from the Judith River Formation of Fergus County, Montana, was described as ?Tyrannosaurus sp. This isolated right lacrimal was originally collected alongside the holotype specimen of Deinosuchus rugosus, a giant crocodilian, and remained undescribed until its re-identification as belonging to a tyrannosaurid theropod in the 1980s by paleontologist Dale Russell. The lacrimal closely resembles those of Tyrannosaurus rex in both size and morphology. Notably, it lacks the "lacrimal horn" typically present in earlier tyrannosaurids like Albertosaurus and Gorgosaurus, instead exhibiting a distinct rugosity along the dorsal surface—consistent with T. rex and its Asian relative Tarbosaurus. The specimen's size places it within the range of known T. rex individuals, suggesting the presence of large tyrannosaurids during the Campanian stage (~75 million years ago), a temporal range earlier than the established Maastrichtian age (~68–66 Ma) for Tyrannosaurus rex. However, the exact age and provenance of CM 9401 remain uncertain due to a lack of detailed field documentation.

In 2018, a paper describing tyrannosaurid teeth from the Two Medicine Formation noted a premaxillary tooth (YPM VPPU 023469) had a strong resemblance to the teeth of Sue to the exclusion of any Campanian tyrannosaurid. Additionally, the authors of this paper suggested that CM 9401 also comes from the Two Medicine Formation, as there were preservational similarities between its locality and the Willow Creek anticline where the tooth was found. This would place both specimens in the Flag Butte Member of the Two Medicine Formation, which dates from 77 to 76.3 Ma, far older than any other Tyrannosaurus specimen, and directly contemporaneous with Daspletosaurus. In 2025, these specimens were used by Charlie Scherer to suggest that the Tyrannosaurini did not evolve directly from Daspletosaurus.

=== Tyrannosaurus imperator and Tyrannosaurus regina ===
In a 2022 study, Gregory S. Paul and colleagues argued that Tyrannosaurus rex, as traditionally understood, actually represents three species: the type species Tyrannosaurus rex, and two previously unrecognized species: T. imperator (meaning "tyrant lizard emperor") and T. regina (meaning "tyrant lizard queen"). The holotype of the former (T. imperator) is the Sue specimen, and the holotype of the latter (T. regina) is Wankel rex. The division into multiple species was primarily based on the high degree of variation in the proportions and robusticity of the femur (and other skeletal elements) across T. rex specimens. Presumed robust and gracile morphotypes and the number of small incisiform teeth in the dentary were also used as a line of evidence. Paul and colleagues categorized the species as follows: T. rex demonstrates robust anatomy, a moderate ratio of femur length vs circumference, and the possession of a singular slender incisiform dentary tooth, T. imperator is robust with a small femur length to circumference ratio and two of the slender teeth, and T. regina is more gracile with a high femur ratio and one of the slender teeth.

However, several paleontologists, including Stephen Brusatte, Thomas Carr, Thomas Holtz, David Hone, Jingmai O'Connor, and Lindsay Zanno, criticized the study or expressed skepticism of its conclusions. Holtz and Zanno both remarked that it was plausible that more than one species of Tyrannosaurus existed, but felt the new study was insufficient to support the species it proposed. Holtz remarked that, even if Tyrannosaurus imperator represented a distinct species from Tyrannosaurus rex, it may represent the same species as Nanotyrannus lancensis and would need to be called Tyrannosaurus lancensis. O'Connor, a curator at the Field Museum, where the T. imperator holotype Sue is displayed, regarded the new species as too poorly-supported to justify modifying the exhibit signs. Brusatte, Carr, and O'Connor viewed the distinguishing features proposed between the species as reflecting natural variation within a species. Both Carr and O'Connor expressed concerns about the study's inability to determine which of the proposed species several well-preserved specimens belonged to. Another paleontologist, Philip J. Currie, originally co-authored the study but withdrew from it as he did not want to be involved in naming the new species.

In a paper published in 2025, Paul maintained the validity of T. imperator and T. regina, arguing that these proposed species could be further distinguished by the shape of their postorbital bosses (bony rugosities behind the eyes).

=== Tyrannosaurus mcraeensis ===
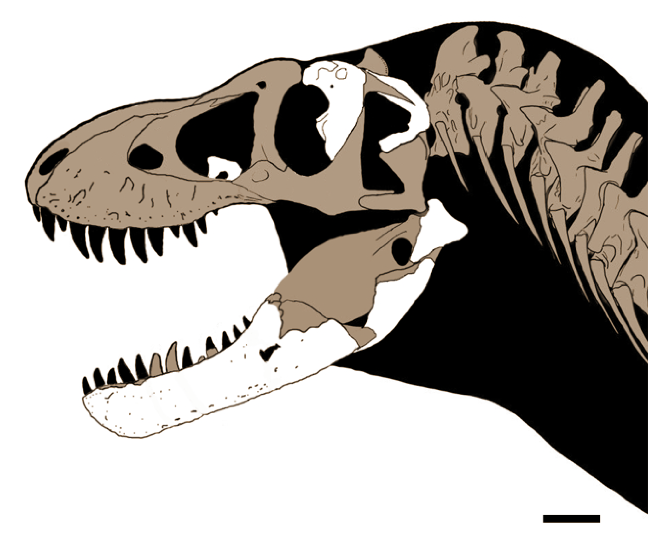
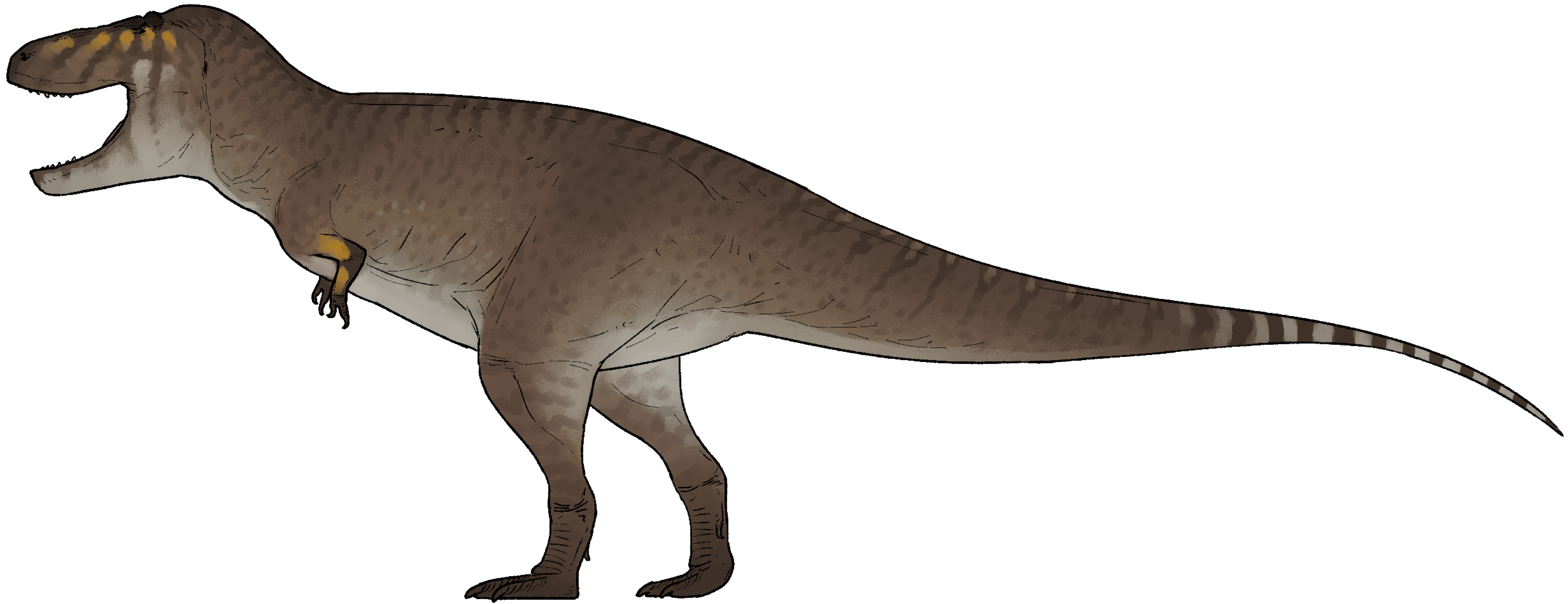
Reconstructed skull (top) and speculative life restoration (bottom) of T. mcraeensis

In 2024, Dalman and colleagues described the remains of a tyrannosaur discovered in 1983 in the Campanian-early Maastrichtian Hall Lake Formation in New Mexico. Reposited at the New Mexico Museum of Natural History and Science, the fossil material (NMMNH P-3698) consists of the right postorbital, right squamosal, left palatine, and an incomplete maxilla from the skull, the left dentary, right splenial, right prearticular, right angular and right articular from the lower jaws, isolated teeth, and chevrons. Some of the bones were briefly mentioned in 1984 as belonging to T. rex, and described in 1986.

Lehman and Carpenter (1990) suggested that NMMNH P-3698 belonged to a new tyrannosaurid genus, while Carr and Williamson (2000) disagreed with their claim. Sullivan and Lucas (2015) argued that there is little evidence to support NMMNH P-3698 as a specimen of Tyrannosaurus rex, so they tentatively classified it as cf. Tyrannosaurus sp.; they also considered that the McRae tyrannosaur lived before the Lancian (before 67 million years ago) based on its probable association with the Alamosaurus fossil.

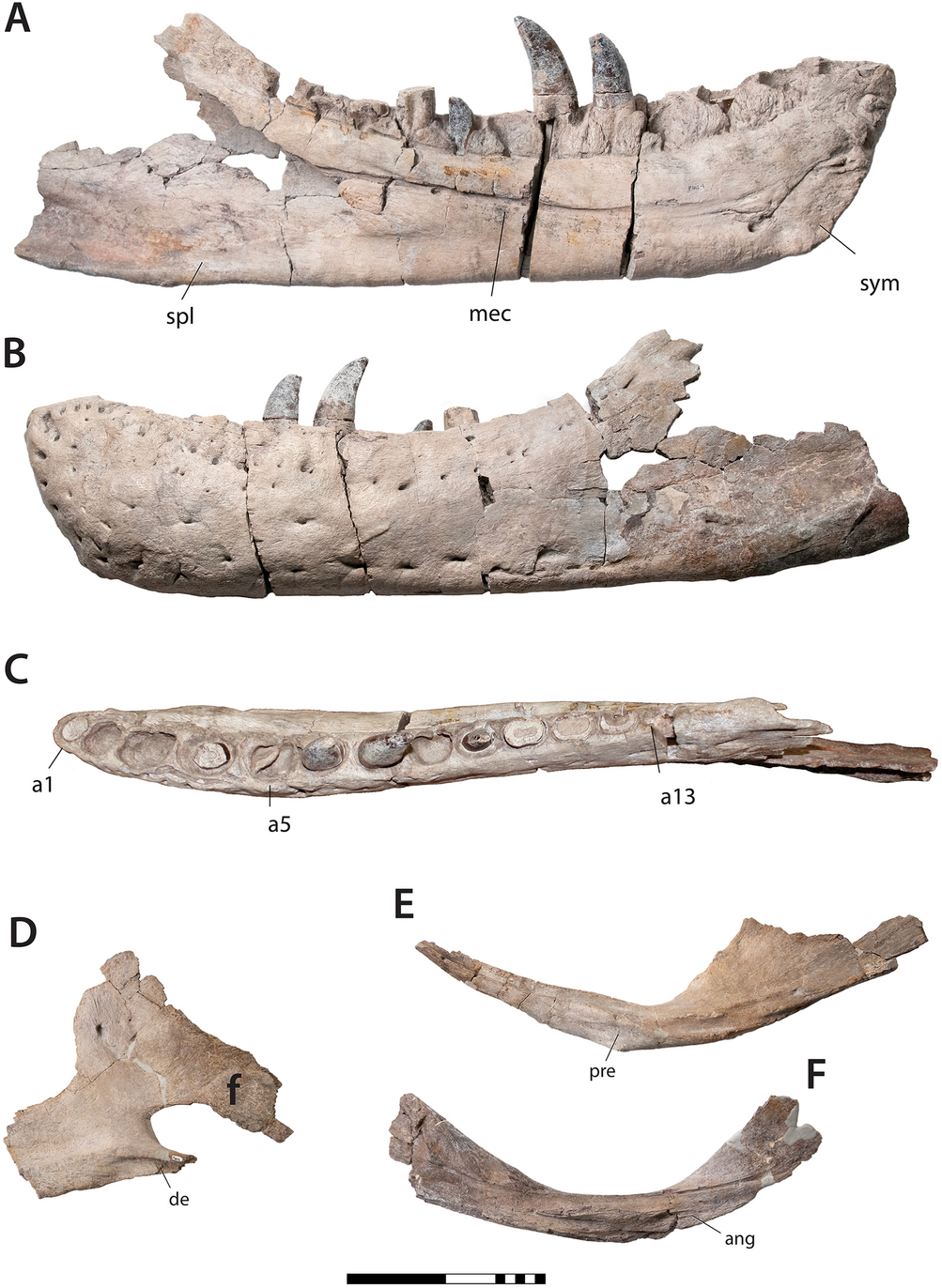
Mandibular elements of the T. mcraeensis holotype

Dalman and colleagues proposed the new name Tyrannosaurus mcraeensis for the holotype (NMMNH P-3698), referencing the McRae Group, the rock layers to which the Hall Lake Formation belongs. The authors argued that the holotype of T. mcraeensis is found in the strata that are around a few million years older than the accepted range of T. rex at the end of the Maastrichtian, potentially between the latest Campanian and earliest Maastrichtian. T. mcraeensis was estimated at 12 metres (39 ft) long, which is similar to the size of an adult T. rex. The two are distinguished by characters of the skull. Amongst these, the dentary of T. mcraeensis is proportionately longer and possesses a less prominent chin, and the lower jaw shallower than that of T. rex, suggesting a weaker bite. The teeth are likewise blunter and more laterally compressed, while the post orbital crests are less prominent. Likewise, the skeletal anatomy showcases shared characteristics with Tarbosaurus and Zhuchengtyrannus.

The validity of T. mcraeensis was questioned by other researchers in 2025. Morrison and colleagues noted the uncertainty in the previous age estimate and argued that the inclusion of the titanosaurian fossil (cf. Alamosaurus) as a biostratigraphic marker of the Hall Lake Formation fauna makes the dating problematic due to the fossil having a huge variability in assumed sedimentation rates. The study also suggested the uncertainty in the morphology of T. mcraeensis holotype being reliably outside the known variation of T. rex. Regardless of the age and validity of T. mcraeensis, the authors concluded that the genus Tyrannosaurus still most likely originated from Laramidia and that the ancestors of this genus possibly migrated from Asia. Later that year, Voris and colleagues regarded T. mcraeensis as a junior synonym of T. rex, agreeing with the problematic stratigraphic data and finding all of the proposed diagnostic characters of T. mcraeensis to be in the known T. rex specimen range of variation. In his study of the T. rex holotype skull, Carr also did not regard T. mcraeensis as a valid species, agreeing with the proposed characters of the T. mcraeensis holotype being visible throughout the hypodigm of T. rex. In 2026, Jeffery M. Amato and colleagues reported the tuff situated directly below the rock layer that yielded the holotype of T. mcraeensis, and argued that its age was dated to 69.422 ± 0.032 Ma based on U-Pb zircon dating. This would suggest that the age of T. mcraeensis was no earlier than the mid-Maastrichtian, and that it was much closer to that of T. rex than previously thought.

=== Nanotyrannus ===
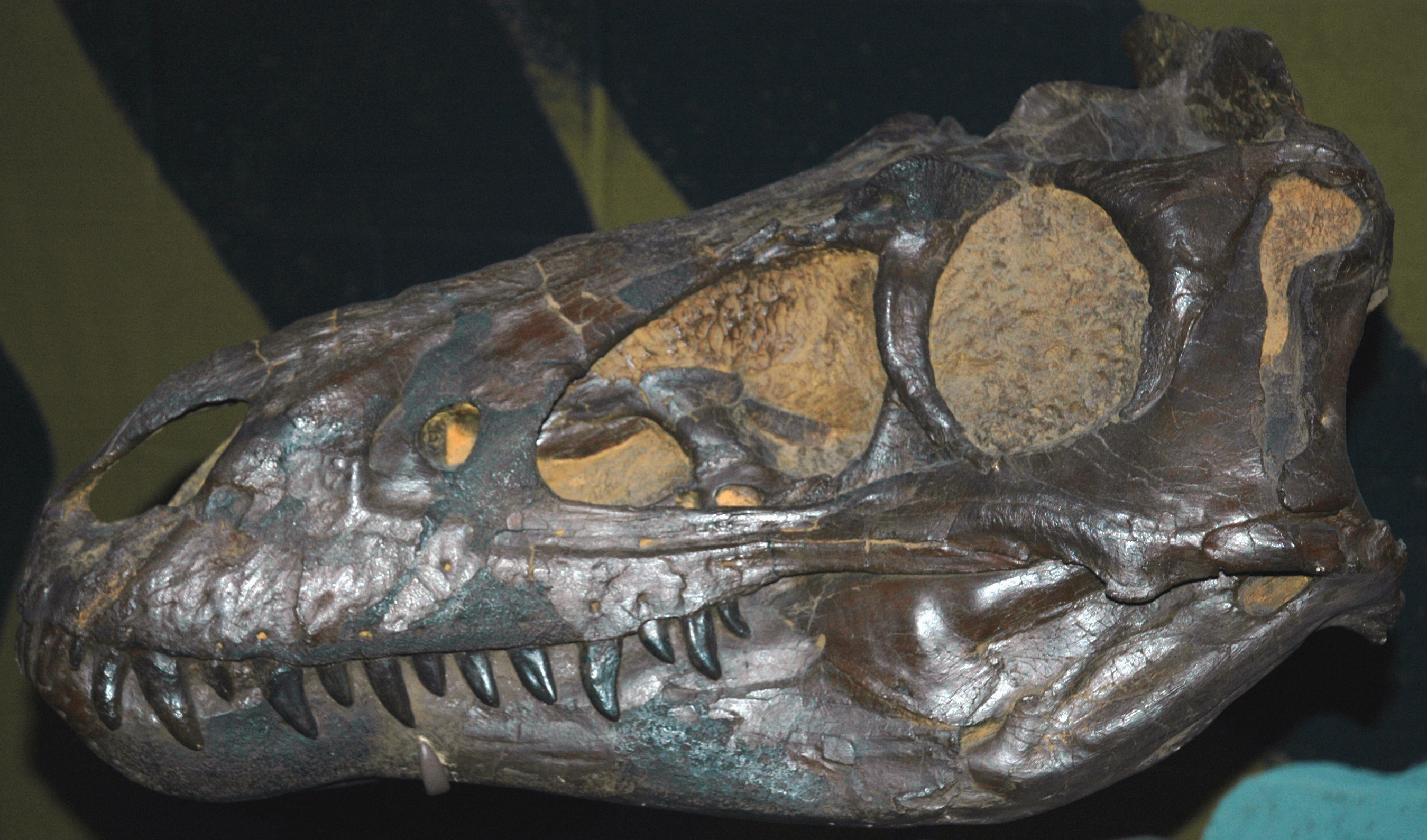
Cast of CMNH 7541, the holotype of Nanotyrannus lancensis, sometimes interpreted as a juvenile Tyrannosaurus.

Other tyrannosaur fossils found in the same formations as T. rex were originally classified as separate taxa, including Aublysodon and Albertosaurus megagracilis, the latter being named Dinotyrannus megagracilis in 1995. These fossils are now universally considered to belong to juvenile T. rex. A small but nearly complete skull from Montana, 57.2 centimeters (1.88 ft) long, is an exception. This skull, CMNH 7541, was originally classified as a species of Gorgosaurus (G. lancensis) by Charles W. Gilmore in 1946. In 1988, the specimen was re-described by Robert T. Bakker, Michael Williams, then the curator of paleontology at the Cleveland Museum of Natural History, and Phil Currie, where the original specimen was housed and is now on display. Their initial research indicated that the skull bones were fused, and that it therefore represented an adult specimen. In light of this, Bakker and colleagues assigned the skull to a new genus named Nanotyrannus (meaning "dwarf tyrant", for its apparently small adult size). However, in 1999, a detailed analysis by Thomas Carr revealed the specimen to be a juvenile, leading Carr and many other paleontologists to consider it a juvenile T. rex individual.

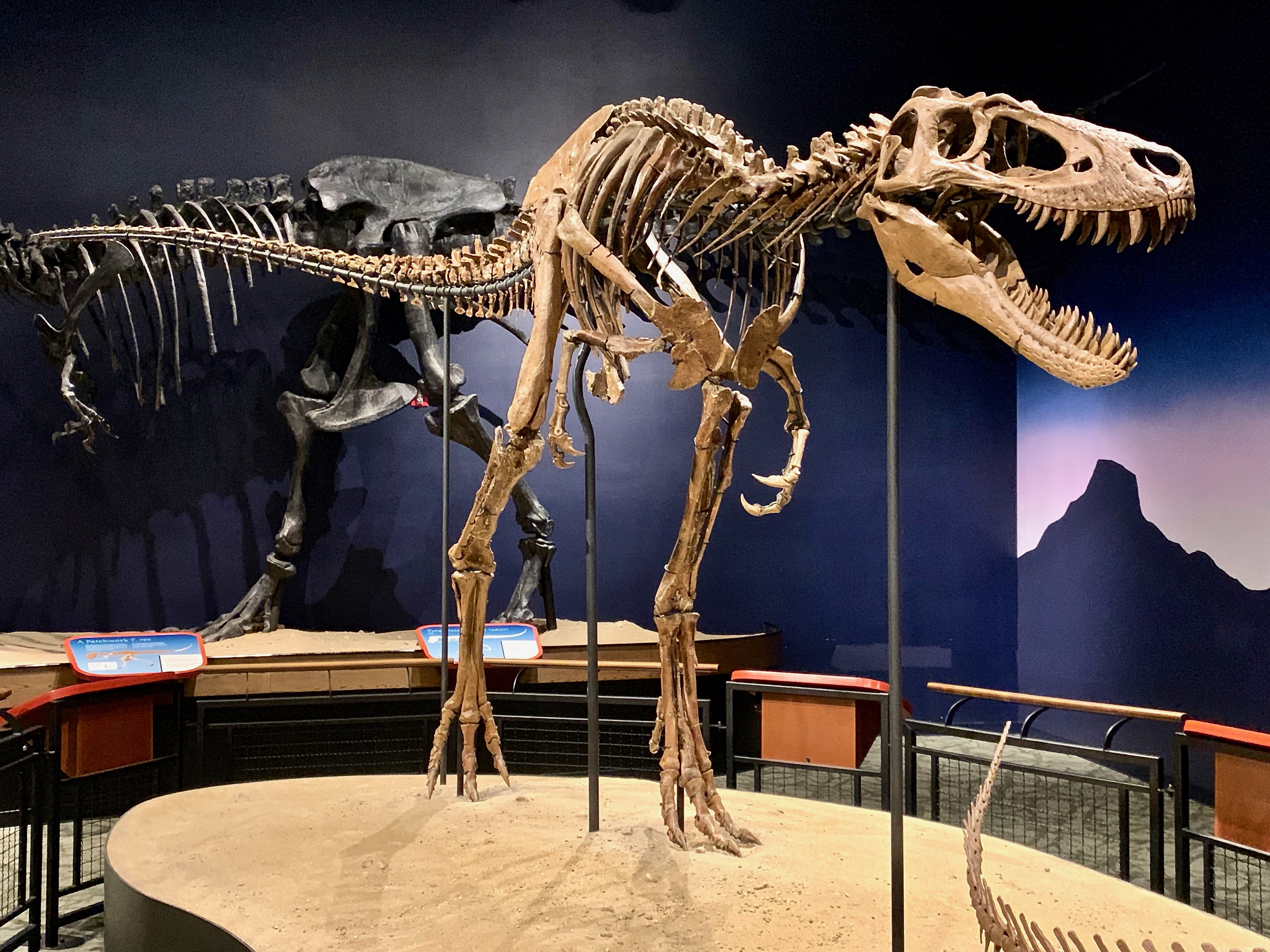
Reconstructed skeleton of "Jane", Burpee Museum of Natural History

In 2001, a more complete juvenile tyrannosaur (nicknamed "Jane", accession number BMRP 2002.4.1), suggested to belong to the same species as the original Nanotyrannus specimen, was uncovered. This discovery prompted a conference on tyrannosaurs focused on the issues of the validity of Nanotyrannus, held at the Burpee Museum of Natural History in 2005. Several paleontologists who had previously published opinions that N. lancensis was a valid species, including Currie and Williams, saw the discovery of "Jane" as a confirmation that Nanotyrannus was, in fact, a juvenile T. rex. Peter Larson continued to support the hypothesis that Nanotyrannus lancensis was a separate but closely related species, and also argued that Stygivenator (LACM 28471), which is generally considered to be a juvenile of Tyrannosaurus rex, could be a younger specimen of Nanotyrannus.

In 2011, news reports about a 2006 discovery of a new, virtually complete theropod specimen found alongside a ceratopsid were made. The specimens were studied by Robert Bakker and Peter Larson on-site, who identified the ceratopsian as Triceratops and the theropod as Nanotyrannus. It was impossible to determine whether the theropod specimen, nicknamed "Bloody Mary", was distinct from T. rex, as the specimen remained in private hands until 2020, when the ownership of the specimen was decided by the Montana Supreme Court to be given to the landowners Mary Anne and Lige Murray. The fossil was acquired by the North Carolina Museum of Natural Sciences in 2020. In 2025, paleontologists Lindsay Zanno and James Napoli published an initial description of the "Bloody Mary" specimen as part of an extensive revision of the genus Nanotyrannus. They identified this specimen as a skeletally mature individual of Nanotyrannus and provided several lines of evidence supporting the validity of this genus. They also described a second species, N. lethaeus, based on the Jane specimen due to notable differences between it and N. lancensis.

== Paleobiology ==
=== Life history ===
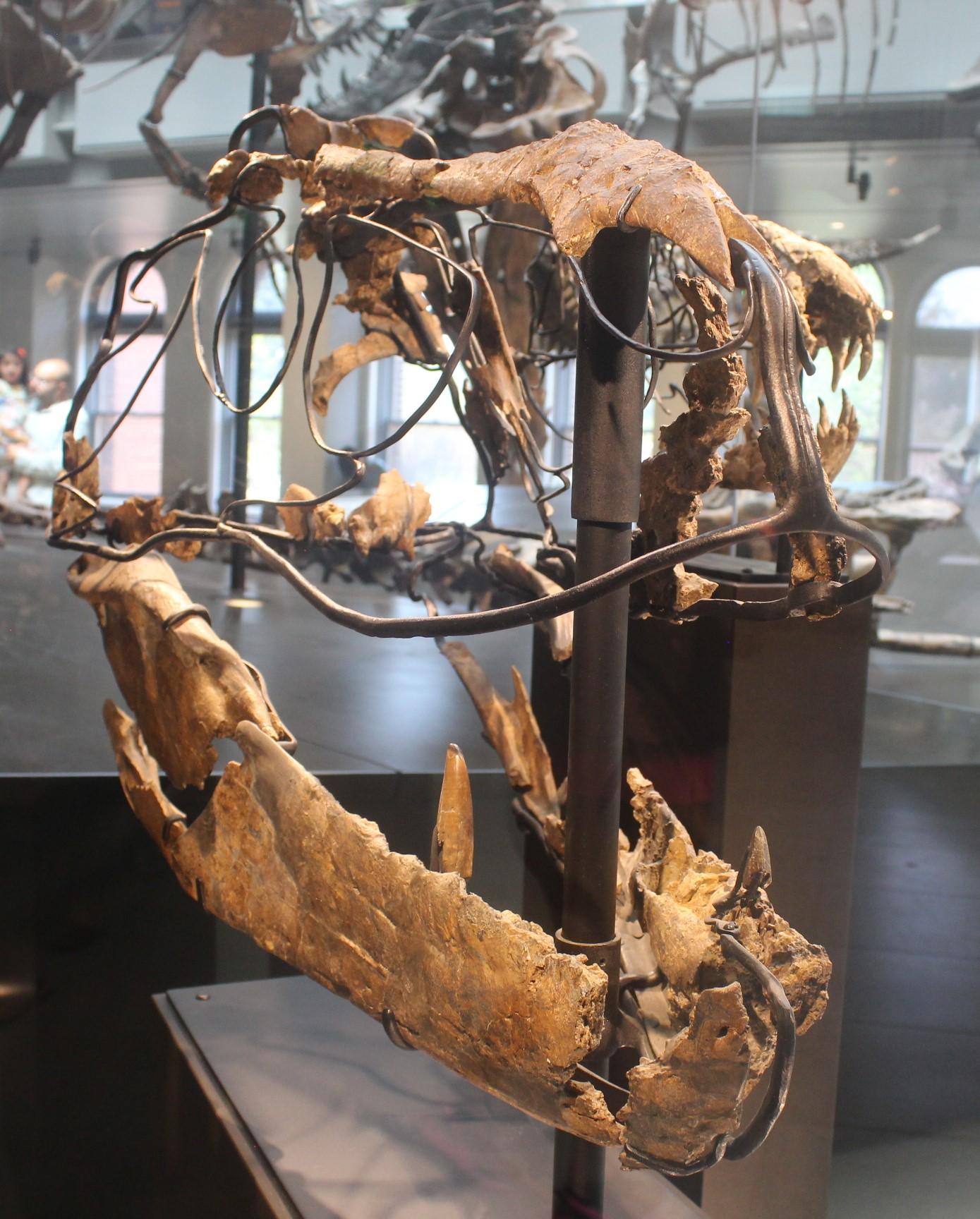
Skull of a juvenile T. rex formerly classified as Dinotyrannus megagracilis

The identification of several specimens as juvenile T. rex has allowed scientists to document ontogenetic changes in the species, estimate the lifespan, and determine how quickly the animals would have grown. The Stygivenator holotype (LACM 28471, the "Jordan theropod"), possibly a juvenile T. rex, is estimated to have weighed only 30 kg (66 lb), while the largest adults, such as FMNH PR2081 (Sue) most likely weighed about 5,650 kg (12,460 lb). Histologic analysis of T. rex bones showed LACM 28471 had aged only 2 years when it died. Sue was initially estimated at 28 years old, an age which was at the time considered close to the maximum for the species, but the most recent studies estimate Sue's age at 27–33 years. Similarly, Trix (RGM 792.000) is estimated to have been at least 30 years old at time of death.

Histology has also allowed the age of other specimens to be determined. Growth curves can be developed when the ages of different specimens are plotted on a graph along with their mass. A T. rex growth curve is S-shaped, with juveniles remaining under 1,800 kg (4,000 lb) until approximately 14 years of age, when body size began to increase dramatically. During this rapid growth phase, a young T. rex would gain an average of 600 kg (1,300 lb) a year for the next four years. At 18 years of age, the curve plateaus again, indicating that growth slowed dramatically. For example, only 600 kg (1,300 lb) separated the 28-year-old Sue from a 22-year-old Canadian specimen (RTMP 81.12.1). A 2004 histological study performed by different workers corroborates these results, finding that rapid growth began to slow at around 16 years of age.

A graph showing the hypothesized growth curve, body mass versus age (drawn in black, with other tyrannosaurids for comparison), based on Erickson and colleagues 2004. Studies like this are now known to have been skewed by the inclusion of specimens now considered Nanotyrannus

A study by Hutchinson and colleagues in 2011 corroborated the previous estimation methods in general, but their estimation of peak growth rates is significantly higher; it found that the "maximum growth rates for T. rex during the exponential stage are 1790 kg/year". Although these results were much higher than previous estimations, the authors noted that these results significantly lowered the great difference between its actual growth rate and the one which would be expected of an animal of its size. The sudden change in growth rate at the end of the growth spurt may indicate physical maturity, a hypothesis which is supported by the discovery of medullary tissue in the femur of a 16 to 20-year-old T. rex from Montana (MOR 1125, also known as B-rex). Medullary tissue is found only in female birds during ovulation, indicating that B-rex was of reproductive age. Further study indicates an age of 18 for this specimen. In 2016, it was finally confirmed by Mary Higby Schweitzer and Lindsay Zanno and colleagues that the soft tissue within the femur of MOR 1125 was medullary tissue. This also confirmed the identity of the specimen as a female. The discovery of medullary bone tissue within Tyrannosaurus may prove valuable in determining the sex of other dinosaur species in future examinations, as the chemical makeup of medullary tissue is unmistakable. Other tyrannosaurids exhibit extremely similar growth curves, although with lower growth rates corresponding to their lower adult sizes.

An additional study published in 2020 by Woodward and colleagues, for the journal Science Advances indicates that during their growth from juvenile to adult, Tyrannosaurus was capable of slowing down its growth to counter environmental factors such as lack of food. Based on BMRP 2002.4.1 and BMRP 2006.4.4 between 13 and 15 years old housed at the Burpee Museum in Illinois then referred to as juvenile Tyrannosaurus specimens, the authors suggested that the rate of maturation for Tyrannosaurus was dependent on resource abundance. This study also indicates that in such changing environments, Tyrannosaurus was particularly well-suited to an environment that shifted yearly in regards to resource abundance, hinting that other midsize predators might have had difficulty surviving in such harsh conditions and explaining the niche partitioning between juvenile and adult tyrannosaurs. The study further suggested that Tyrannosaurus and Nanotyrannus are synonymous, due to analysis of the growth rings in the bones of the two specimens studied.

In January 2026, Woodward, Myhrvold and Horner performed a comprehensive histological analysis of 17 tyrannosaur specimens, and argued that Tyrannosaurus likely experienced a more gradual annual growth rate slope than indicated by earlier studies and evidence of a protracted subadult stage, reaching asymptotic size at around 35–40 years of age. The upper limit of the annual growth rate estimate is approximately 43–53 years. They also found that the growth trajectories of BMRP 2002.4.1 and BMRP 2006.4.4 do not fit with other Tyrannosaurus specimens in their growth curve model. While they acknowledged the possibility of these ontogenetically immature specimens representing Nanotyrannus as suggested by Zanno and Napoli (2025), they noted that the inconsistencies of these specimens observed in the growth curve do not necessarily bear weight on the proposal that Nanotyrannus is a distinct taxon.

In July 2026, Longrich and colleagues described a third metatarsal bone of perinate (hatchling) Tyrannosaurus rex and cf. Gorgosaurus libratus, RSKM P2416.82 from the Frenchman Formation and TMP 1981.16.475 from the Dinosaur Park Formation respectively. Histological analyses reveal that lines of arrested growth are absent in both specimens, indicative of hatchling or embryonic stage. Synchrotron scans of each specimen reveal the relatively high density of the outer surface and the pattern changes in cortical (outer layer) bone structure, with a layer similar to the hatchling/neonatal line of modern oviparous (egg-laying) and viviparous (giving live birth) taxa that characterize the transition from embryonic to hatchling stage. The scans also detected evidence of Haversian bone remodeling, the continuous process of bone tissue breaking down and rebuilding to form secondary canals (tubular channels connecting bones), which are indicative of hatchling stage and precociality, relative maturity and mobility at birth. The layer lining the medullary cavity of both specimens likely represent endosteal bone deposition, during which new bone matrix is deposited on the inner surface of the cortical bone. The authors also described a partial dentary (FMNH PR 4920) from the Hell Creek Formation and isolated teeth from the Lance Formation as hatchling T. rex and interpret their tooth wear as evidence of consuming relatively large vertebrates.

The body length and body mass of the hatchling T. rex (RSKM P2416.82) are estimated to be approximately 75 cm (2.46 ft) and 2.5 kg (5.5 lb) respectively, and those of the hatchling cf. G. libratus (TMP 1981.16.475) are estimated to be approximately 70 cm (2.3 ft) and 2.4 kg (5.3 lb) respectively. On the basis of these body size estimates, Longrich et al. (2026) suggested that the clutch of the confirmed, reproductively mature female T. rex (MOR 1125) would have weighed at least 54–60 kg (119–132 lb) which would possibly correspond to 21-32 eggs. They further stated that larger clutch sizes are also plausible, indicating that tyrannosaurids possibly employed R-selection, a reproductive strategy that maximizes the number of offsprings through large clutch size and minimal parental investment, which would have resulted in rapid maturation of the hatchlings, slower than that of modern birds. It is also likely that the reproduction strategy of tyrannosaurids was an intermediate between R-selection and K-selection, the latter of which would maximize parental investment with fewer number of offsprings and delayed maturation. Given the uniparental care observed in modern crocodilians and basal (early-diverging) birds, most non-avian dinosaurs including T. rex were likely uniparental as well. The authors also estimated that the relative size of tyrannosaurid hatchlings and eggs are larger than that of squamates, turtles, crocodilians, pterosaurs, and certain dinosaur clades (protoceratopsids and basal sauropodomorphs), but smaller than that of eumaniraptorans and modern birds, probably weighing less in both relative and absolute size than those of the elephant bird Aepyornis maximus and the South Island giant moa.

Over half of the known T. rex specimens appear to have died within six years of reaching sexual maturity, a pattern which is also seen in other tyrannosaurs and in some large, long-lived birds and mammals today. These species are characterized by high infant mortality rates, followed by relatively low mortality among juveniles. Mortality increases again following sexual maturity, partly due to the stresses of reproduction. One study suggests that the rarity of juvenile T. rex fossils is due in part to low juvenile mortality rates; the animals were not dying in large numbers at these ages, and thus were not often fossilized. This rarity may also be due to the incompleteness of the fossil record or to the bias of fossil collectors towards larger, more spectacular specimens. In a 2013 lecture, Thomas Holtz Jr. suggested that dinosaurs "lived fast and died young" because they reproduced quickly whereas mammals have long lifespans because they take longer to reproduce. Gregory S. Paul also writes that Tyrannosaurus reproduced quickly and died young but attributes their short lifespans to the dangerous lives they lived.

=== Skin and possible filamentous feathering ===
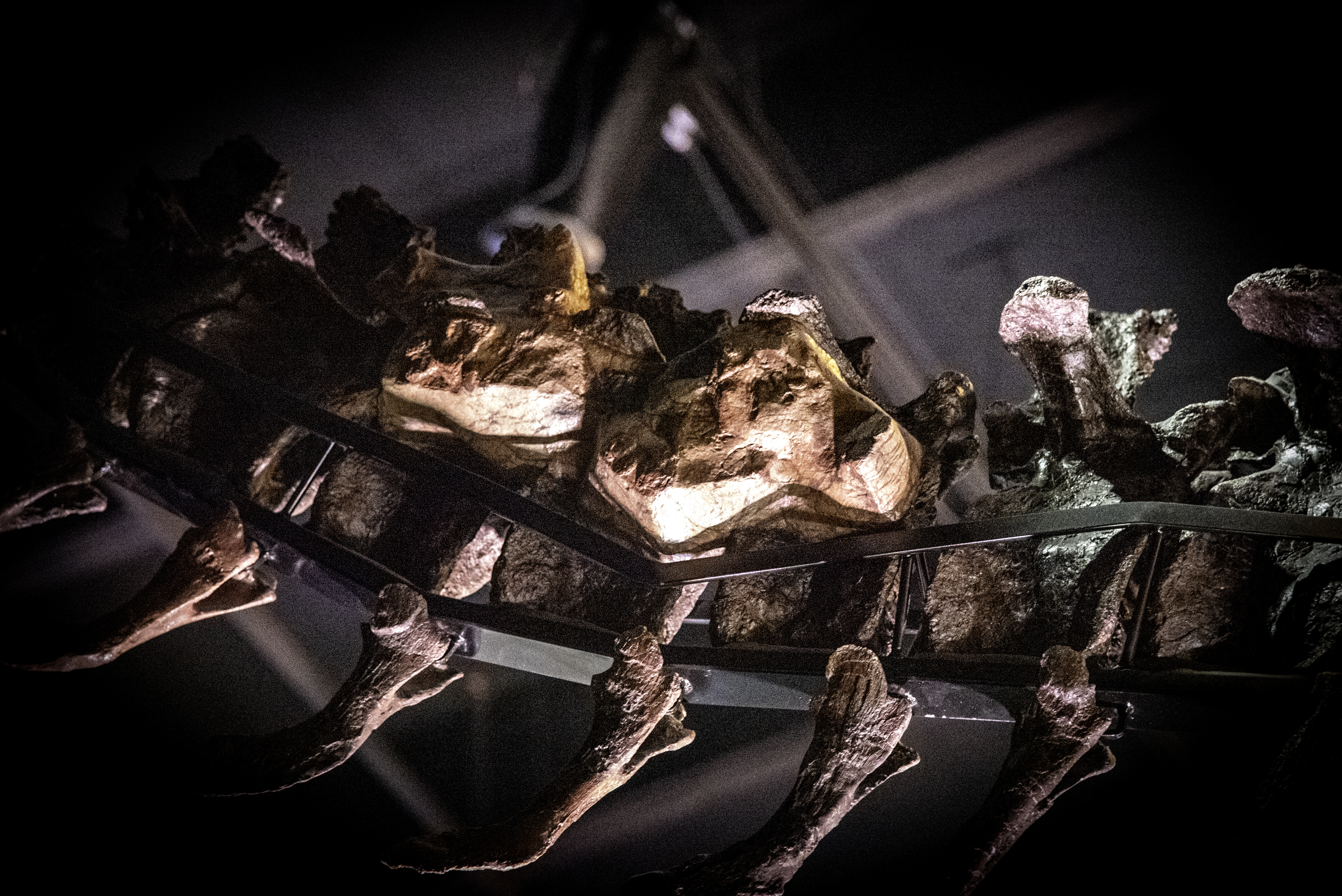
Fossilized skin impressions from the tail region of a Tyrannosaurus rex, Houston Museum of Natural Science

The discovery of feathered dinosaurs led to debate regarding whether, and to what extent, Tyrannosaurus might have been feathered. Filamentous structures, which are commonly recognized as the precursors of feathers, have been reported in the small-bodied, basal tyrannosauroid Dilong paradoxus from the Early Cretaceous Yixian Formation of China in 2004. Because integumentary impressions of larger tyrannosauroids known at that time showed evidence of scales, the researchers who studied Dilong speculated that insulating feathers might have been lost by larger species due to their smaller surface-to-volume ratio. The subsequent discovery of the giant species Yutyrannus huali, also from the Yixian, showed that even some large tyrannosauroids had feathers covering much of their bodies, casting doubt on the hypothesis that they were a size-related feature. A 2017 study reviewed known skin impressions of tyrannosaurids, including those of a Tyrannosaurus specimen nicknamed "Wyrex" (HMNS 2006.1743.01, formerly known as BHI 6230) which preserves patches of mosaic scales on the tail, hip, and neck. The study concluded that feather covering of large tyrannosaurids such as Tyrannosaurus was, if present, limited to the upper side of the trunk.

A conference abstract published in 2016 posited that theropods such as Tyrannosaurus had their upper teeth covered in lips, instead of bare teeth as seen in crocodilians. This was based on the presence of enamel, which according to the study needs to remain hydrated, an issue not faced by aquatic animals like crocodilians. However, there has been criticism where it favors the idea for lips, with the 2017 analytical study proposing that tyrannosaurids had large, flat scales on their snouts instead of lips, as modern crocodiles do. But crocodiles possess rather cracked keratinized skin, not flat scales; by observing the hummocky rugosity of tyrannosaurids, and comparing it to extant lizards, researchers have found that tyrannosaurids had squamose scales rather than a crocodillian-like skin.

In 2023, Cullen and colleagues supported the idea that theropods like tyrannosaurids had lips based on anatomical patterns, such as those of the foramina on their face and jaws, more similar to those of modern squamates such as monitor lizards or marine iguanas than those of modern crocodilians like alligators. Comparison of the teeth of Daspletosaurus and American alligators shows that the enamel of tyrannosaurids had no significant wear and that the teeth of modern crocodilians were eroded on the labial side and were substantially worn. This suggests that it is likely that theropod teeth were kept wet by lips. On the basis of the relationship between hydration and wear resistance, the authors argued that it is unlikely that the teeth of theropods, including tyrannosaurids, would have remained unworn when exposed for a long time, because it would have been hard to maintain hydration. The authors also performed regression analyses to demonstrate the relationship between tooth height and skull length, and found that varanids like the crocodile monitor had substantially greater ratios of tooth height to skull length than those of Tyrannosaurus, indicating that the teeth of theropods were not too big to be covered by extraoral tissues when the mouth was closed.

=== Sexual dimorphism ===
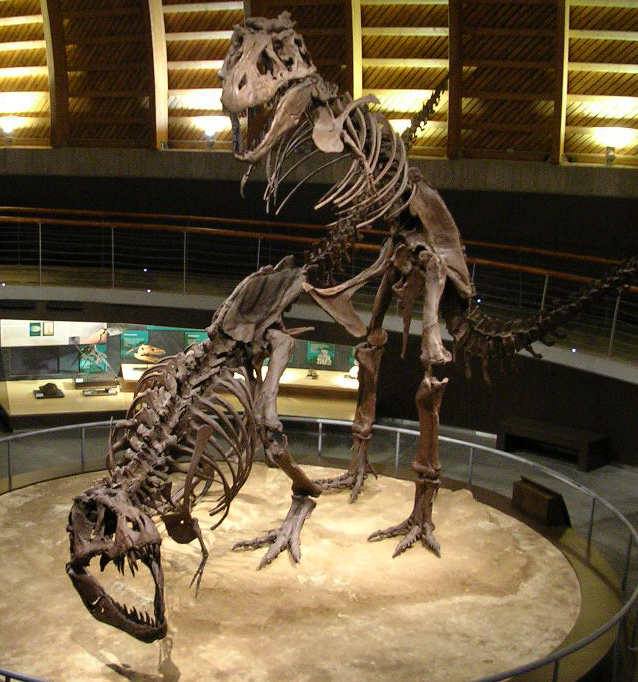
Skeleton casts mounted in a mating position, Jurassic Museum of Asturias

As the number of known specimens increased, scientists began to analyze the variation between individuals and discovered what appeared to be two distinct body types, or morphs, similar to some other theropod species. As one of these morphs was more solidly built, it was termed the 'robust' morph while the other was termed 'gracile'. Several morphological differences associated with the two morphs were used to analyze sexual dimorphism in T. rex, with the 'robust' morph usually suggested to be female. For example, the pelvis of several 'robust' specimens seemed to be wider, perhaps to allow the passage of eggs. It was also thought that the 'robust' morphology correlated with a reduced chevron on the first tail vertebra, also ostensibly to allow eggs to pass out of the reproductive tract, as had been erroneously reported for crocodiles.

In recent years, evidence for sexual dimorphism has been weakened. A 2005 study reported that previous claims of sexual dimorphism in crocodile chevron anatomy were in error, casting doubt on the existence of similar dimorphism between T. rex sexes. A full-sized chevron was discovered on the first tail vertebra of Sue, an extremely robust individual, indicating that this feature could not be used to differentiate the two morphs anyway. As T. rex specimens have been found from Saskatchewan to New Mexico, differences between individuals may be indicative of geographic variation rather than sexual dimorphism. The differences could also be age-related, with 'robust' individuals being older animals.

Only a single Tyrannosaurus specimen has been conclusively shown to belong to a specific sex. Examination of B-rex demonstrated the preservation of soft tissue within several bones. Some of this tissue has been identified as a medullary tissue, a specialized tissue grown only in modern birds as a source of calcium for the production of eggshell during ovulation. As only female birds lay eggs, medullary tissue is only found naturally in females, although males are capable of producing it when injected with female reproductive hormones like estrogen. This strongly suggests that B-rex was female and that she died during ovulation. Recent research has shown that medullary tissue is never found in crocodilians, which are thought to be the closest living relatives of dinosaurs. The shared presence of medullary tissue in birds and other theropod dinosaurs is further evidence of the close evolutionary relationship between the two.

=== Posture ===
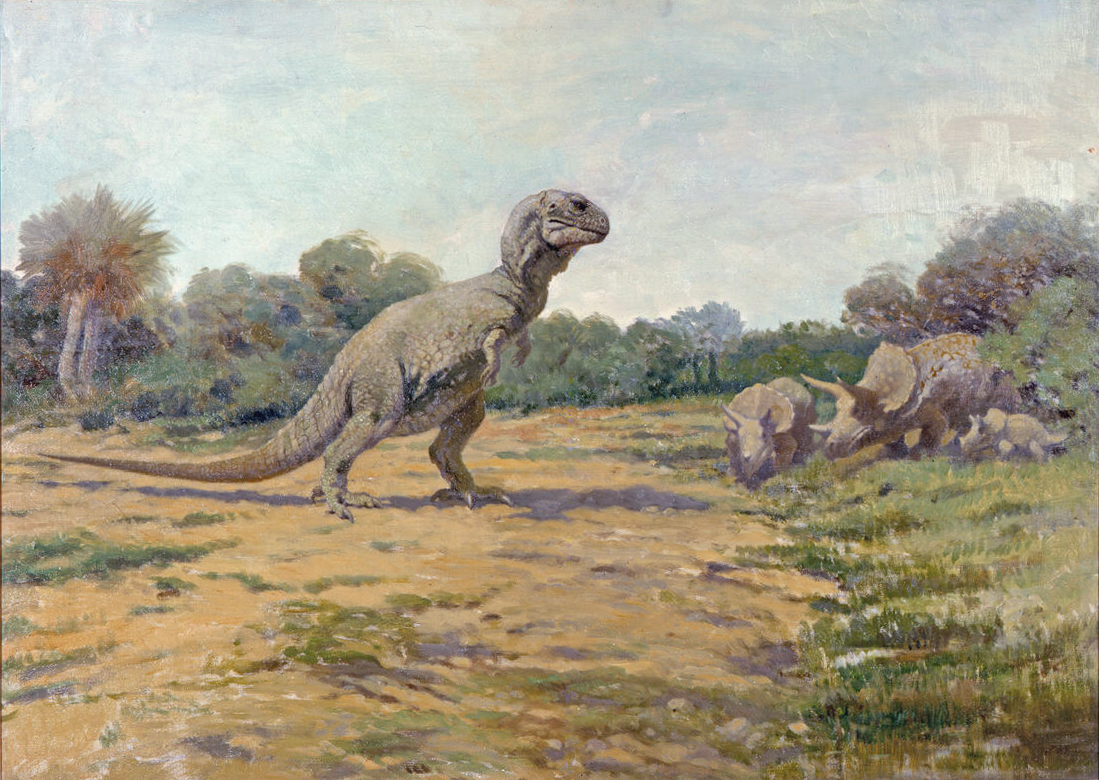
Outdated reconstruction (by Charles R. Knight), showing upright pose

Like many bipedal dinosaurs, T. rex was historically depicted as a 'living tripod', with the body at 45 degrees or less from the vertical and the tail dragging along the ground, similar to a kangaroo. This concept dates from Joseph Leidy's 1865 reconstruction of Hadrosaurus, the first to depict a dinosaur in a bipedal posture. In 1915, convinced that the creature stood upright, Henry Fairfield Osborn, former president of the American Museum of Natural History, further reinforced the notion in unveiling the first complete T. rex skeleton arranged this way. It stood in an upright pose for 77 years, until it was dismantled in 1992.

By 1970, scientists realized this pose was incorrect and could not have been maintained by a living animal, as it would have resulted in the dislocation or weakening of several joints, including the hips and the articulation between the head and the spinal column. The inaccurate AMNH mount inspired similar depictions in many films and paintings (such as Rudolph Zallinger's famous mural The Age of Reptiles in Yale University's Peabody Museum of Natural History) until the 1990s, when films such as Jurassic Park introduced a more accurate posture to the general public. Modern representations in museums, art, and film show T. rex with its body approximately parallel to the ground with the tail extended behind the body to balance the head.

To sit down, Tyrannosaurus may have settled its weight backwards and rested its weight on a pubic boot, the wide expansion at the end of the pubis in some dinosaurs. With its weight rested on the pelvis, it may have been free to move the hindlimbs. Getting back up again might have involved some stabilization from the diminutive forelimbs. The latter known as Newman's pushup theory has been debated. Nonetheless, Tyrannosaurus was probably able to get up if it fell, which only would have required placing the limbs below the center of gravity, with the tail as an effective counterbalance. Healed stress fractures in the forelimbs have been put forward both as evidence that the arms cannot have been very useful and as evidence that they were indeed used and acquired wounds, like the rest of the body.

=== Arms ===
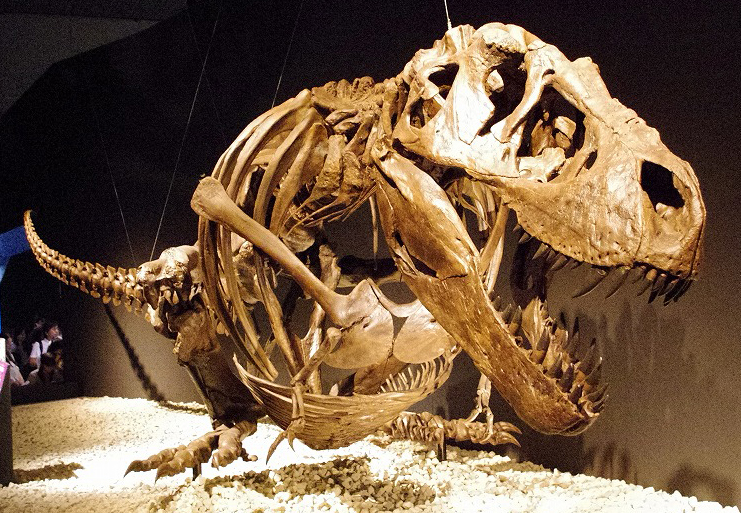
The forelimbs might have been used to help T. rex rise from a resting pose, as seen in this cast (Bucky specimen)

When T. rex was first discovered, the humerus was the only element of the forelimb known. For the initial mounted skeleton as seen by the public in 1915, Osborn substituted longer, three-fingered forelimbs like those of Allosaurus. A year earlier, Lawrence Lambe described the short, two-fingered forelimbs of the closely related Gorgosaurus. This strongly suggested that T. rex had similar forelimbs, but this hypothesis was not confirmed until the first complete T. rex forelimbs were identified in 1989, belonging to MOR 555 (the "Wankel rex"). The remains of Sue also include complete forelimbs. T. rex arms are very small relative to overall body size, measuring only 1 meter (3.3 ft) long, and some scholars have labelled them as vestigial. However, the bones show large areas for muscle attachment, indicating considerable strength. This was recognized as early as 1906 by Osborn, who speculated that the forelimbs may have been used to grasp a mate during copulation. Newman (1970) suggested that the forelimbs were used to assist Tyrannosaurus in rising from a prone position. Since then, other functions have been proposed, although some scholars find them implausible. Padian (2022) argued that the reduction of the arms in tyrannosaurids did not serve a particular function but was a secondary adaptation, stating that as tyrannosaurids developed larger and more powerful skulls and jaws, the arms got smaller to avoid being bitten or torn by other individuals, particularly during group feedings.

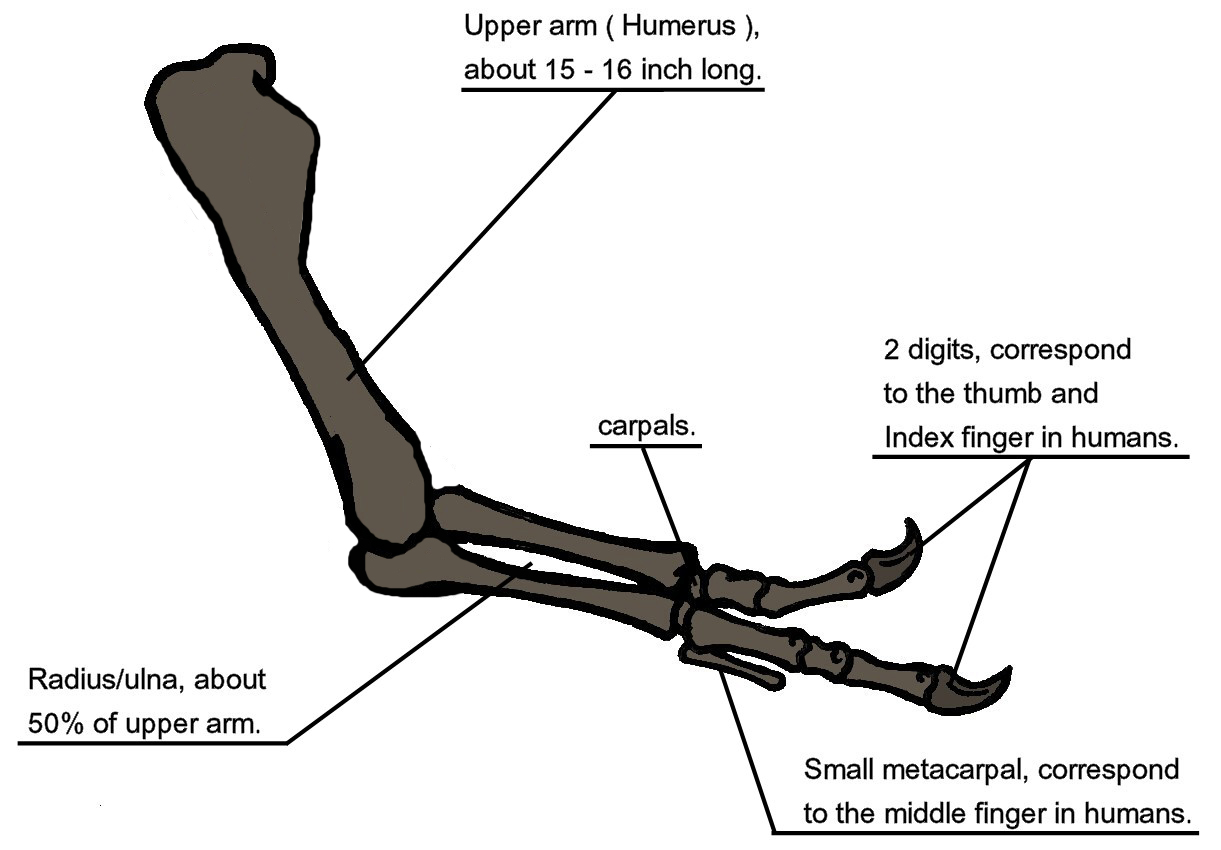
Diagram illustrating arm anatomy

Another possibility is that the forelimbs held struggling prey while it was killed by the tyrannosaur's enormous jaws. This hypothesis may be supported by biomechanical analysis. T. rex forelimb bones exhibit extremely thick cortical bone, which has been interpreted as evidence that they were developed to withstand heavy loads. The biceps brachii muscle of an adult T. rex was capable of lifting 199 kilograms (439 lb) by itself; other muscles such as the brachialis would work along with the biceps to make elbow flexion even more powerful. The M. biceps muscle of T. rex was 3.5 times as powerful as the human equivalent. A T. rex forearm had a limited range of motion, with the shoulder and elbow joints allowing only 40 and 45 degrees of motion, respectively. In contrast, the same two joints in Deinonychus allow up to 88 and 130 degrees of motion, respectively, while a human arm can rotate 360 degrees at the shoulder and move through 165 degrees at the elbow. The heavy build of the arm bones, strength of the muscles, and limited range of motion may indicate a system evolved to hold fast despite the stresses of a struggling prey animal. In the first detailed scientific description of Tyrannosaurus forelimbs, paleontologists Kenneth Carpenter and Matt Smith dismissed notions that the forelimbs were useless or that Tyrannosaurus was an obligate scavenger.

The idea that the arms served as weapons when hunting prey have also been proposed by Steven M. Stanley, who suggested that the arms were used for slashing prey, especially by using the claws to rapidly inflict long, deep gashes to its prey. This was dismissed by Padian, who argued that Stanley based his conclusion on incorrectly estimated forelimb size and range of motion.

=== Thermoregulation ===
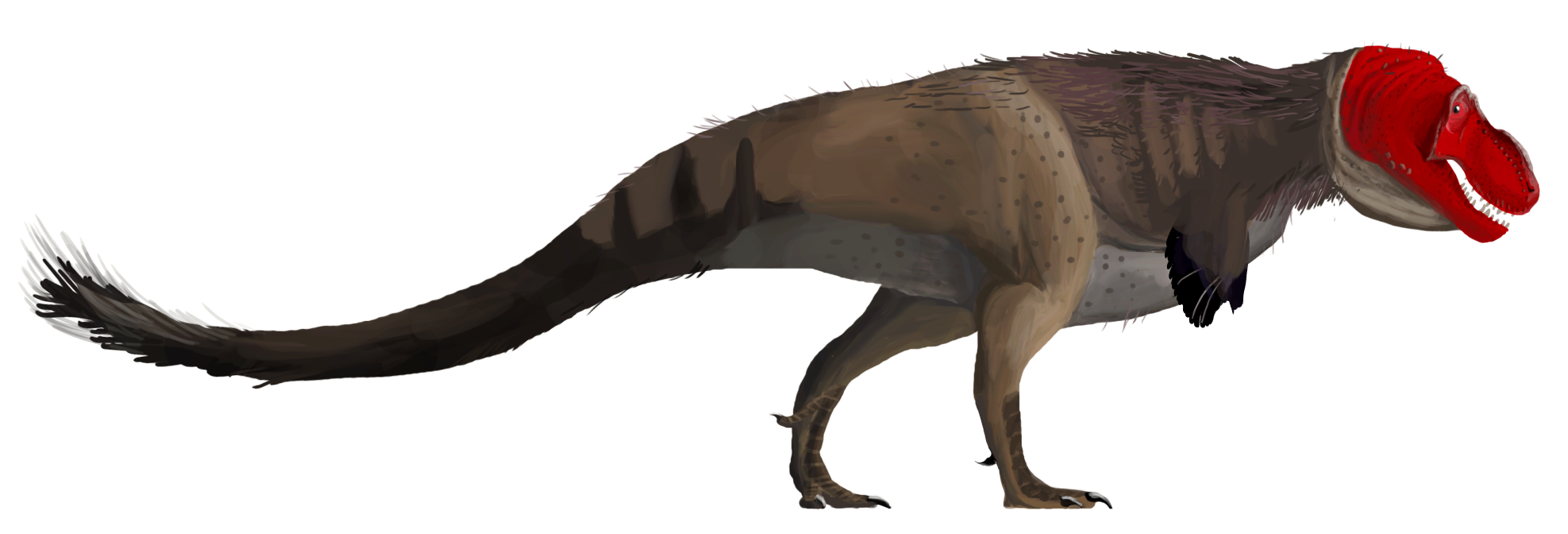
Restoration showing partial feathering

Tyrannosaurus, like most dinosaurs, was long thought to have an ectothermic ("cold-blooded") reptilian metabolism. The idea of dinosaur ectothermy was challenged by scientists like Robert T. Bakker and John Ostrom in the early years of the "dinosaur renaissance", beginning in the late 1960s. T. rex itself was claimed to have been endothermic ("warm-blooded"), implying a very active lifestyle. Since then, several paleontologists have sought to determine the ability of Tyrannosaurus to regulate its body temperature. Histological evidence of high growth rates in young T. rex, comparable to those of mammals and birds, may support the hypothesis of a high metabolism. Growth curves indicate that, as in mammals and birds, T. rex growth was limited mostly to immature animals, rather than the indeterminate growth seen in most other vertebrates.

Oxygen isotope ratios in fossilized bone are sometimes used to determine the temperature at which the bone was deposited, as the ratio between certain isotopes correlates with temperature. In one specimen, the isotope ratios in bones from different parts of the body indicated a temperature difference of no more than 4 to 5 °C (7 to 9 °F) between the vertebrae of the torso and the tibia of the lower leg. This small temperature range between the body core and the extremities was claimed by paleontologist Reese Barrick and geochemist William Showers to indicate that T. rex maintained a constant internal body temperature (homeothermy) and that it enjoyed a metabolism somewhere between ectothermic reptiles and endothermic mammals. Other scientists have pointed out that the ratio of oxygen isotopes in the fossils today does not necessarily represent the same ratio in the distant past, and may have been altered during or after fossilization (diagenesis). Barrick and Showers have defended their conclusions in subsequent papers, finding similar results in another theropod dinosaur from a different continent and tens of millions of years earlier in time (Giganotosaurus). Ornithischian dinosaurs also showed evidence of homeothermy, while varanid lizards from the same formation did not. In 2022, Wiemann and colleagues used a different approach—the spectroscopy of lipoxidation signals, which are byproducts of oxidative phosphorylation and correlate with metabolic rates—to show that various dinosaur genera including Tyrannosaurus had endothermic metabolisms, on par with that of modern birds and higher than that of mammals. They also suggested that such a metabolism was ancestrally common to all dinosaurs.

Even if T. rex does exhibit evidence of homeothermy, it does not necessarily mean that it was endothermic. Such thermoregulation may also be explained by gigantothermy, as in some living sea turtles. Similar to contemporary crocodilians, openings (dorsotemporal fenestrae) in the skull roofs of Tyrannosaurus may have aided thermoregulation. Isotopic analysis found T. rex had a body temperature of 36.3 °C (97.3 °F) ± 2.5 °C, suggesting it had an endothermic metabolism. Its endothermic metabolism suggests it could have inhabited cooler, higher latitude environments.

=== Soft tissue ===
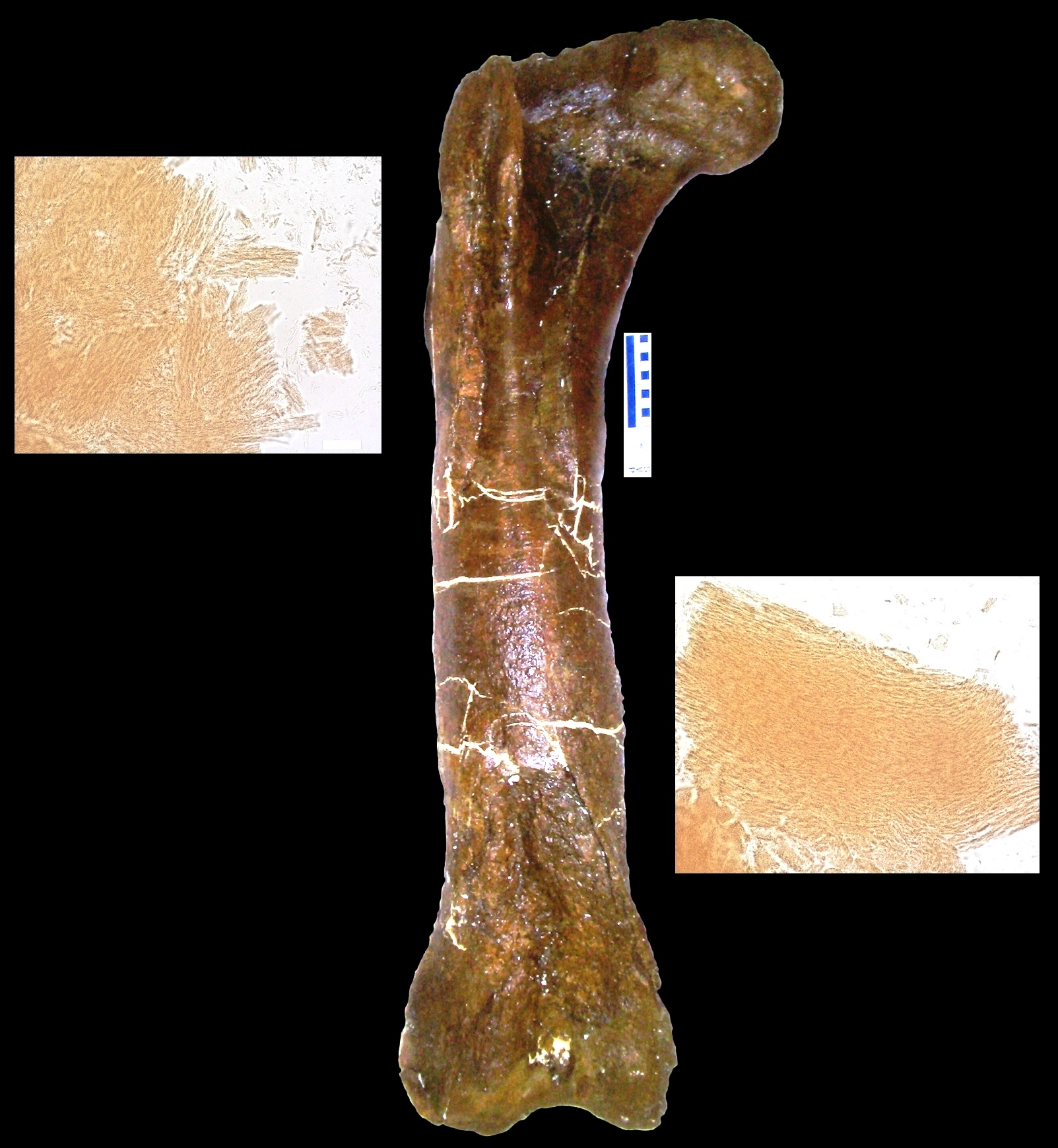
T. rex femur (MOR 1125) from which demineralized matrix and peptides (insets) were obtained

In the March 2005 issue of Science, Mary Higby Schweitzer of North Carolina State University and colleagues announced the recovery of soft tissue from the marrow cavity of a fossilized leg bone from a T. rex. The bone had been intentionally, though reluctantly, broken for shipping and then not preserved in the normal manner, specifically because Schweitzer was hoping to test it for soft tissue. Designated as the Museum of the Rockies specimen 1125, or MOR 1125, the dinosaur was previously excavated from the Hell Creek Formation. Flexible, bifurcating blood vessels and fibrous but elastic bone matrix tissue were recognized. In addition, microstructures resembling blood cells were found inside the matrix and vessels. The structures bear resemblance to ostrich blood cells and vessels. Whether an unknown process, distinct from normal fossilization, preserved the material, or the material is original, the researchers do not know, and they are careful not to make any claims about preservation. If it is found to be original material, any surviving proteins may be used as a means of indirectly guessing some of the DNA content of the dinosaurs involved, because each protein is typically created by a specific gene. The absence of previous finds may be the result of people assuming preserved tissue was impossible, therefore not looking. Since the first, two more tyrannosaurs and a hadrosaur have also been found to have such tissue-like structures. Research on some of the tissues involved has suggested that birds are closer relatives to tyrannosaurs than other modern animals. The original endogenous chemistry was also found in MOR 1125 based on preservation of elements associated with bone remodeling and redeposition (sulfur, calcium, zinc), which showed that the bone cortices are similar to those of extant birds.

In studies reported in Science in April 2007, Asara and colleagues concluded that seven traces of collagen proteins detected in purified T. rex bone most closely match those reported in chickens, followed by frogs and newts. The discovery of proteins from a creature tens of millions of years old, along with similar traces the team found in a mastodon bone at least 160,000 years old, upends the conventional view of fossils and may shift paleontologists' focus from bone hunting to biochemistry. Until these finds, most scientists presumed that fossilization replaced all living tissue with inert minerals. Paleontologist Hans Larsson of McGill University in Montreal, who was not part of the studies, called the finds "a milestone", and suggested that dinosaurs could "enter the field of molecular biology and really slingshot paleontology into the modern world".

The presumed soft tissue was called into question by Thomas Kaye of the University of Washington and his co-authors in 2008. They contend that what was really inside the tyrannosaur bone was slimy biofilm created by bacteria that coated the voids once occupied by blood vessels and cells. The researchers found that what previously had been identified as remnants of blood cells, because of the presence of iron, were actually framboids, microscopic mineral spheres bearing iron. They found similar spheres in a variety of other fossils from various periods, including an ammonite. In the ammonite, they found the spheres in a place where the iron they contain could not have had any relationship to the presence of blood. Schweitzer has strongly criticized Kaye's claims and argues that there is no reported evidence that biofilms can produce branching, hollow tubes like those noted in her study. San Antonio, Schweitzer and colleagues published an analysis in 2011 of what parts of the collagen had been recovered, finding that it was the inner parts of the collagen coil that had been preserved, as would have been expected from a long period of protein degradation. Other research challenges the identification of soft tissue as biofilm and confirms finding "branching, vessel-like structures" from within fossilized bone.

=== Speed ===
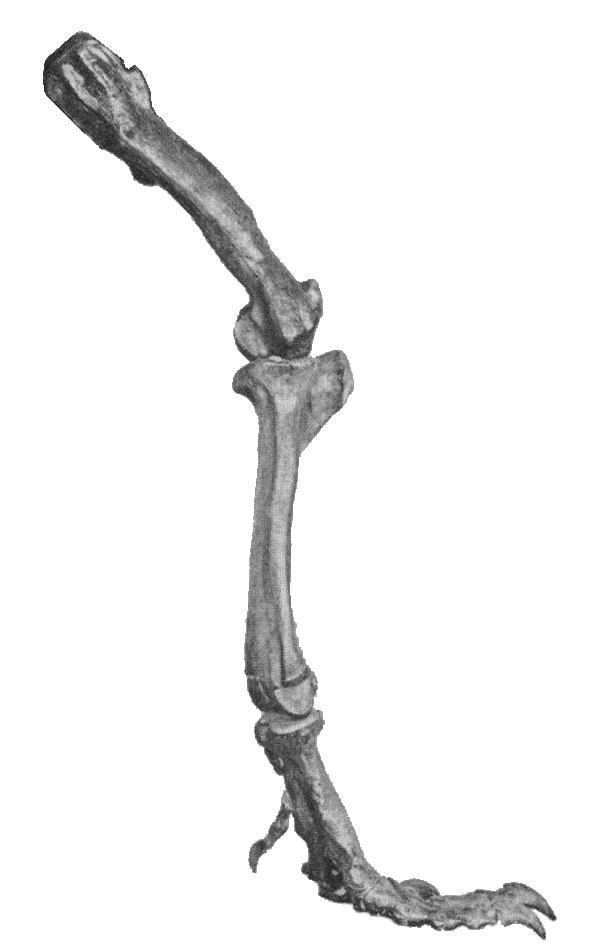
Skeletal anatomy of a T. rex right leg

Scientists have produced a wide range of possible maximum running speeds for Tyrannosaurus: mostly around 9 meters per second (32 km/h; 20 mph), but as low as 4.5–6.8 meters per second (16–24 km/h; 10–15 mph) and as high as 20 meters per second (72 km/h; 45 mph). According to John Hutchinson and colleagues, Tyrannosaurus was unlikely to run fast .

A 2002 report used a mathematical model (validated by applying it to three living animals: alligators, chickens, and humans; and eight more species, including emus and ostriches) to gauge the leg muscle mass needed for fast running (over 40 km/h or 25 mph). Scientists who think that Tyrannosaurus was able to run point out that hollow bones and other features that would have lightened its body may have kept adult weight to a mere 4.5 metric tons (5.0 short tons) or so, or that other animals like ostriches and horses with long, flexible legs are able to achieve high speeds through slower but longer strides. Proposed top speeds exceeded 40 kilometers per hour (25 mph) for Tyrannosaurus, but were deemed infeasible because they would require exceptional leg muscles of approximately 40–86% of total body mass. Even moderately fast speeds would have required large leg muscles. If the muscle mass was less, only 18 kilometers per hour (11 mph) for walking or jogging would have been possible. Holtz noted that tyrannosaurids and some closely related groups had significantly longer distal hindlimb components (shin plus foot plus toes) relative to the femur length than most other theropods, and that tyrannosaurids and their close relatives had a tightly interlocked metatarsus (foot bones). The third metatarsal was squeezed between the second and fourth metatarsals to form a single unit called an arctometatarsus. This ankle feature may have helped the animal to run more efficiently. Together, these leg features allowed Tyrannosaurus to transmit locomotory forces from the foot to the lower leg more effectively than in earlier theropods.

Additionally, a 2020 study indicates that Tyrannosaurus and other tyrannosaurids were exceptionally efficient walkers. Studies by Dececchi et al., compared the leg proportions, body mass, and the gaits of more than 70 species of theropod dinosaurs including Tyrannosaurus and its relatives. The research team then applied a variety of methods to estimate each dinosaur's top speed when running as well as how much energy each dinosaur expended while moving at more relaxed speeds such as when walking. Among smaller to medium-sized species such as dromaeosaurids, longer legs appear to be an adaptation for faster running, in line with previous results by other researchers. But for theropods weighing over 1,000 kg (2,200 lb), top running speed is limited by body size, so longer legs instead were found to have correlated with low-energy walking. The results further indicate that smaller theropods evolved long legs as a means to both aid in hunting and escape from larger predators while larger theropods that evolved long legs did so to reduce the energy costs and increase foraging efficiency, as they were freed from the demands of predation pressure due to their role as apex predators. Compared to more basal groups of theropods in the study, tyrannosaurs like Tyrannosaurus itself showed a marked increase in foraging efficiency due to reduced energy expenditures during hunting or scavenging. This in turn likely resulted in tyrannosaurs having a reduced need for hunting forays and requiring less food to sustain themselves as a result. Additionally, the research, in conjunction with studies that show tyrannosaurs were more agile than other large-bodied theropods, indicates they were quite well-adapted to a long-distance stalking approach followed by a quick burst of speed to go for the kill. Analogies can be noted between tyrannosaurids and modern wolves as a result, supported by evidence that at least some tyrannosaurids were hunting in group settings.

A study published in 2021 by Pasha van Bijlert et al., calculated the preferred walking speed of Tyrannosaurus, reporting a speed of 1.28 meters per second (4.6 km/h; 2.9 mph). While walking, animals reduce their energy expenditure by choosing certain step rhythms at which their body parts resonate. The same would have been true for dinosaurs, but previous studies did not fully account for the impact the tail had on their walking speeds. According to the authors, when a dinosaur walked, its tail would slightly sway up and down with each step as a result of the interspinous ligaments suspending the tail. Like rubber bands, these ligaments stored energy when they are stretched due to the swaying of the tail. Using a 3-D model of Tyrannosaurus specimen Trix, muscles and ligaments were reconstructed to simulate the tail movements. This results in a rhythmic, energy-efficient walking speed for Tyrannosaurus similar to that seen in living animals such as humans, ostriches and giraffes.

A 2017 study estimated the top running speed of Tyrannosaurus as 17 mph (27 km/h), speculating that Tyrannosaurus exhausted its energy reserves long before reaching top speed, resulting in a parabola-like relationship between size and speed. Another 2017 study hypothesized that an adult Tyrannosaurus was incapable of running due to high skeletal loads. Using a calculated weight estimate of 7 tons, the model showed that speeds above 11 mph (18 km/h) would have probably shattered the leg bones of Tyrannosaurus. The finding may mean that running was also not possible for other giant theropod dinosaurs like Giganotosaurus, Mapusaurus and Acrocanthosaurus. However, studies by Eric Snively and colleagues, published in 2019 indicate that Tyrannosaurus and other tyrannosaurids were more maneuverable than allosauroids and other theropods of comparable size due to low rotational inertia compared to their body mass combined with large leg muscles. As a result, it is hypothesized that Tyrannosaurus was capable of making relatively quick turns and could likely pivot its body more quickly when close to its prey, or that while turning, the theropod could "pirouette" on a single planted foot while the alternating leg was held out in a suspended swing during a pursuit. The results of this study potentially could shed light on how agility could have contributed to the success of tyrannosaurid evolution. In 2026, Boeye and colleagues analyzed the foot biomechanics of T. rex and determined that its foot likely functioned similarly to modern birds. This may have resulted in shorter stride lengths, higher stride frequencies, and a somewhat elevated top speed.

=== Footprints ===
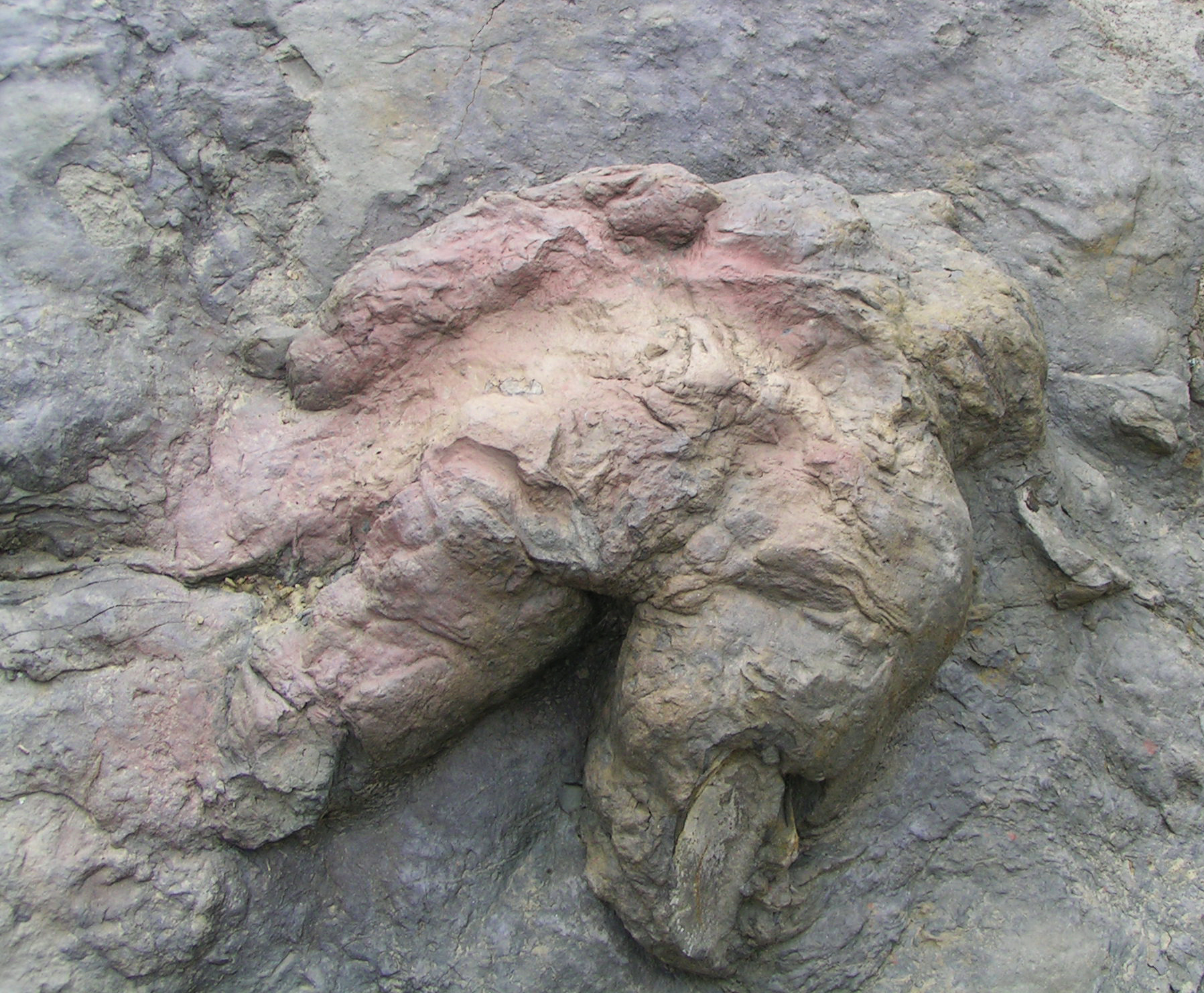
Excavation of the first Tyrannosaurus trackway in 2025 (top) and Tyrannosaurus track discovered in 1983 in New Mexico (bottom)

Several large fossil tracks were probably made by Tyrannosaurus, as the latter is the only theropod known from the Maastrichtian of North America large enough to possibly have made them. The first convincing Tyrannosaurus track was discovered in the Raton Formation of northern New Mexico in 1983. This track is 86 cm (34 in) in length and preserves the three main toes (digits two to four) as well as the much smaller hallux (the first digit). In 1994, the track was described as a new ichnogenus (a name that only applies to trace fossils) named Tyrannosauripus (meaning "pertaining to the foot of Tyrannosaurus"). Another large, 72 long track lacking the hallux was reported from the Hell Creek Formation in 2008 and likewise attributed to Tyrannosaurus. Other smaller tracks and trackways might have been made by sub-adult Tyrannosaurus or Nanotyrannus. In 2025, the first probable Tyrannosaurus trackway, consisting of four consecutive tracks, was discovered. Found in the Hell Creek Formation of North Dakota, the individual tracks are up to 1 m (3 ft 3 in) in length. The stride length (the distance between two successive tracks of the same foot) is about 4 m (13 ft), suggesting a walking speed of roughly 5–7 km/h (3.1–4.3 mph). In autumn 2026, three of the tracks were flown out of the quarry by helicopter and put on display at the Denver Museum of Nature and Science.

=== Brain and senses ===
A study conducted by Lawrence Witmer and Ryan Ridgely of Ohio University found that Tyrannosaurus shared the heightened sensory abilities of other coelurosaurs, highlighting relatively rapid and coordinated eye and head movements; an enhanced ability to sense low frequency sounds, which would allow tyrannosaurs to track prey movements from long distances; and an enhanced sense of smell. A study published by Kent Stevens concluded that Tyrannosaurus had keen vision. By applying modified perimetry to facial reconstructions of several dinosaurs including Tyrannosaurus, the study found that Tyrannosaurus had a binocular range of 55 degrees, surpassing that of modern hawks. Stevens estimated that Tyrannosaurus had 13 times the visual acuity of a human and surpassed the visual acuity of an eagle, which is 3.6 times that of a person. Stevens estimated a limiting far point (that is, the distance at which an object can be seen as separate from the horizon) as far as 6 km (3.7 mi) away, which is greater than the 1.6 km (1 mi) that a human can see.

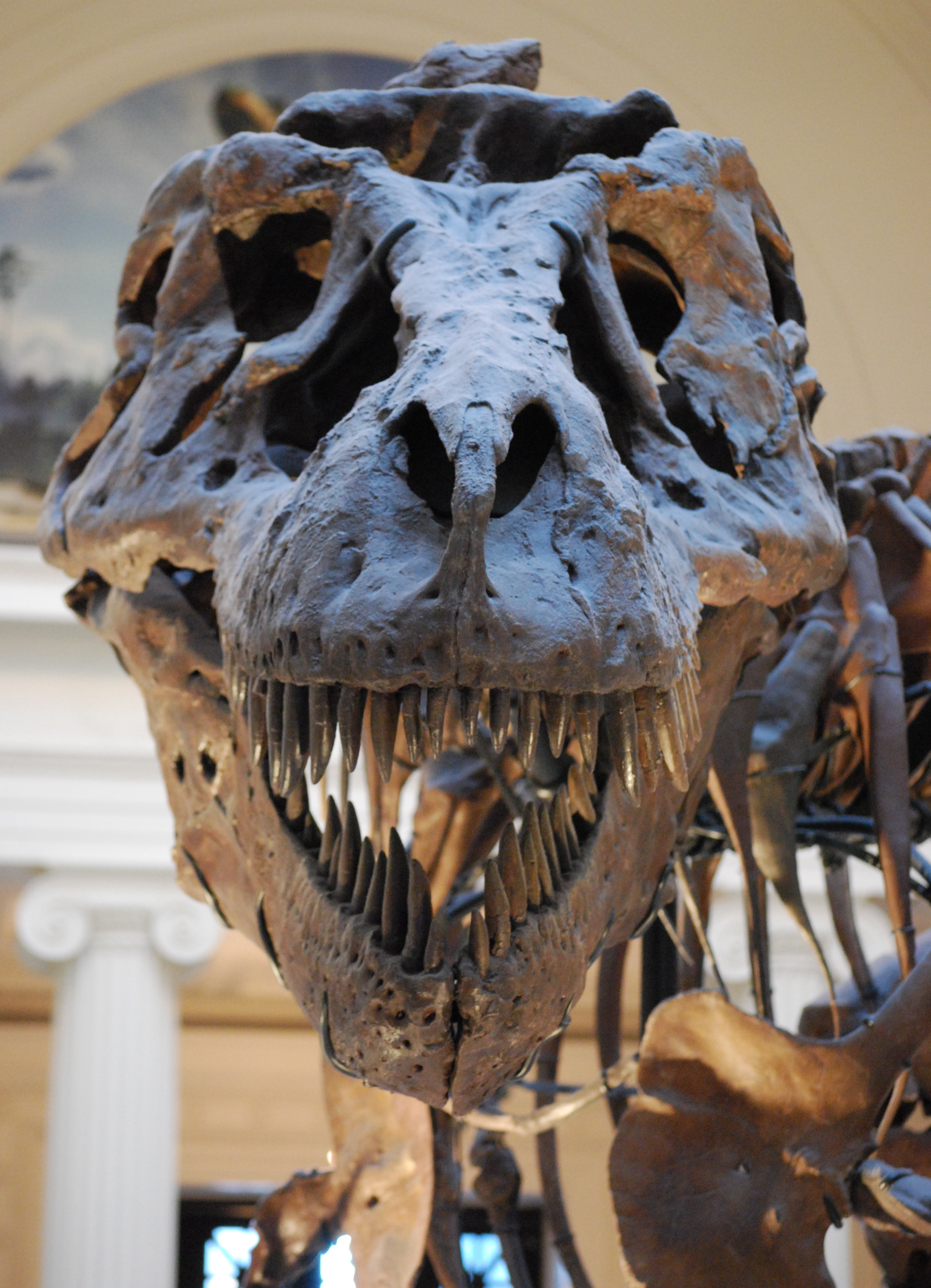
The eye-sockets faced mainly forwards, giving it good binocular vision (reconstructed skull of the Sue specimen; the original was partly crushed and broken).

Thomas Holtz Jr. would note that high depth perception of Tyrannosaurus may have been due to the prey it had to hunt, noting that it had to hunt ceratopsians such as Triceratops, ankylosaurs such as Ankylosaurus, and hadrosaurs. He would suggest that this made precision more crucial for Tyrannosaurus enabling it to, "get in, get that blow in and take it down." In contrast, Acrocanthosaurus had limited depth perception because they hunted large sauropods, which were relatively rare during the time of Tyrannosaurus.

Though no Tyrannosaurus scleral ring has been found, Kenneth Carpenter estimated its size based on that of Gorgosaurus. The inferred scleral ring for the Stan specimen is ~7 cm (2.8 in) in diameter with an internal aperture diameter of ~3.5 cm (1.4 in). Based on eye proportions in living reptiles, this implies a pupil diameter of about 2.5 cm (0.98 in), an iris diameter about that of the scleral ring, and an eyeball diameter of 11–12 cm (4.3–4.7 in). Carpenter also estimated an eyeball depth of ~7.7–9.6 cm (3.0–3.8 in). Based on these calculations, the f-number for Stan's eye is 3–3.8; since diurnal animals have f-numbers of 2.1 or higher, this would indicate that Tyrannosaurus had poor low-light vision and hunted during the day.

Tyrannosaurus had very large olfactory bulbs and olfactory nerves relative to their brain size, the organs responsible for a heightened sense of smell. This suggests that the sense of smell was highly developed, and implies that tyrannosaurs could detect carcasses by scent alone across great distances. The sense of smell in tyrannosaurs may have been comparable to modern vultures, which use scent to track carcasses for scavenging. Research on the olfactory bulbs has shown that T. rex had the most highly developed sense of smell of 21 sampled non-avian dinosaur species.

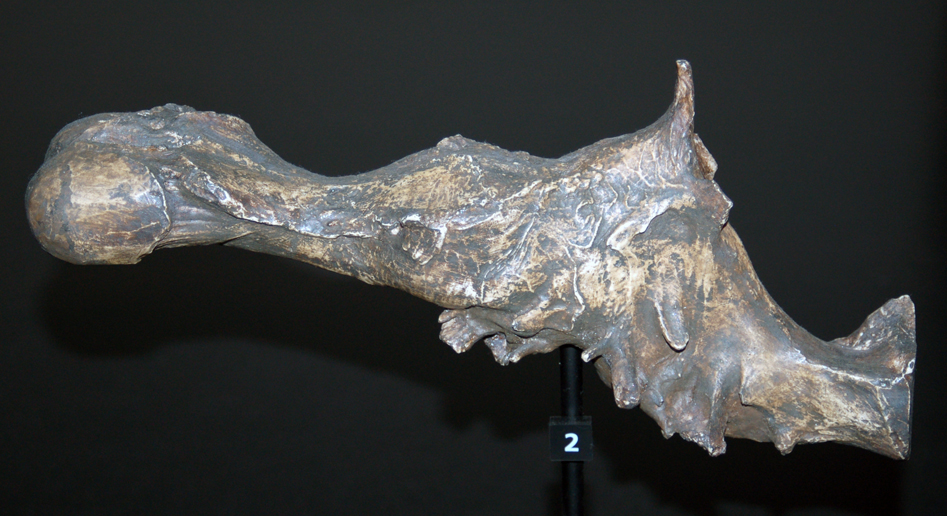
Cast of the braincase at the Australian Museum, Sydney

Somewhat unusually among theropods, T. rex had a very long cochlea. The length of the cochlea is often related to hearing acuity, or at least the importance of hearing in behavior, implying that hearing was a particularly important sense to tyrannosaurs. Specifically, data suggests that T. rex heard best in the low-frequency range, and that low-frequency sounds were an important part of tyrannosaur behavior. A 2017 study by Thomas Carr and colleagues found that the snout of tyrannosaurids was highly sensitive, based on a high number of small openings in the facial bones of the related Daspletosaurus that contained sensory neurons. The study speculated that tyrannosaurs might have used their sensitive snouts to measure the temperature of their nests and to gently pick up eggs and hatchlings, as seen in modern crocodilians. Another study published in 2021 further suggests that Tyrannosaurus had an acute sense of touch, based on neurovascular canals in the front of its jaws, which it could utilize to better detect and consume prey. The study, published by Kawabe and Hittori et al., suggests that Tyrannosaurus could also accurately sense slight differences in material and movement, allowing it to utilize different feeding strategies on different parts of its prey's carcasses depending on the situation. The sensitive neurovascular canals of Tyrannosaurus also likely were adapted to performing fine movements and behaviors such as nest building, parental care, and other social behavior such as intraspecific communication. The results of this study also align with results made in studying the related tyrannosaurid Daspletosaurus horneri and the allosauroid Neovenator, which have similar neurovascular adaptations, suggesting that the faces of theropods were highly sensitive to pressure and touch. However, a more recent study reviewing the evolution of the trigeminal canals among sauropsids notes that a much denser network of neurovascular canals in the snout and lower jaw is more commonly encountered in aquatic or semiaquatic taxa (e.g., Spinosaurus, Halszkaraptor, Plesiosaurus), and taxa that developed a rhamphotheca (e.g., Caenagnathasia), while the network of canals in Tyrannosaurus appears simpler, though still more derived than in most ornithischians, and overall terrestrial taxa such as tyrannosaurids and Neovenator may have had average facial sensitivity for non-edentulous terrestrial theropods, although further research is needed. The neurovascular canals in Tyrannosaurus may instead have supported soft tissue structures for thermoregulation or social signaling, the latter of which could be confirmed by the fact that the neurovascular network of canals may have changed during ontogeny.

A study by Grant R. Hurlburt, Ryan C. Ridgely and Lawrence Witmer obtained estimates for Encephalization Quotients (EQs), based on reptiles and birds, as well as estimates for the ratio of cerebrum to brain mass. The study concluded that Tyrannosaurus had the relatively largest brain of all adult non-avian dinosaurs with the exception of certain small maniraptoriforms (Bambiraptor, Troodon and Ornithomimus). The study found that Tyrannosaurus's relative brain size was still within the range of modern reptiles, being at most 2 standard deviations above the mean of non-avian reptile EQs. The estimates for the ratio of cerebrum mass to brain mass would range from 47.5 to 49.53 percent. According to the study, this is more than the lowest estimates for extant birds (44.6 percent), but still close to the typical ratios of the smallest sexually mature alligators which range from 45.9 to 47.9 percent. Other studies, such as those by Steve Brusatte, indicate the encephalization quotient of Tyrannosaurus was similar in range (2.0–2.4) to a chimpanzee (2.2–2.5), though this may be debatable as reptilian and mammalian encephalization quotients are not equivalent.

=== Social behavior ===
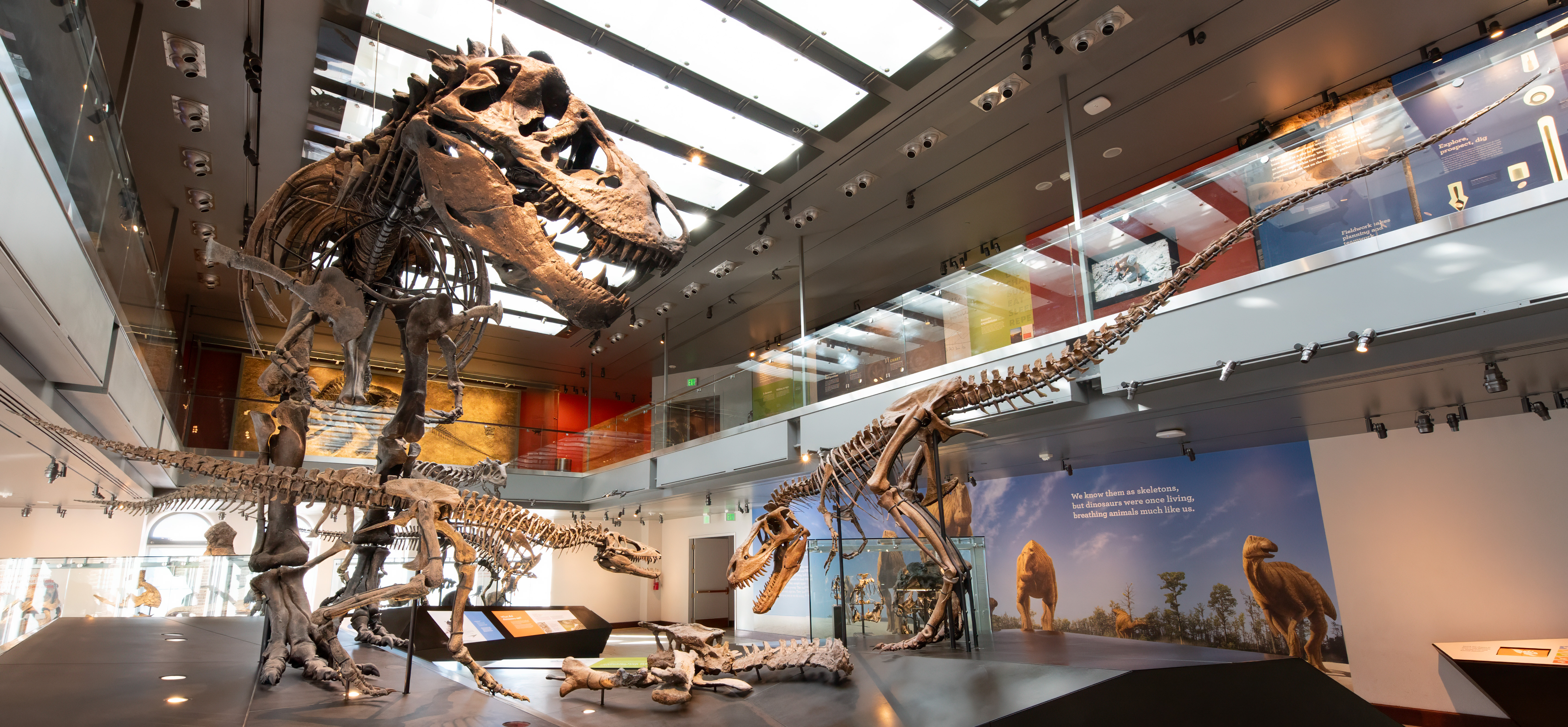
Mounted skeletons of different age groups (skeleton in lower left based on Stygivenator), Natural History Museum of Los Angeles County

Philip J. Currie suggested that Tyrannosaurus may have been pack hunters, comparing T. rex to related species Tarbosaurus bataar and Albertosaurus sarcophagus, citing fossil evidence that may indicate gregarious (describing animals that travel in herds or packs) behavior. A find in South Dakota where three T. rex skeletons were in close proximity may suggest the formation of a pack. Cooperative pack hunting may have been an effective strategy for subduing prey with advanced anti-predator adaptations which pose potential lethality such as Triceratops and Ankylosaurus.

Currie's pack-hunting T. rex hypothesis has been criticized for not having been peer-reviewed, but rather was discussed in a television interview and book called Dino Gangs. The Currie theory for pack hunting by T. rex is based mainly by analogy to a different species, Tarbosaurus bataar. Evidence of gregariousness in T. bataar itself has not been peer-reviewed, and to Currie's own admission, can only be interpreted with reference to evidence in other closely related species. According to Currie gregariousness in Albertosaurus sarcophagus is supported by the discovery of 26 individuals with varied ages in the Dry Island bonebed. He ruled out the possibility of a predator trap due to the similar preservation state of individuals and the near absence of herbivores.

Additional support of tyrannosaurid gregariousness can be found in fossilized trackways from the Upper Cretaceous Wapiti Formation of northeastern British Columbia, Canada, left by three tyrannosaurids traveling in the same direction. According to scientists assessing the Dino Gangs program, the evidence for pack hunting in Tarbosaurus and Albertosaurus is weak and based on group skeletal remains for which alternate explanations may apply (such as drought or a flood forcing dinosaurs to die together in one place). Others researchers have speculated that instead of large theropod social groups, some of these finds represent behavior more akin to Komodo dragon-like mobbing of carcasses, even going as far as to say true pack-hunting behavior may not exist in any non-avian dinosaurs due to its rarity in modern predators. Pathologies of Tyrannosaurus specimens have been suggested as evidence of conspecific attack, including "Wyrex" with a hole penetrating its jugual and severe trauma on its tail that shows signs of bone remodeling (not regrowth).

=== Diet and feeding behavior ===
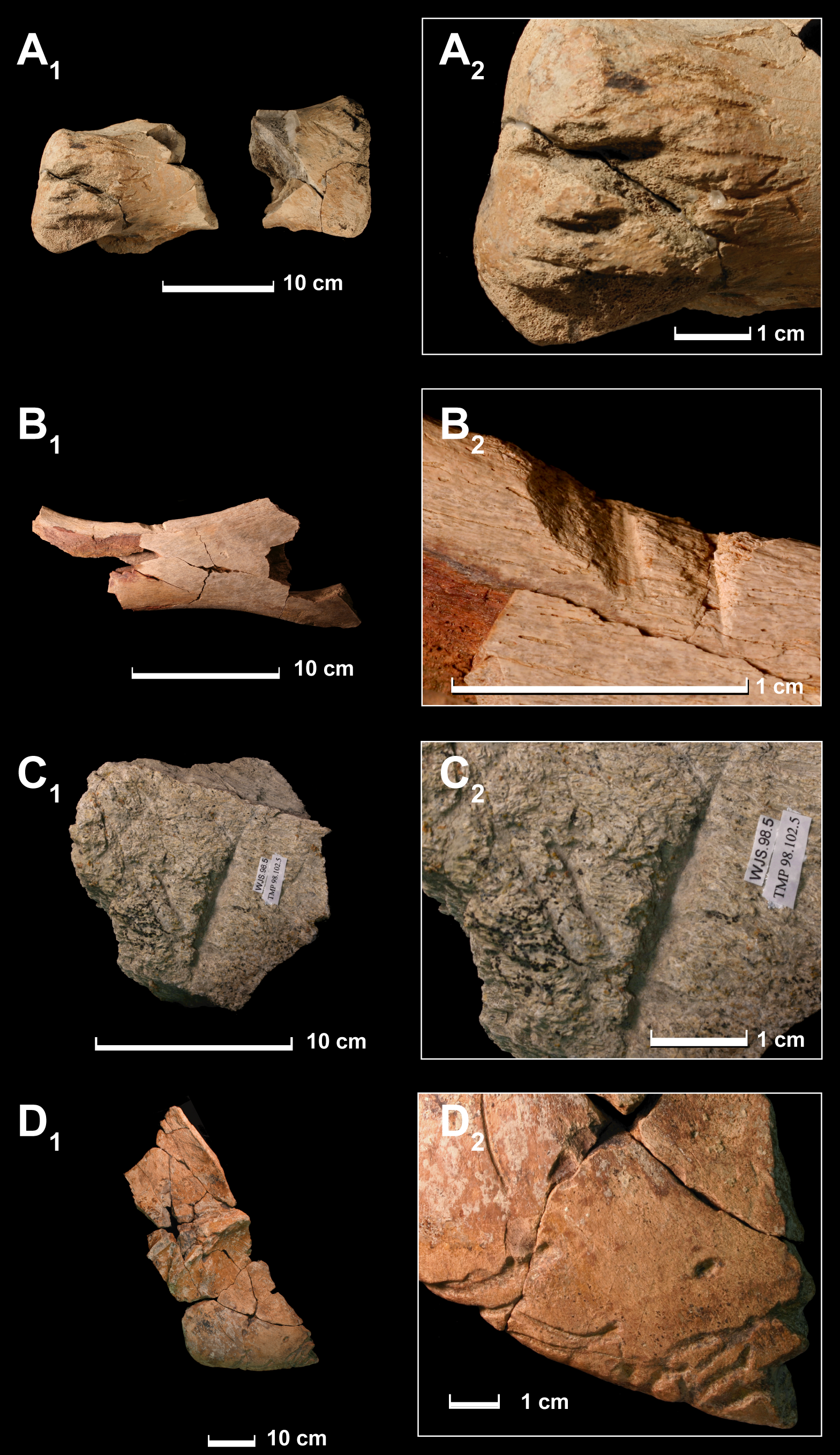
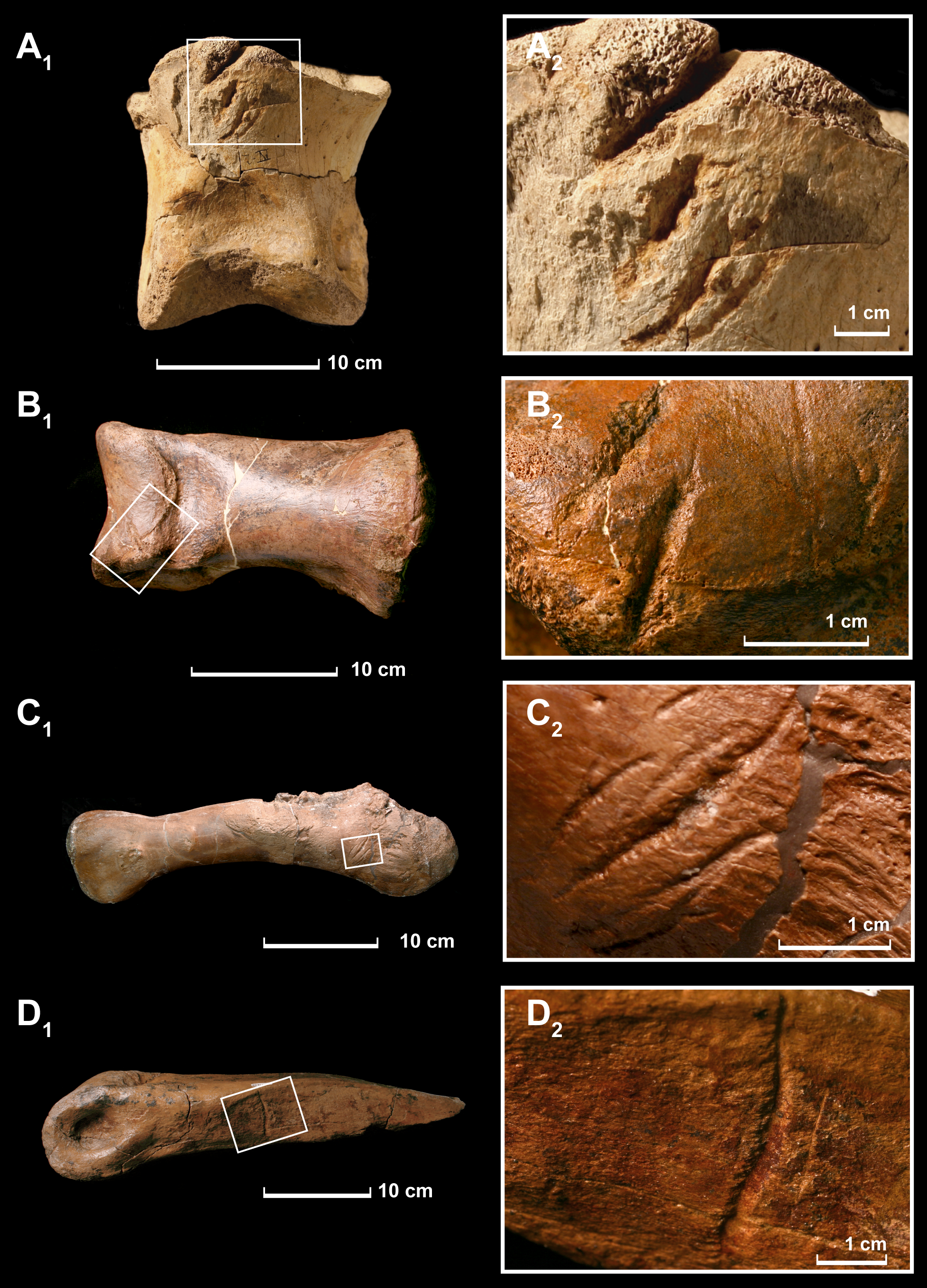
Tyrannosaurus tooth marks on bones of various herbivorous dinosaurs (left) as well as other Tyrannosaurus (right)

Most paleontologists have always accepted that Tyrannosaurus was an active predator and, like most large carnivores, would also opportunistically scavenge. By far the largest carnivore in its environment, T. rex was most likely an apex predator, preying upon hadrosaurs, armored herbivores like ceratopsians and ankylosaurs, and possibly sauropods (such as Alamosaurus). Enamel δ^{44/42}Ca values also suggest the possibility that T. rex occasionally fed on carcasses of marine reptiles and fish washed up on the shores of the Western Interior Seaway. A study in 2012 by Karl Bates and Peter Falkingham found that Tyrannosaurus had the most powerful bite of any terrestrial animal that has ever lived, finding an adult Tyrannosaurus could have exerted 35,000 to 57,000 N (7,868 to 12,814 lbf) of force in the back teeth. Even higher estimates were made by Mason B. Meers in 2003. This allowed it to crush bones during repetitive biting and fully consume the carcasses of large dinosaurs. Stephan Lautenschlager and colleagues calculated that Tyrannosaurus was capable of a maximum jaw gape of around 80 degrees, a necessary adaptation for a wide range of jaw angles to power the creature's strong bite.

A discredited fringe hypothesis that was never seriously considered was that Tyrannosaurus was an obligate scavenger. The argument originated in a 1917 study by Lambe which argued that large theropods were pure scavengers because Gorgosaurus teeth showed hardly any wear. This argument disregarded the fact that theropods rapidly replaced their teeth. Ever since the first discovery of Tyrannosaurus most scientists have agreed that it was an active predator, though like modern large predators it would readily scavenge or steal another predator's kill if it had the opportunity.

Paleontologist Jack Horner has been a major proponent of the view that Tyrannosaurus was not a predator at all but instead was an obligate scavenger. He has put forward arguments in the popular literature to support the pure scavenger hypothesis:

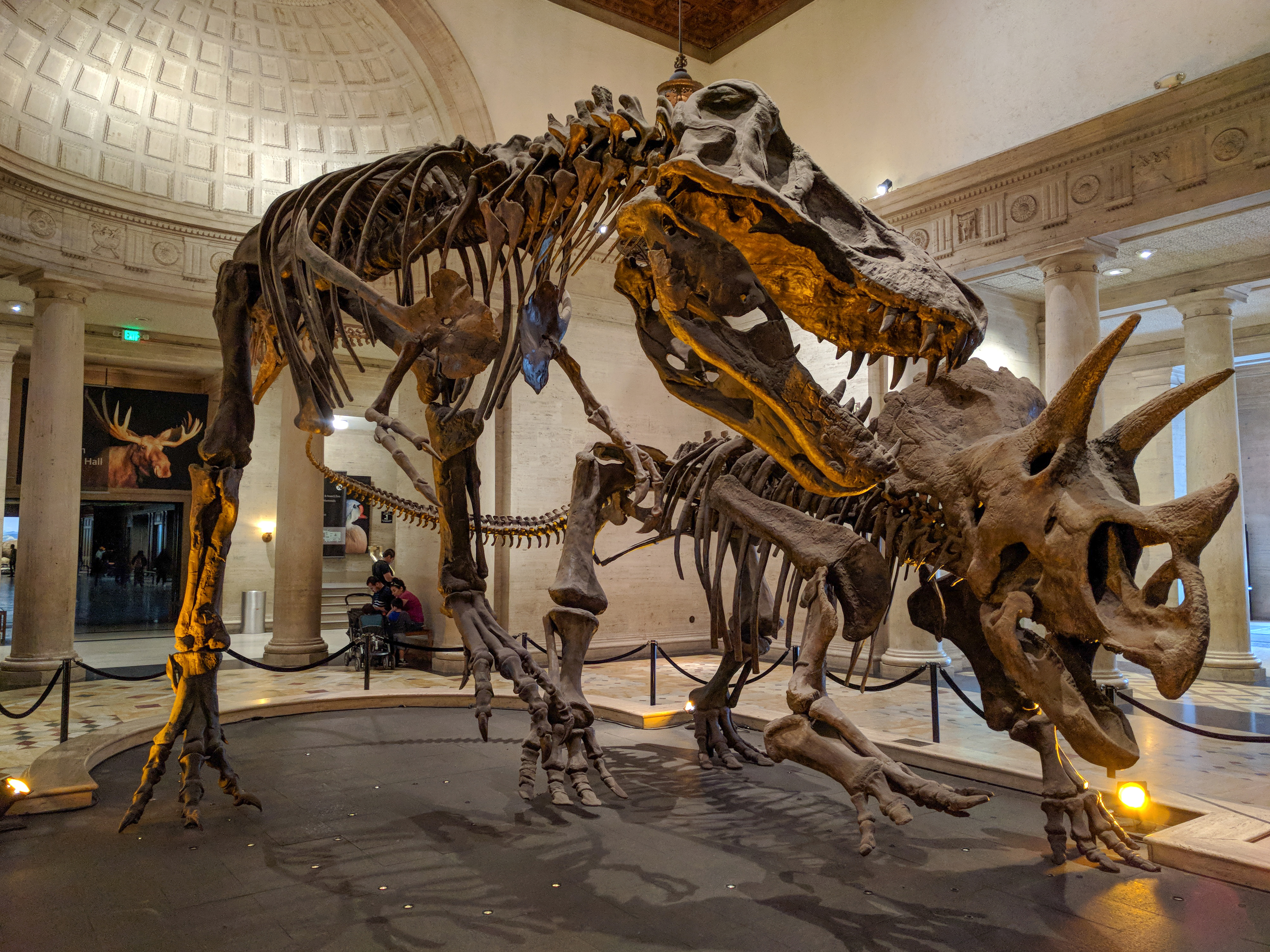
A Tyrannosaurus mounted next to a Triceratops at the Los Angeles Natural History Museum

- Tyrannosaur arms are short when compared to other known predators. Horner argues that the arms were too short to make the necessary gripping force to hold on to prey. Other paleontologists such as Thomas Holtz Jr. pointed out that there are plenty of modern-day predators that do not use their forelimbs to hunt such as wolves, hyenas, and secretary birds as well as other extinct animals thought to be predators that would not have used their forelimbs such as phorusrhacids.
- Tyrannosaurs had large olfactory bulbs and olfactory nerves (relative to their brain size). These suggest a highly developed sense of smell which could sniff out carcasses over great distances, as modern vultures do. Research on the olfactory bulbs of dinosaurs has shown that Tyrannosaurus had the most highly developed sense of smell of 21 sampled dinosaurs. However, good olfactory capabilities are also common in predatory animals, so this fails to provide evidence against predatory behavior.
- Tyrannosaur teeth could crush bone, and therefore could extract as much food (bone marrow) as possible from carcass remnants, usually the least nutritious parts. Karen Chin and colleagues have found bone fragments in coprolites (fossilized feces) that they attribute to tyrannosaurs, but point out that a tyrannosaur's teeth were not well adapted to systematically chewing bone like hyenas do to extract marrow.
- Since at least some of Tyrannosaurus's potential prey could move quickly, evidence that it walked instead of ran could indicate that it was a scavenger. However, most analyses indicate Tyrannosaurus, while slower than large modern terrestrial predators due to being far larger, was still faster than large hadrosaurs and ceratopsians.

Most evidence suggests hunting behavior in Tyrannosaurus. The eye sockets of tyrannosaurs are positioned so that the eyes would point forward, giving them binocular vision slightly better than that of modern hawks. It is not obvious why natural selection would have favored this long-term trend if tyrannosaurs had been pure scavengers, which would not have needed the advanced depth perception that stereoscopic vision provides. In modern animals, binocular vision is found mainly in predators (though not all predators have well-developed binocular vision).

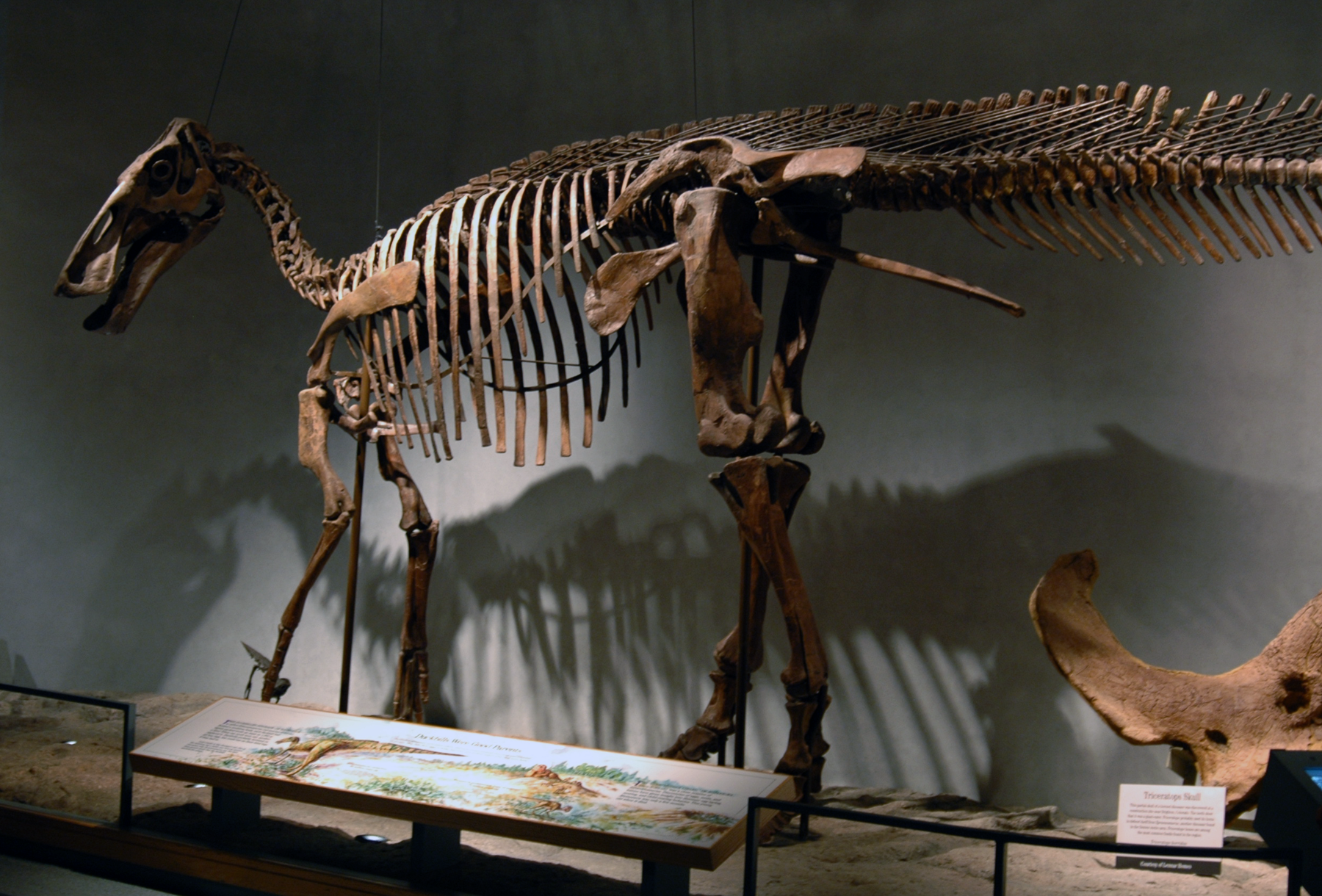
The damage to the tail vertebrae of this Edmontosaurus annectens skeleton (on display at the Denver Museum of Nature and Science) indicates that it may have been bitten by a Tyrannosaurus

There is at least one and possibly two fossil specimens of the hadrosaur Edmontosaurus annectens with healed caudal injuries caused by Tyrannosaurus bites made while the herbivore was alive. One pair of Edmontosaurus caudal (tail) vertebrae has the tip of an adult Tyrannosaurus tooth embedded in the bone, with evidence of new bone growth that wrapped around the tooth, showing that this individual had also survived a Tyrannosaurus attack. Another specimen of Edmontosaurus (in some newspapers it was misidentified as Hadrosaurus) from Montana showed healed supposed tyrannosaur-inflicted damage on its tail vertebrae where some of its caudal neural spines was mutilated; however, in this case the damage is ambiguous and not directly attributable to Tyrannosaurus. There is also evidence for an aggressive interaction between a Triceratops and a Tyrannosaurus in the form of partially healed tyrannosaur tooth marks on a Triceratops brow horn and squamosal (a bone of the neck frill); the bitten horn is also broken, with new bone growth after the break. It is not known what the exact nature of the interaction was, though: either animal could have been the aggressor. Since the Triceratops wounds healed, it is most likely that the Triceratops survived the encounter and managed to overcome the Tyrannosaurus. In a battle against a bull Triceratops, the Triceratops would likely defend itself by inflicting fatal wounds to the Tyrannosaurus using its sharp horns. Studies of Sue found a broken and healed fibula and tail vertebrae, scarred facial bones and a tooth from another Tyrannosaurus embedded in a neck vertebra, providing evidence for aggressive behavior.

In 1992, William Abler suggested that Tyrannosaurus may have had infectious saliva used to kill its prey. Abler observed that the serrations (tiny protuberances) on the cutting edges of the teeth are closely spaced, enclosing little chambers, which he argued trapped pieces of carcass with bacteria, giving Tyrannosaurus a deadly, infectious bite, as the Komodo dragon was mistakenly thought to have. Jack Horner and Don Lessem, in a 1993 popular book, questioned Abler's hypothesis, arguing that Tyrannosaurus's tooth serrations as more like cubes in shape than the serrations on a Komodo monitor's teeth, which are rounded. The basis for an infectious bite in Tyrannosaurus was further undermined when it was found Komodo dragons do not actually have an infectious bite nor hunt by biting prey and tracking it as it weakens.

Tyrannosaurus probably primarily processed carcasses with lateral shakes of the head, like crocodilians. The head was not as maneuverable as the skulls of allosauroids, due to flat joints of the neck vertebrae. Studies on hadrosaur vertebrae from the Hell Creek Formation that were punctured by the teeth of what appears to be a late-stage juvenile Tyrannosaurus indicate that despite lacking the bone-crushing adaptations of the adults, young individuals were still capable of using the same bone-puncturing feeding technique.

One study of Tyrannosaurus specimens with tooth marks in the bones attributable to the same genus was presented as evidence of cannibalism. Tooth marks in the humerus, foot bones and metatarsals may indicate opportunistic scavenging, rather than wounds caused by combat. Other tyrannosaurids may also have practiced cannibalism.

=== Parenting ===
While there is no direct evidence of Tyrannosaurus raising their young (given the rarity of juvenile and nest Tyrannosaur fossils), it has been suggested that like its closest living relatives, birds and crocodiles, Tyrannosaurus may have protected and fed its young. Crocodilians and birds are often suggested by some paleontologists to be modern analogues for dinosaur parenting. Direct evidence of parental behavior exists in other dinosaurs such as Maiasaura peeblesorum, the first dinosaur to have been discovered to raise its young, as well as more closely related Oviraptorids, the latter suggesting parental behavior in theropods. Some very young specimens assigned to Tyrannosaurus rex suggest that, although the species may have provided parental care, it was likely limited.

=== Pathology ===
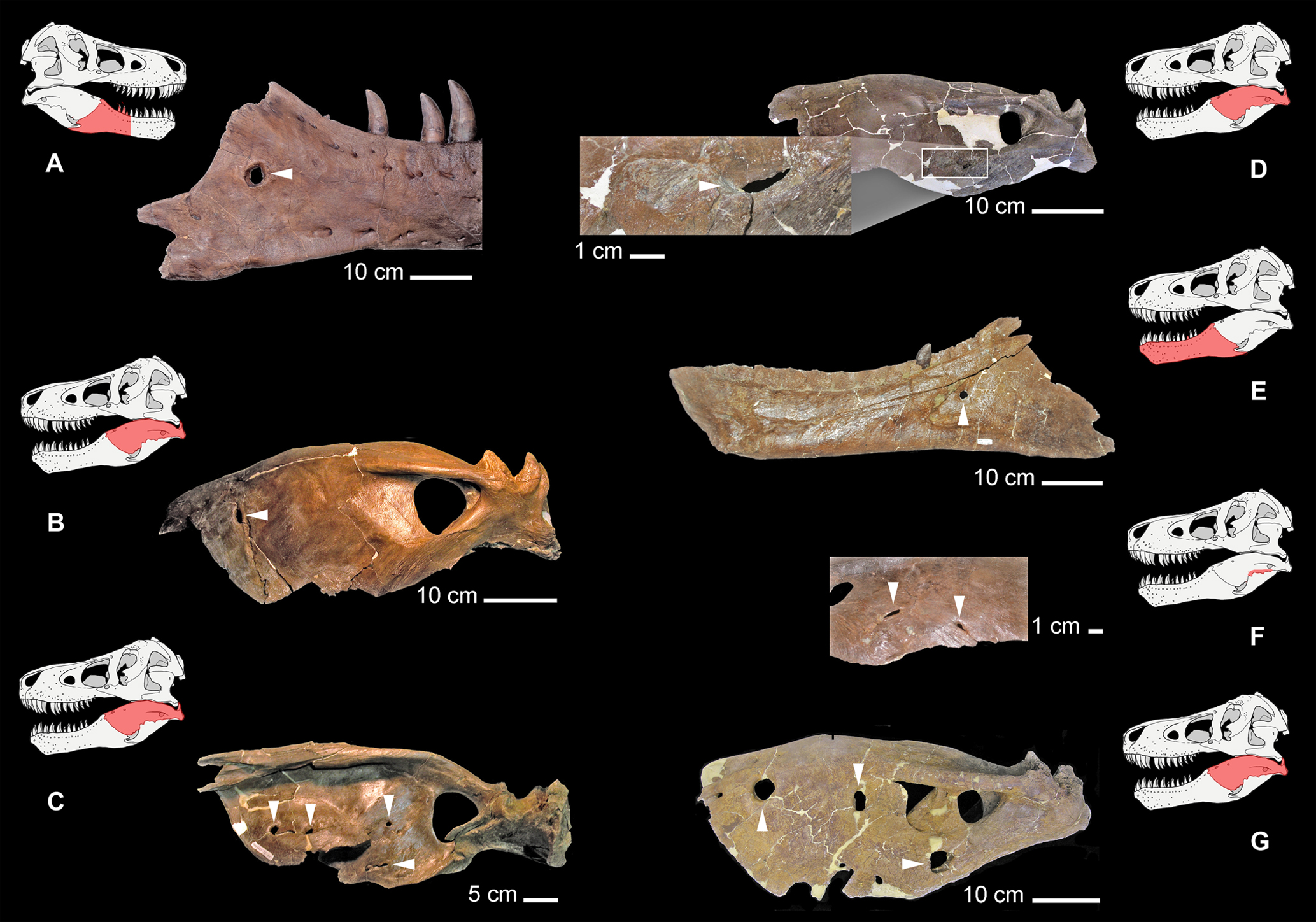
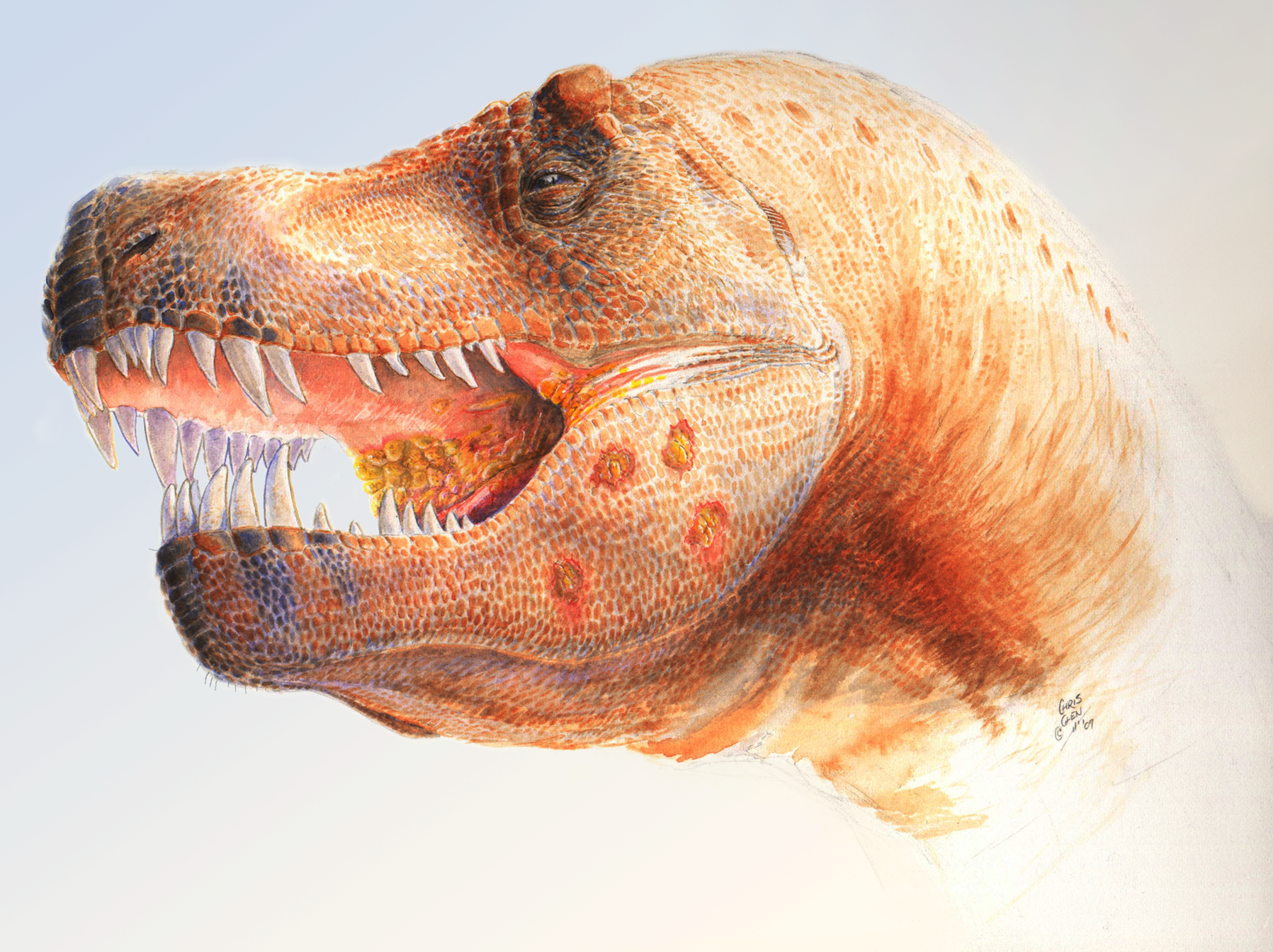
Jaw bones (top) and life restoration showing injuries caused by either parasite infections or bites

In 2001, Bruce Rothschild and others published a study examining evidence for stress fractures and tendon avulsions in theropod dinosaurs and the implications for their behavior. Since stress fractures are caused by repeated trauma rather than singular events they are more likely to be caused by regular behavior than other types of injuries. Of the 81 Tyrannosaurus foot bones examined in the study, one was found to have a stress fracture, while none of the 10 hand bones were found to have stress fractures. The researchers found tendon avulsions only among Tyrannosaurus and Allosaurus. An avulsion injury left a divot on the humerus of Sue the T. rex, apparently located at the origin of the deltoid or teres major muscles. The presence of avulsion injuries being limited to the forelimb and shoulder in both Tyrannosaurus and Allosaurus suggests that theropods may have had a musculature more complex than and functionally different from those of birds. The researchers concluded that Sue's tendon avulsion was probably obtained from struggling prey. The presence of stress fractures and tendon avulsions, in general, provides evidence for a "very active" predation-based diet rather than obligate scavenging.

A 2009 study showed that smooth-edged holes in the skulls of several specimens might have been caused by Trichomonas-like parasites that commonly infect birds. According to the study, seriously infected individuals, including "Sue" and MOR 980 ("Peck's Rex"), might therefore have died from starvation after feeding became increasingly difficult. Previously, these holes had been explained by the bacterious bone infection Actinomycosis or by intraspecific attacks. A subsequent study found that while trichomoniasis has many attributes of the model proposed, the observed sharp margins with little reactive bone shown by the radiographs of Trichomonas-infected birds are dissimilar to the reactive bone seen in the affected T. rex specimens. Also, trichomoniasis can be very rapidly fatal in birds (14 days or less) albeit in its milder form, and this suggests that if a Trichomonas-like protozoan is the culprit, trichomoniasis was less acute in its non-avian dinosaur form during the Late Cretaceous. Finally, the relative size of this type of lesions is much larger in small bird throats, and may not have been enough to choke a T. rex. A more recent study examining the pathologies concluded that the osseous alteration observed most closely resembles those around healing human cranial trepanations and healing fractures in the Triassic reptile Stagonolepis, in the absence of infection. The possible cause may instead have been intraspecific combat.

== Paleoecology ==
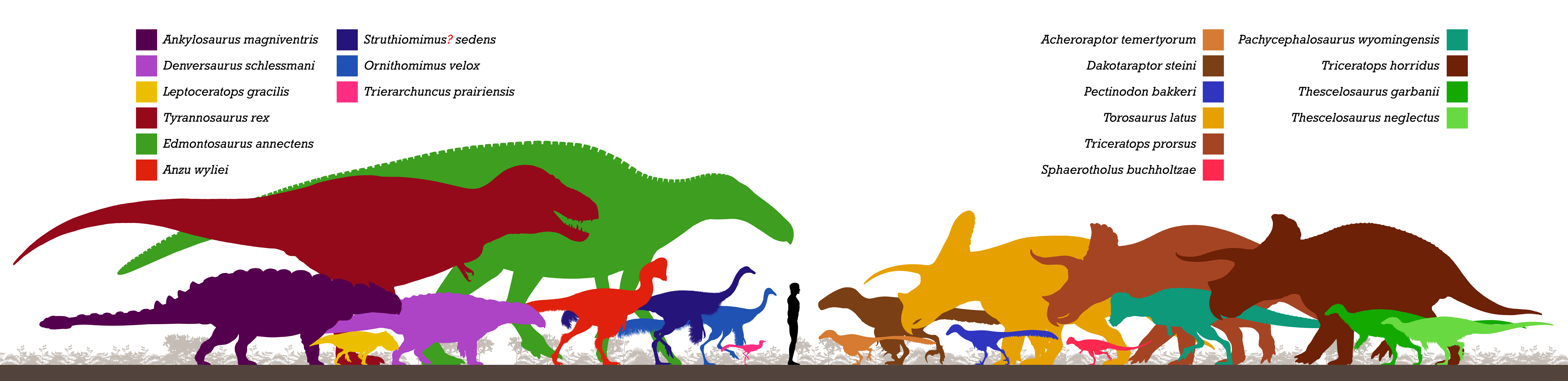
Fauna of Hell Creek (Tyrannosaurus in dark red, left).

Tyrannosaurus lived during what is referred to as the Lancian faunal stage (Maastrichtian age) at the end of the Late Cretaceous. Tyrannosaurus ranged from Canada in the north to at least New Mexico in the south of Laramidia. Several notable Tyrannosaurus remains have been found in the Hell Creek Formation. During the Maastrichtian this area was maritime to subtropical, with a warm and humid climate. The flora consisted mostly of angiosperms, but also included trees like dawn redwood (Metasequoia). Archosaurs discovered from this formation include the ceratopsians Leptoceratops, Torosaurus, and Triceratops, the hadrosaurid Edmontosaurus annectens, the parksosaurid Thescelosaurus, the ankylosaurs Ankylosaurus and Denversaurus, the pachycephalosaurs Pachycephalosaurus, Platytholus and Sphaerotholus, the paravian theropods Acheroraptor and Pectinodon, other maniraptoran theropods Anzu, Eoneophron, Trierarchuncus and indeterminate ornithomimids, the tyrannosauroid Nanotyrannus, and the azhdarchid pterosaur Infernodrakon.

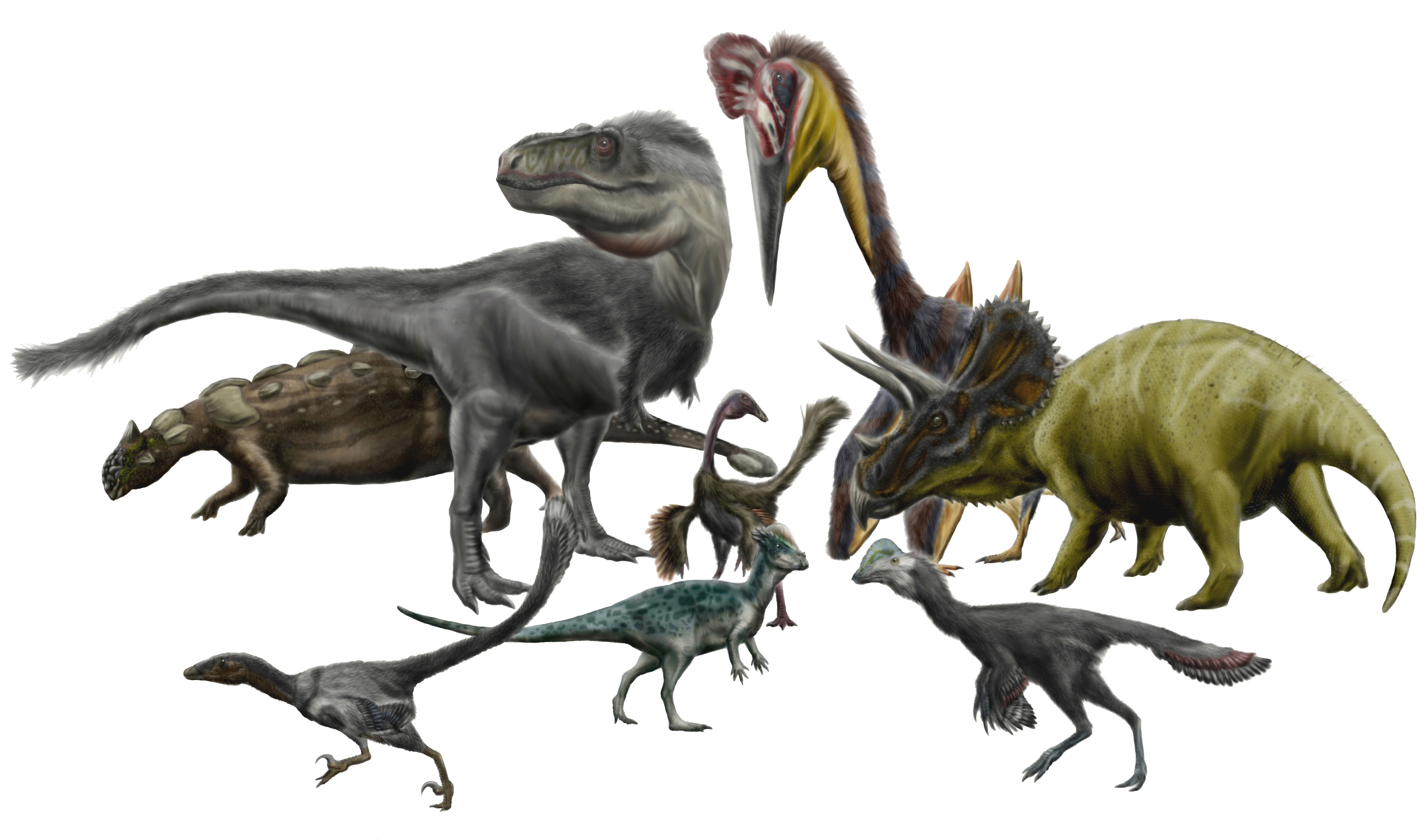
Tyrannosaurus and other animals of the Hell Creek Formation

Another formation with Tyrannosaurus remains is the Lance Formation of Wyoming. This has been interpreted as a bayou environment similar to today's Gulf Coast. The fauna was very similar to Hell Creek, but with Struthiomimus replacing its relative Ornithomimus. The small ceratopsian Leptoceratops also lived in the area.

In its southern range, specifically based on remains discovered from the North Horn Formation of Utah, Tyrannosaurus rex lived alongside the titanosaur Utetitan, the ceratopsid Torosaurus and the indeterminate troodontids and hadrosaurids. Tyrannosaurus mcraeensis from the McRae Group of New Mexico coexisted with the ceratopsid Sierraceratops and possibly the titanosaur Alamosaurus. Potential remains identified as cf. Tyrannosaurus have also been discovered from the Javelina Formation of Texas, where the remains of the titanosaur (either Alamosaurus or Utetitan), the ceratopsid Bravoceratops, the pterosaurs Quetzalcoatlus and Wellnhopterus, and possible species of troodontids and hadrosaurids are found. Its southern range is thought to have been dominated by semi-arid inland plains, following the probable retreat of the Western Interior Seaway as global sea levels fell.

Tyrannosaurus may have also inhabited Mexico's Lomas Coloradas Formation in Sonora. Though skeletal evidence is lacking, six shed and broken teeth from the fossil bed have been thoroughly compared with other theropod genera and appear to be identical to those of Tyrannosaurus. If true, the evidence indicates the range of Tyrannosaurus was possibly more extensive than previously believed. It is possible that tyrannosaurs were originally Asian species, migrating to North America before the end of the Cretaceous period.

=== Population estimates ===
Chart of the time-averaged census for large-bodied dinosaurs from the entire Hell Creek Formation in the study area

According to studies published in 2021 by Charles Marshall et al., the total population of adult Tyrannosaurus at any given time was perhaps 20,000 individuals, with computer estimations also suggesting a total population no lower than 1,300 and no higher than 328,000. The authors themselves suggest that the estimate of 20,000 individuals is probably lower than what should be expected, especially when factoring in that disease pandemics could easily wipe out such a small population. Over the span of the genus' existence, it is estimated that there were about 127,000 generations, totalling roughly 2.5 billion animals.

In the same paper, it is suggested that in a population of Tyrannosaurus adults numbering 20,000, the number of individuals living in an area the size of California could be as high as 3,800 animals, while an area the size of Washington D.C. could support a population of only two adult Tyrannosaurus. The study does not take into account the number of juvenile animals present due to their occupation of a different niche than the adults, and thus it is likely the total population was much higher. Simultaneously, studies of living carnivores suggest that some predator populations are higher in density than others of similar weight (such as jaguars and hyenas, which have vastly differing population densities). Lastly, the study suggests that in most cases, only one in 80 million Tyrannosaurus would become fossilized, while the chances were likely as high as one in every 16,000 of an individual becoming fossilized in areas that had more dense populations.

Meiri (2022) questioned the reliability of the estimates, citing uncertainty in metabolic rate, body size, sex and age-specific survival rates, habitat requirements and range size variability as shortcomings Marshall et al. did not take into account. The authors of the original publication replied that while they agree that their reported uncertainties were probably too small, their framework is flexible enough to accommodate uncerainty in physiology, and that their calculations do not depend on short-term changes but rather on long-term averages. Finally, they remark that they did estimate the range of reasonable survivorship curves and that they did include uncertainty in the time of onset of sexual maturity and in the growth curve by incorporating the uncertainty in the maximum body mass.

== Cultural significance ==
Tyrannosaurus is the most widely known dinosaur in popular culture. Science writer Riley Black states, "In all of prehistory, there is no animal that commands our attention quite like Tyrannosaurus rex... Since the time this dinosaur was officially named in 1905, the enormous carnivore has stood as the ultimate dinosaur." Paleontologist David Hone notes the popularity of Tyrannosaurus models and skeletal displays in museums and writes that films like Jurassic Park and King Kong "would not have been the same without it." T. rex is the only dinosaur that is commonly known to the general public by its full scientific name (binomial name) and the scientific abbreviation T. rex has also come into wide usage.

== See also ==
- History of paleontology
