= List of dinosaur species on display =

This list of dinosaur species on display lists which venue (museum or public or private location) exhibits (or has exhibited) which dinosaur species. Exhibits include skeletons (partial and complete, mounted and unmounted, originals and casts) and reconstructions.

== Asia ==
Type of Exhibit	Taxon	Catalogue number	Nickname	Exhibiting Institution	City	Country	Notes	Image
Skeleton, mounted (copy)	Tyrannosaurus	BHI 3033 (copy)	Stan (copy)	National Museum of Nature and Science (国立科学博物館)	Tokyo	Japan		
Skeleton, mounted	Triceratops	NSM-PV 20379	Raymond	National Museum of Nature and Science (国立科学博物館)	Tokyo	Japan		
Skeleton panel, mounted	Microraptor gui	BMNHC PH 001084		Paleozoological Museum of China (中国古动物馆)	Beijing	China		

== Australia ==
Type of Exhibit	Taxon	Catalogue number	Nickname	Exhibiting Institution	City	Country	Notes	Image
	Deinonychus			Melbourne Museum				
	Gallimimus bullatus	207000		Melbourne Museum	Melbourne	Australia		
	Mamenchisaurus			Melbourne Museum				
	Muttaburrasaurus lagdoni			Melbourne Museum	Melbourne	Australia		
Skeleton, mounted (copy)	Tarbosaurus	206970		Melbourne Museum	Melbourne	Australia		
Mounted skeleton	Tsintaosaurus spinorhinus	206976		Melbourne Museum	Melbourne	Australia		
Mounted skeleton	Triceratops		Horridus	Melbourne Museum	Melbourne	Australia		

== Europe ==
Type of Exhibit	Taxon	Catalogue number	Nickname	Exhibiting Institution	City	Country	Notes	Image
Skeleton, mounted (copy)	Diplodocus carnegiei	CM 84 (copy)	Dippy (Berlin)	Natural History Museum, Berlin	Berlin	Germany		
Skeleton, mounted (copy)	Diplodocus carnegiei	CM 84 (copy)	Dippy (London)	Natural History Museum	London	UK	Since February 2018 not on display in London, but on tour through British museums.	
Statue, life-sized	Diplodocus longus			Naturmuseum Senckenberg	Frankfurt	Germany	Situated outside the museum in public space.	
Statue, life-sized	Frenguellisaurus ischigualastensis			Naturmuseum Senckenberg	Frankfurt	Germany		
Skeleton, mounted	Giraffatitan (formerly Brachiosaurus) brancai	HMN SII	Oskar	Natural History Museum, Berlin	Berlin	Germany		
Statue, life-sized	Sinosauropteryx prima			Naturmuseum Senckenberg	Frankfurt	Germany		
Skeleton, mounted	Stegosaurus stenops	NHMUK PV R36730	Sophie	Natural History Museum, London	London	United Kingdom		
Statue, life-sized	Tyrannosaurus			Naturmuseum Senckenberg	Frankfurt	Germany	Situated outside the museum in public space.	
Skeleton, mounted (copy)	Tyrannosaurus	BHI 3033 (copy)	Stan (copy)	Manchester Museum	Manchester	UK		
Skeleton, mounted (copy)	Tyrannosaurus	BHI 3033 (copy)	Stan (copy)	Natural History Museum at the University of Oslo	Oslo	Norway		
Skeleton, mounted	Tyrannosaurus	MB.R.91216	Tristan-Otto	Natural History Museum of Denmark	Copenhagen	Denmark	2015–January 2020 on display at the Berlin National History Museum.	
Skeleton, mounted	Tyrannosaurus	RGM 792.000	Trix	Naturalis Biodiversity Center	Leiden	Netherlands		
Skeleton, mounted (copy)	Tyrannosaurus	RTMP 81.6.1 (copy)	Black Beauty (copy)	Swedish Museum of Natural History	Stockholm	Sweden		
Statue, life-sized	Unenlagia comahuensis			Naturmuseum Senckenberg	Frankfurt	Germany		

== North America ==
Type of Exhibit	Taxon	Catalogue number	Nickname	Exhibiting Institution	City	State	Country	Notes	Image
Skeleton, mounted	Acrocanthosaurus atokensis	NCSM 14345	Fran	North Carolina Museum of Natural Sciences	Raleigh	North Carolina	USA		
Skeleton, mounted (copy)	Acrocanthosaurus atokensis	NCSM 14345 (copy)		Houston Museum of Natural Science	Houston	Texas	USA		
Skull	Albertosaurus sarcophagus	TMP 1985 098 0001		Royal Tyrrell Museum	Drumheller	Alberta	Canada		
Skeleton, mounted	Allosaurus fragilis	AMNH 5753		American Museum of Natural History	New York	New York	USA		
Skeleton, mounted	Allosaurus fragilis	CM 11844		Carnegie Museum of Natural History	Pittsburgh	Pennsylvania	USA		
Skeleton, mounted	Allosaurus fragilis	DMNS 2249		Denver Museum of Nature and Science	Denver	Colorado	USA		
Skeleton, mounted	Allosaurus fragilis	LACM 46030		Natural History Museum of Los Angeles County	Los Angeles	California	USA		
Skeleton, mounted (copy)	Allosaurus jimmadseni	MOR 693 (copy)	Big Al (copy)	Museum of the Rockies	Bozeman	Montana	USA		
Skeleton, mounted (copy)	Allosaurus jimmadseni	SMA 0005 (copy)	Big Al 2 (copy)	Houston Museum of Natural Science	Houston	Texas	USA		
Skeleton, mounted	Anchiceratops	NMC 8547 (body), NMC 8535 (copy of skull)		Canadian Museum of Nature	Ottawa	Ontario		Might represent a separate taxon	
Partial skull	Anchiceratops ornatus	FMNH P15003		Field Museum of Natural History	Chicago	Illinois	USA		
Partial skull	Anchiceratops ornatus	ROM 802		Royal Ontario Museum	Toronto	Ontario	Canada		
Skull	Anchiceratops ornatus	TMP 1983.001.0001		Royal Tyrrell Museum	Drumheller	Alberta	Canada		
Skeleton, mounted	Apatosaurus	AMNH 460		American Museum of Natural History	New York	New York	USA		
Skeleton, mounted	Apatosaurus louisae	CM 3018		Carnegie Museum of Natural History	Pittsburgh	Pennsylvania	USA		
Skeleton, mounted	Apatosaurus	FMNH P25112/FMNH P27021		Field Museum of Natural History	Chicago	Illinois	USA	May represent a novel species within Apatosaurus	
Skeleton, mounted (copy)	Barosaurus lentus	AMNH 6341 (copy)		American Museum of Natural History	New York	New York	USA		
Skeletal elements, unmounted	Brachiosaurus altithorax	FMNH P 25107		Field Museum of Natural History	Chicago	Illinois	USA	Holotype specimen	
Skeleton, mounted (copy)	Brachiosaurus altithorax	FMNH P 25107 (copy)		Field Museum of Natural History	Chicago	Illinois	USA	Cast of the holotype specimen	
Skeleton, mounted (copy)	Brachiosaurus altithorax	FMNH P 25107 (copy)		O'Hare International Airport	Chicago	Illinois	USA	Cast of the holotype specimen	
Skeleton, mounted	Brontosaurus excelsus	YPM 1980		Peabody Museum of Natural History	New Haven	Connecticut	USA	Holotype specimen	
Skeleton, panel mounted	Camarasaurus lentus	CM 11338		Carnegie Museum of Natural History	Pittsburgh	Pennsylvania	USA		
Skeleton, mounted	Camptosaurus aphanoecetes	CM 11337		Carnegie Museum of Natural History	Pittsburgh	Pennsylvania	USA		
Skull	Centrosaurus apertus	AMNH 5427		American Museum of Natural History	New York	New York	USA		
Skull	Centrosaurus apertus	ROM 767		Royal Ontario Museum	Toronto	Ontario	Canada		
Skeleton, mounted	Chasmosaurus belli	ROM 843		Royal Ontario Museum	Toronto	Ontario	Canada		
Skeleton, mounted	Corythosaurus casuarius	CM 5856		Carnegie Museum of Natural History	Pittsburgh	Pennsylvania	USA		
Skull	Cryolophosaurus ellioti	FMNH PR1821 (copy)		Field Museum of Natural History	Chicago	Illinois	USA	Real skull in collections	
Skeleton, mounted (copy)	Cryolophosaurus ellioti	FMNH PR1821 (copy)		Fryxell Geology Museum	Rock Island	Illinois	USA		
Skeleton, mounted (copy)	Cryolophosaurus ellioti	FMNH PR1821 (copy)		Orton Geological Museum	Columbus	Ohio	USA		
Skull	Daspletosaurus horneri	MOR 590		Museum of the Rockies	Bozeman	Montana	USA	Holotype specimen	
Skeleton, mounted	Daspletosaurus torosus	CMN 8506		Canadian Museum of Nature	Ottawa	Ontario	Canada	Holotype specimen	
Skeleton, mounted	Daspletosaurus	FMNH PR308	Gorgeous George	Field Museum of Natural History	Chicago	Illinois	USA	Originally assigned to Gorgosaurus	
Skeleton, mounted	Diplodocus carnegiei	CM 84	Dippy	Carnegie Museum of Natural History	Pittsburgh	Pennsylvania	USA	Holotype specimen	
Skeleton, mounted	Diplodocus longus	DMNH 1494		Denver Museum of Nature and Science	Denver	Colorado	USA		
Skeleton, mounted	Dracorex hogwartsia	TCMI 2004.17.1		The Children's Museum of Indianapolis	Indianapolis	Indiana	USA		
Skeleton, mounted	Dryosaurus elderae	CM 3392		Carnegie Museum of Natural History	Pittsburgh	Pennsylvania	USA		
Model	Dryptosaurus aquilunguis			Bess Bower Dunn Museum	Libertyville,	Illinois	USA		
Skeleton, mounted	Edmontonia rugosidens	AMNH 5665		American Museum of Natural History	New York	New York	USA		
Skeleton, mounted	Edmontosaurus annectens	AMNH 5730 and AMNH 5886		American Museum of Natural History	New York	New York	USA		
Fossil mummy	Edmontosaurus annectens	AMNH 5060	Trachodon mummy	American Museum of Natural History	New York	New York	USA		
Skull	Edmontosaurus annectens	LACM 23502		Natural History Museum of Los Angeles County	Los Angeles	California	USA		
Skeleton	Edmontosaurus annectens	YPM 2182		Peabody Museum of Natural History	New Haven	Connecticut	USA		
Skeleton	Gorgosaurus libratus	AMNH 5458		American Museum of Natural History	New York	New York	USA		
Skeleton	Gorgosaurus libratus	USNM 12814		National Museum of Natural History	Washington	D.C.	USA	formerly AMNH 5428	
Skeleton	Gorgosaurus libratus	TMP 91.36.500		Royal Tyrrell Museum of Palaeontology	Drumheller	Alberta	Canada	Sub-adult specimen	
Skeleton	Gorgosaurus sternbergi	AMNH 5664		American Museum of Natural History	New York	New York	USA	now recognized as a juvenile Gorgosaurus libratus	
Skull	Lambeosaurus lambei	AMNH 5353		American Museum of Natural History	New York	New York	USA		
Skeleton	Lambeosaurus lambei	FMNH PR 380 (body) UC 1479 (head)		Field Museum of Natural History	Chicago	Illinois	USA		
Skeleton	Lambeosaurus	AMNH 5340		American Museum of Natural History	New York	New York	USA	Juvenile lambeosaurine hadrosaur originally referred to Procheneosaurus praeceps	
Skull (copy)	Majungasaurus crenatissimus	FMNH PR2100		Field Museum of Natural History	Chicago	Illinois	USA		
Skeleton, mounted	Maiasaura peeblesorum	FMNH PR2538		Field Museum of Natural History	Chicago	Illinois	USA		
Skull	Mojoceratops	AMNH 5401		American Museum of Natural History	New York	New York	USA	previously referred to Chasmosaurus kaiseni	
Skull	Pachycephalosaurus wyomingensis	AMNH 1696		American Museum of Natural History	New York	New York	USA		
Skeleton, mounted	Pachyrhinosaurus	TMP 2002.76.1		Royal Tyrell Museum	Drumheller	Alberta	Canada		
Skeleton, mounted	Parasaurolophus cyrtocristatus	FMNH P27393		Field Museum of Natural History	Chicago	Illinois	USA	Holotype specimen	
Skeleton, mounted (copy)	Patagotitan mayorum	MPEF-PV 3400 (copy)		American Museum of Natural History	New York	New York	USA	Composite of six specimens	
Skeleton, mounted (copy)	Patagotitan mayorum	MPEF-PV 3400 (copy)	Maximo	Field Museum of Natural History	Chicago	Illinois	USA	Composite of six specimens	
Skeleton, mounted	Protoceratops andrewsi	CM 9185		Carnegie Museum of Natural History	Pittsburgh	Pennsylvania	USA		
Skeleton, mounted	Protoceratops andrewsi	FMNH PR 14064		Field Museum of Natural History	Chicago	Illinois	USA		
Skull	Regaliceratops	TMP 2005.055.0002		Royal Tyrrell Museum	Drumheller	Alberta	Canada		
Skeleton, mounted	Rapetosaurus krausei	FMNH PR 2209		Field Museum of Natural History	Chicago	Illinois	USA	Juvenile specimen	
Skeleton, panel mounted	Saurolophus osborni	AMNH 5220		American Museum of Natural History	New York	New York	USA		
Skeleton, mounted	Stegosaurus armatus	CM 11341		Carnegie Museum of Natural History	Pittsburgh	Pennsylvania	USA		
Skeleton, mounted	Stegosaurus stenops	AMNH 650		American Museum of Natural History	New York	New York	USA		
Skeleton, mounted (copy)	Stegosaurus stenops	AMNH 650 (copy)		Field Museum of Natural History	Chicago	Illinois	USA		
Skeleton, mounted	Stegosaurus stenops	DMNS 1483		Denver Museum of Nature and Science	Denver	Colorado	USA		
Skeleton, mounted	Stegosaurus stenops	LACM 16440		Natural History Museum of Los Angeles County	Los Angeles	California	USA		
Skeleton, mounted (copy)	Stegosaurus stenops	NHMUK PV R36730 (copy)		Houston Museum of Natural Science	Houston	Texas	USA		
Skeleton, mounted	Styracosaurus	AMNH 5372		American Museum of Natural History	New York	New York	USA		
Skeleton, mounted	Triceratops	HMNS 2006.1743.00	Lane	Houston Museum of Natural Science	Houston	Texas	USA		
Skeleton, mounted	Triceratops	MOR 3027	Yoshi's Trike	Museum of the Rockies	Bozeman	Montana	USA		
Skeleton, mounted	Triceratops horridus	AMNH 5116		American Museum of Natural History	New York	New York	USA		
Skeleton, mounted (copy)	Triceratops horridus	AMNH 5116 (copy)		Cleveland Museum of Natural History	Cleveland	Ohio	USA		
Skeleton, mounted (copy)	Triceratops horridus	AMNH 5116 (copy)		Field Museum of Natural History	Chicago	Illinois	USA		
Skeleton, mounted	Triceratops horridus	BMRP 2006.4.1	Homer	Burpee Museum of Natural History	Rockford	Illinois	USA	Sub-adult specimen	
Skull	Triceratops horridus	FMNH P12003		Field Museum of Natural History	Chicago	Illinois	USA		
Skeleton, mounted	Triceratops prorsus	CM 1219		Carnegie Museum of Natural History	Pittsburgh	Pennsylvania	USA		
Skeleton, mounted	Triceratops prorsus	LACM 151459		Natural History Museum of Los Angeles County	Los Angeles	California	USA		
Skeleton, mounted	Tyrannosaurus	AMNH 5027		American Museum of Natural History	New York	New York	USA		
Skeleton, mounted (copy)	Tyrannosaurus	AMNH 5027 (copy)		Denver Museum of Nature and Science	Denver	Colorado	USA		
Skeleton, mounted (copy)	Tyrannosaurus	AMNH 5027 (copy)		Academy of Natural Sciences of Drexel University	Philadelphia	Pennsylvania	USA		
Skeleton, mounted	Tyrannosaurus	BHI 3033	Stan	Black Hills Museum of Natural History	Hill City	South Dakota	USA	Found in 1987.	
Skeleton, mounted (copy)	Tyrannosaurus	BHI 3033 (copy)	Stan (copy)	Dinosaur Discovery Museum	Kenosha	Wisconsin	USA		
Skeleton, mounted (copy)	Tyrannosaurus	BHI 3033 (copy)	Stan (copy)	Houston Museum of Natural Science	Houston	Texas	USA		
Skull (copy)	Tyrannosaurus	BHI 3033 (copy)	Stan (copy)	Jurica-Suchy Nature Museum	Lisle	Illinois	USA		
Skeleton, mounted (copy)	Tyrannosaurus	BHI 3033 (copy)	Stan (copy)	National Museum of Natural History	Washington, D.C.	District of Columbia	USA		
Skeleton, mounted (copy)	Tyrannosaurus	BHI 3033 (copy)	Stan (copy)	New Mexico Museum of Natural History and Science	Albuquerque	New Mexico	USA		
Skeleton, mounted (copy)	Tyrannosaurus	BHI 3033 (copy)	Stan (copy)	Sternberg Museum of Natural History	Fort Hays	Kansas	USA		
Skeleton, mounted (copy)	Tyrannosaurus	BHI 3033 (copy)	Stan (copy)	The Children's Museum of Indianapolis	Indianapolis	Indiana	USA		
Skeleton, mounted (copy)	Tyrannosaurus	BHI 3033 (copy)	Stan (copy)	Weis Earth Science Museum	Menasha	Wisconsin	USA		
Skeleton, mounted (copy)	Tyrannosaurus	BHI 3033 (copy)	Stan (copy)	Wyoming Dinosaur Center	Thermopolis	Wyoming	USA		
Skeleton, mounted	Nanotyrannus	BMR P2002.4.1	Jane	Burpee Museum of Natural History	Rockford	Illinois	USA	Juvenile specimen	
Skeleton, mounted (copy)	Nanotyrannus	BMR P2002.4.1 (copy)	Jane (copy)	Carnegie Museum of Natural History	Pittsburgh	Pennsylvania	USA		
Skeleton, mounted (copy)	Nanotyrannus	BMR P2002.4.1 (copy)	Jane (copy)	Cleveland Museum of Natural History	Cleveland	Ohio	USA		
Skeleton, mounted	Tyrannosaurus rex	CM 9380		Carnegie Museum of Natural History	Pittsburgh	Pennsylvania	USA	Holotype specimen	
Skeleton, mounted	Tyrannosaurus	FMNH PR2081	Sue	Field Museum of Natural History	Chicago	Illinois	USA	Found in 1990. Most complete. Largest T.rex fossil specimen. Approx. 40 feet long, estimated 9.5 tons (live).	
Skeleton, mounted (copy)	Tyrannosaurus	FMNH PR2081 (copy)	Sue (copy)	Disney's Animal Kingdom	Bay Lake	Florida	USA		
Skeleton, mounted	Tyrannosaurus	HMNS 2006.1743.01	Wyrex	Houston Museum of Natural Science	Houston	Texas	USA		
Skeleton, mounted	Tyrannosaurus	LACM 150167	Thomas	Natural History Museum of Los Angeles County	Los Angeles	California	USA		
Skeleton, mounted	Tyrannosaurus	LACM 23844		Natural History Museum of Los Angeles County	Los Angeles	California	USA		
Skeleton, mounted	Tyrannosaurus	LACM 23845		Natural History Museum of Los Angeles County	Los Angeles	California	USA		
Skeleton, mounted	Tyrannosaurus	LACM 28471		Natural History Museum of Los Angeles County	Los Angeles	California	USA	Juvenile specimen	
Skeleton, mounted	Tyrannosaurus	MOR 555	Wankel Rex	National Museum of Natural History	Washington, D.C.	District of Columbia	USA	On lease from U.S. Army Corps of Engineers	
Skeleton, mounted (copy)	Tyrannosaurus	MOR 555 (copy)	Big Mike	Museum of the Rockies	Bozeman	Montana	USA	Big Mike is a bronze cast of MOR 555	
Skeleton, mounted (copy)	Tyrannosaurus	MOR 555 (copy)		University of California Museum of Paleontology	Berkeley	California	USA		
Skeleton, mounted (copy)	Tyrannosaurus	MOR 555 (copy)		Cleveland Museum of Natural History	Cleveland	Ohio	USA		
Skeleton, mounted (copy)	Tyrannosaurus	MOR 555 (copy)		Googleplex	Mountain View	California	USA		
Skeleton, mounted (copy)	Tyrannosaurus	MOR 555 (copy)		Perot Museum of Nature and Science	Dallas	Texas	USA		
Skeleton, mounted	Tyrannosaurus	MOR 980	Peck's Rex	Museum of the Rockies	Bozeman	Montana	USA		
Skeleton, mounted (copy)	Tyrannosaurus	MOR 980 (copy)	Peck's Rex (copy)	Carnegie Museum of Natural History	Pittsburgh	Pennsylvania	USA		
Skeleton, mounted (copy)	Tyrannosaurus	MOR 980 (copy)	Peck's Rex (copy)	Maryland Science Center	Baltimore	Maryland	USA		
Skeleton, mounted	Tyrannosaurus	RTMP 81.6.1	Black Beauty	Royal Tyrrell Museum	Drumheller	Alberta	Canada		
Skeleton, mounted	Tyrannosaurus	RTMP 81.12.1	Huxley T.rex	Royal Tyrrell Museum	Drumheller	Alberta	Canada		
Skeleton, mounted	Tyrannosaurus	TCM 2001.90.1	Bucky	The Children's Museum of Indianapolis	Indianapolis	Indiana	USA		
Skeleton, mounted (copy)	Tyrannosaurus	TCM 2001.90.1 (copy)	Bucky (copy)	Houston Museum of Natural Science	Houston	Texas	USA		
Skeleton, mounted (copy)	Zuniceratops christopheri	MSM P 4185 (copy)		Arizona Museum of Natural History	Mesa	Arizona	USA		
Skull (copy)	Zuniceratops christopheri	MSM P 4185 (copy)		Natural History Museum of Utah	Salt Lake City	Utah	USA		

== See also ==
- List of museums and colleges with mastodon fossils on display
- List of natural history museums
- List of fossil sites
- List of dinosaur genera
