= Sue Hendrickson =

American explorer and fossil collector

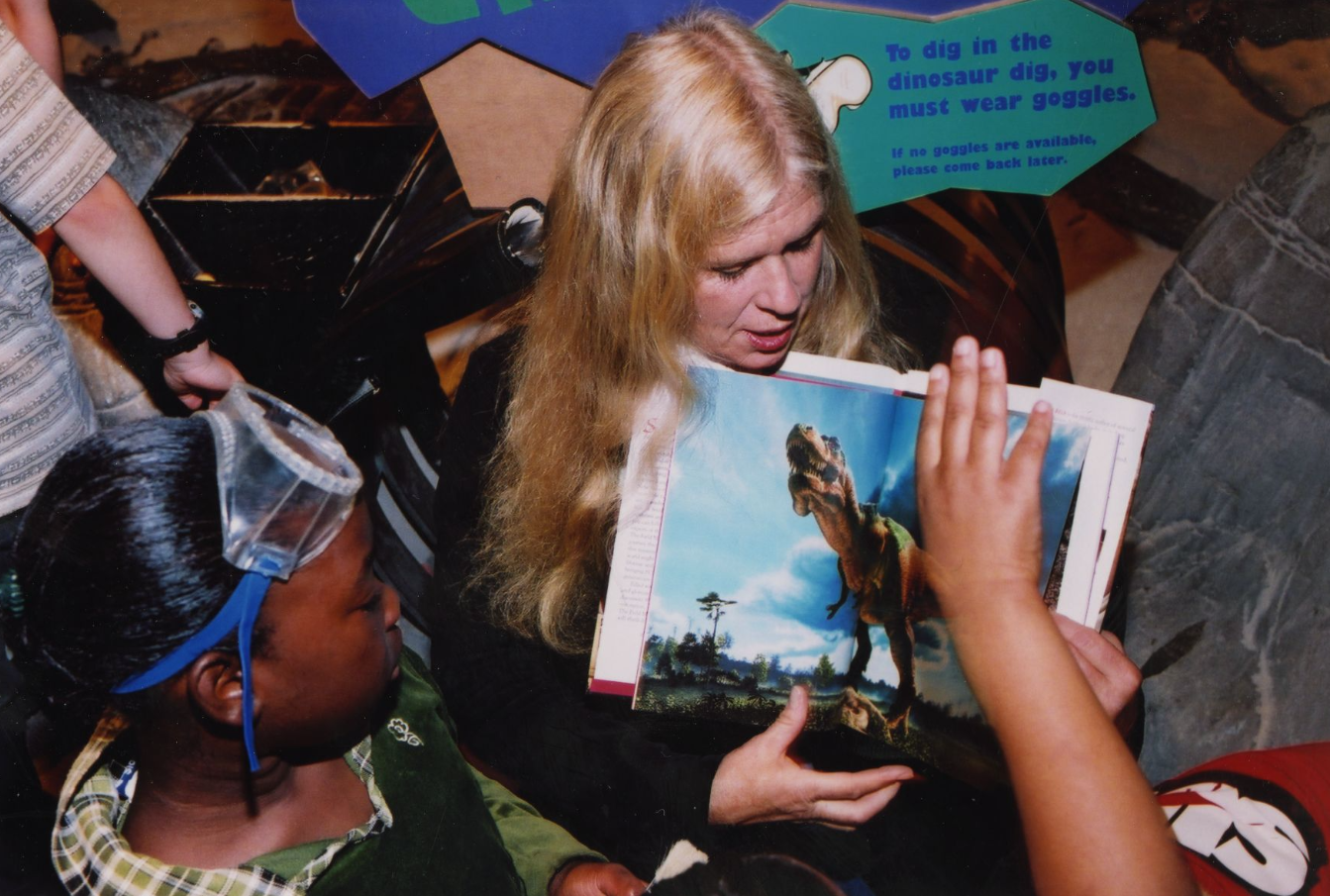
- Sue Hendrickson reading to children about dinosaurs in 2001
- Born: Susan Hendrickson; December 2, 1949 (age 76); Chicago, Illinois, U.S.
- Known for: Discovering the T. rex Sue
- Scientific career
- Fields: Vertebrate paleontology; paleoentomology; marine archaeology

Susan Hendrickson (born December 2, 1949) is an American explorer and fossil collector. Hendrickson is best known for her discovery of the remains of a Tyrannosaurus rex in South Dakota on August 12, 1990, in the Cheyenne River Reservation. Her discovery is the most complete skeleton of Tyrannosaurus known to science. This skeleton is now known as "Sue" in honor of her. It is on display at the Field Museum in Chicago, Illinois. She has also found other important fossils and artifacts around the world.

== Early life ==
Hendrickson was born in Chicago, Illinois, to Lee and Mary Hendrickson; her family soon moved to nearby Munster, Indiana, where she grew up. She has two siblings: an older brother, John, and her younger sister, Karen. Her father was a successful railroad purchasing agent, while her mother worked at American Airlines.

In 1955, Hendrickson was enrolled at Munster's public elementary school, frequently being praised by her teachers as "a good student and obedient child". However, she eventually found herself bored with school in Munster, and at age 16 was able to convince her parents to let her stay with her aunt in Florida, where she enrolled at a Fort Lauderdale high school. An adventurous and rebellious teenager, Hendrickson never completed high school, dropping out at the age of 17 in favor of moving from state to state with her boyfriend before settling in Florida, where she was hired by two professional divers who ran an aquarium fish business. A strong swimmer who had once been on her high school's swim team, Hendrickson quickly learned to dive and began collecting tropical fish off the Florida Keys to sell to aquarists and pet stores.

Aside from her work as a diver, Hendrickson also worked part of the year as a lobster fisherman, and would occasionally take the summer off to volunteer on paleontological digs. She later moved to Seattle, earned her GED, and considered enrolling at the University of Washington in order to pursue a marine biology degree, but decided against it, leaving Seattle after a year and moving back to Florida to pursue her diving career.

== Career ==
In 1970, Hendrickson had a large circle of friends in the diving business, and one day was invited to participate in a salvage diving expedition off the Florida Keys, which she eagerly undertook. Her job was to retrieve valuable building materials that were stored in a cargo freighter which ran aground on a coral reef. While continuing her work in salvage, Hendrickson soon found herself exploring old shipwrecks, later going to the Dominican Republic. She was fascinated by working in the company of archaeologists and fell in love with the country, visiting the island often.

By the mid-1980s, Hendrickson had also attempted mining amber in the Dominican mountains. She had become one of the largest amber providers for scientists. Hendrickson also found three perfect 23-million-year-old butterflies, which make up a half of the whole world's total collection. Although she found the work too monotonous to pursue full-time, writing that "You could dig for months and find nothing in the Dominican caves," she continued studying paleo entomology, becoming an expert at identifying fossilized insects.

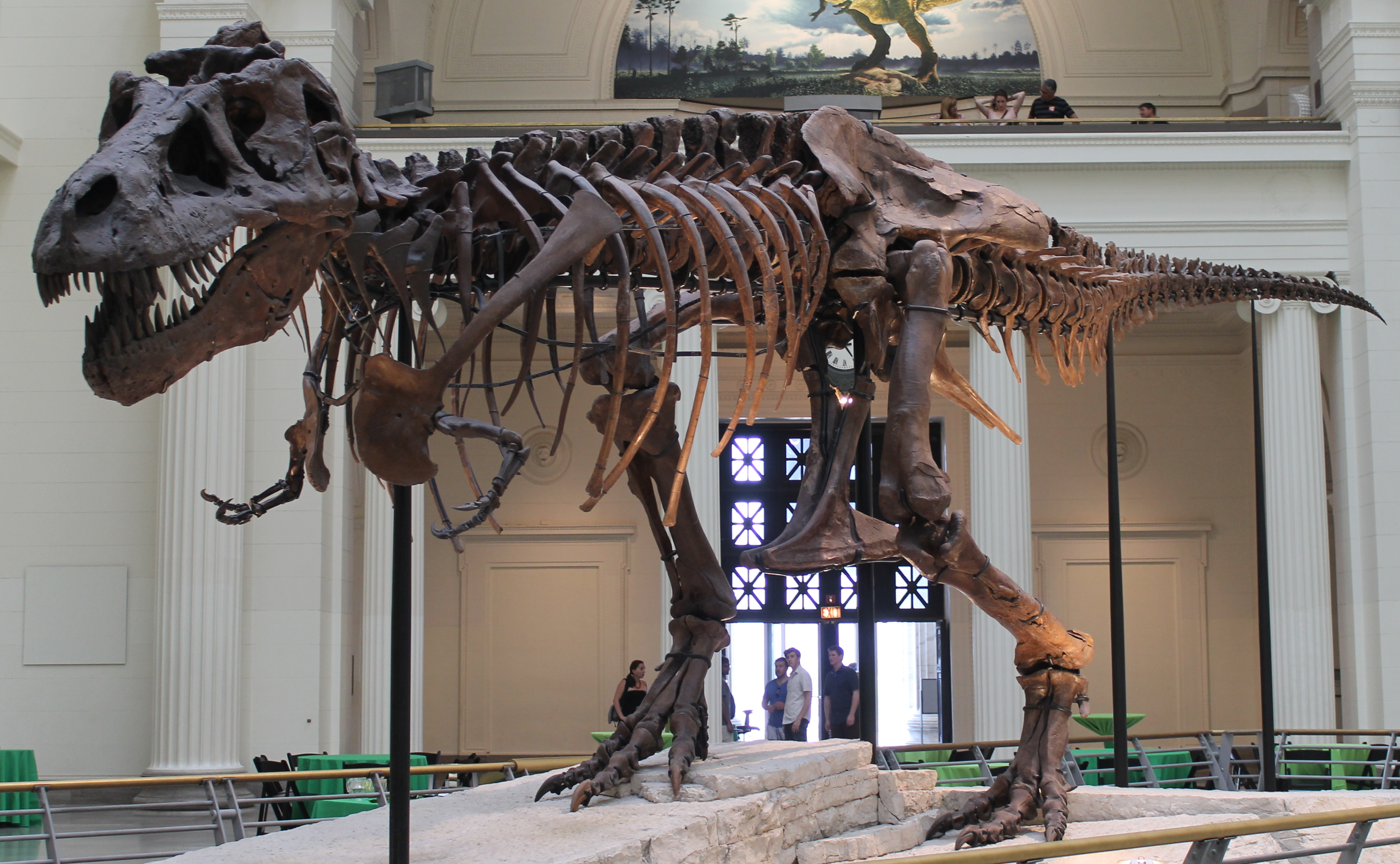
T. rex specimen discovered by Sue Hendrickson

She also met Swiss paleontologist Kirby Siber, who allowed her to join his team consisting of paleontologists Carlos Martin and Peter Larson. The group began excavating Miocene baleen whale fossils at an ancient seabed in Peru, and Hendrickson joined the team for several summers, discovering fossilized dolphins, whales, and sharks. She later accompanied Larson to the Black Hills Institute in South Dakota. By this time, paleontology had become her main passion. On August 12, 1990, while examining a cliff-side in South Dakota with a team from the Black Hills Institute, she discovered a Tyrannosaurus rex specimen – the largest, most complete, and best preserved T. rex ever found. The specimen was later named "Sue" in her honor.

In 1992, Hendrickson joined a team of marine archaeologists headed by Franck Goddio. With them, she took part in many diving expeditions, the most notable of which were the Royal Quarters of Cleopatra, and Napoleon Bonaparte's lost fleet from the Battle of the Nile.

In 2005, Glamour magazine honored her in their "Glamour Woman of the Year Awards". In 2001, she published an autobiography entitled Hunt for the Past: My Life as an Explorer (New York, NY: Scholastic, Inc). In 2008, she was featured on the "Dare to Explore" chapter of National Geographic Kids.

Hendrickson now lives on the island of Guanaja, off the coast of Honduras. She is a member of the Paleontological Society, Explorers Club, Society for Historical Archaeology, and was awarded an honorary Ph.D. from the University of Illinois at Chicago in 2000.
