= Scotty (dinosaur) =

Dinosaur specimen

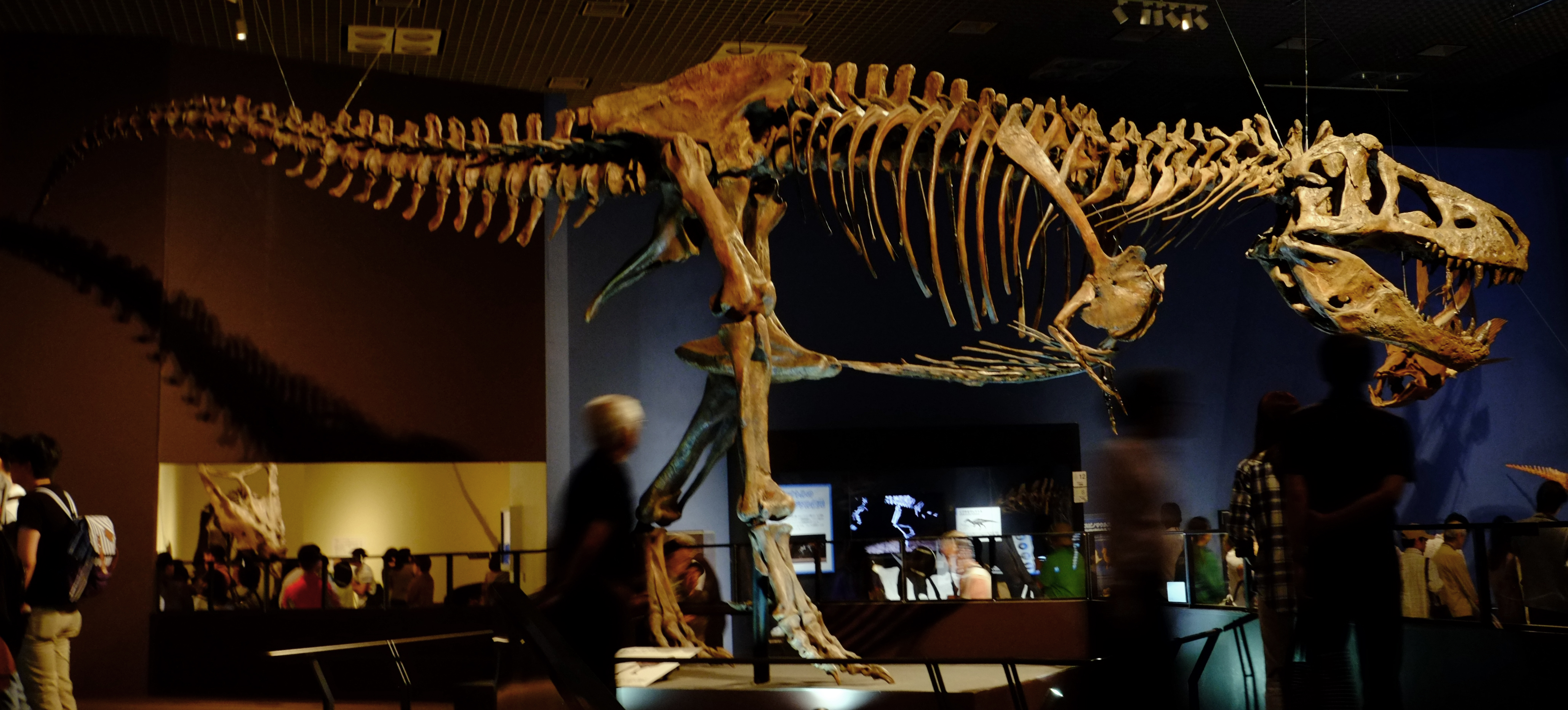
- A replica of Scotty on display at the National Museum of Nature and Science, Tokyo
- Catalog no.: RSM P2523.8
- Common name: Scotty
- Species: Tyrannosaurus rex
- Age: c. 66.043 million years (aged c. 25)
- Place discovered: Saskatchewan, Canada
- Date discovered: 16 August 1991
- Discovered by: Robert Gebhardt

Scotty is the nickname for the Tyrannosaurus rex fossil, catalogued as RSM P2523.8, that was discovered in Saskatchewan, Canada in 1991. The fossilised remains were painstakingly removed, almost completely by hand, over two decades from the rock in which they were embedded. When the preparation was complete in 2011, an around 65% complete T. rex skeleton was revealed.

Since its discovery and extensive subsequent study, Scotty has been referred to as the largest T. rex ever discovered in the world, the largest of any dinosaur discovered in Canada, and as one of the oldest and most complete fossils of its kind at more than 70% bulk.

Scotty resides at the Royal Saskatchewan Museum's T. rex Discovery Centre in Eastend, Saskatchewan, Canada. In May 2019, a second mount was erected at the Royal Saskatchewan Museum in Regina, where the exhibit reflects the recent discoveries about the fossil.

== Discovery ==
Scotty was discovered by Robert Gebhardt, a high school principal from Eastend, Saskatchewan, who accompanied a team of palaeontologists from the Royal Saskatchewan Museum (RSM) on a prospective expedition into the Frenchman Formation alongside the Frenchman River Valley in southwestern Saskatchewan on 16 August 1991. Although he was only there to learn how to find and identify fossils, Gebhardt uncovered a tooth and tail vertebra that the museum was able to verify belonged to a T. rex. Initially, Gebhardt thought that the visible fossil was actually ironstone.

It wasn't until June 1994 that the Royal Saskatchewan Museum was able to begin the excavation, which was led and overseen by the Museum's Ron Borden, as well as resident palaeontologists Tim Tokaryk and John Storer who were with Gebhardt when he uncovered the first fossils. The bones were deeply packed in dense, iron-laden sandstone, which took more than twenty years for the team to fully remove, excavate, and assemble the majority of the skeleton, with additional trips being made to the site to retrieve smaller bones and teeth. The entire process of excavating the skeleton was also slowed down by its considerable size.

The first fossils unearthed were part of the upper body, specifically vertebrae, parts of the jaw, and teeth. At the time of its discovery, the fossil was one of only 12 known T. rex skeletons of significant completion. The name "Scotty" came from the celebratory bottle of scotch shared by the team that had discovered and identified the bones. Alongside the fossil was also found the only known T. rex coprolite in the world.

== Description ==
=== Size ===
In 2010, the University of Alberta Department of Biological Sciences' Scott Pearson began work on a research project that sought to compare the sizes of known T. rex fossils. His findings, published in 2019, yielded that Scotty is the largest (in weight and length), having out-measured the previous largest known Tyrannosaurus rex: Sue of the Chicago Field Museum (FMNH 2081). After prolonged study of the growth patterns in the bones, "Scotty" was also declared as one of the oldest known T. rex fossils at 30 years old. The specimen known as Trix is also estimated to have been 30 years old upon its death. However, Scotty's age was later revised to ~23–27 years old. Scotty has even been recognised as one of the youngest and least mature adults while being the largest specimen for the species.

Scotty is reported to be 12–13 metres (39–43 feet) long and stands 4 meters (13 ft) tall at the hips and weighed an estimated 6–8.87 tonnes (6,000–8,870 kg). Despite it not being a complete fossil, palaeontologists were able to create the estimation for the weight and length through measurements of important weight bearing bones such as the femur, hip, and shoulder bones that have all been measured to be larger and thicker with Scotty than the corresponding bones with Sue. Going from the latest study, Scotty exceeds Sue in 84.6% of the published measurements. Scotty has a larger hip girdle than Sue; its femur is also longer and wider than Sue's at 133 cm and has a circumference of 590 mm while Sue has a femur length of 132 cm and a circumference of 580 mm. The projected weight was calculated by analysing how much weight the leg bones would have been able to support. The fossil is dated at around 68 to 66 million years ago. Scientists are unsure if Scotty was male or female, which is not unusual for a T. rex specimen.

Both specimens Sue and Scotty had their weights estimated in the latest study. The method used to calculate the mass in the latest study was the same for both of the specimens and the data shows that Scotty is heavier than Sue is. The latest study put Scotty's weight at an estimated 8,870 kg (9.7 tons) while Sue is estimated at 8,462 kg (9.3 tons) Sue has had similar results made on its weight in the past such as Scott Hartman's result of 8,400 kg (9.2 tons) obtained through GDI analysis. This is also not the first time that Scotty has been estimated to out mass the specimen Sue. A study conducted back in 2014 that estimated the weight for some of the large theropod dinosaurs and both Sue and Scotty were included. This older study concluded that Sue was around 7,377 kg (8.1 tons) with a weight range of 5,531 kg (6 tons) to 9,224 kg (10 tons) while Scotty was heavier at 8,004 kg (8.8 tons) with a weight range of 6,000 kg (6.6 tons) to 10,007 kg (11 tons).

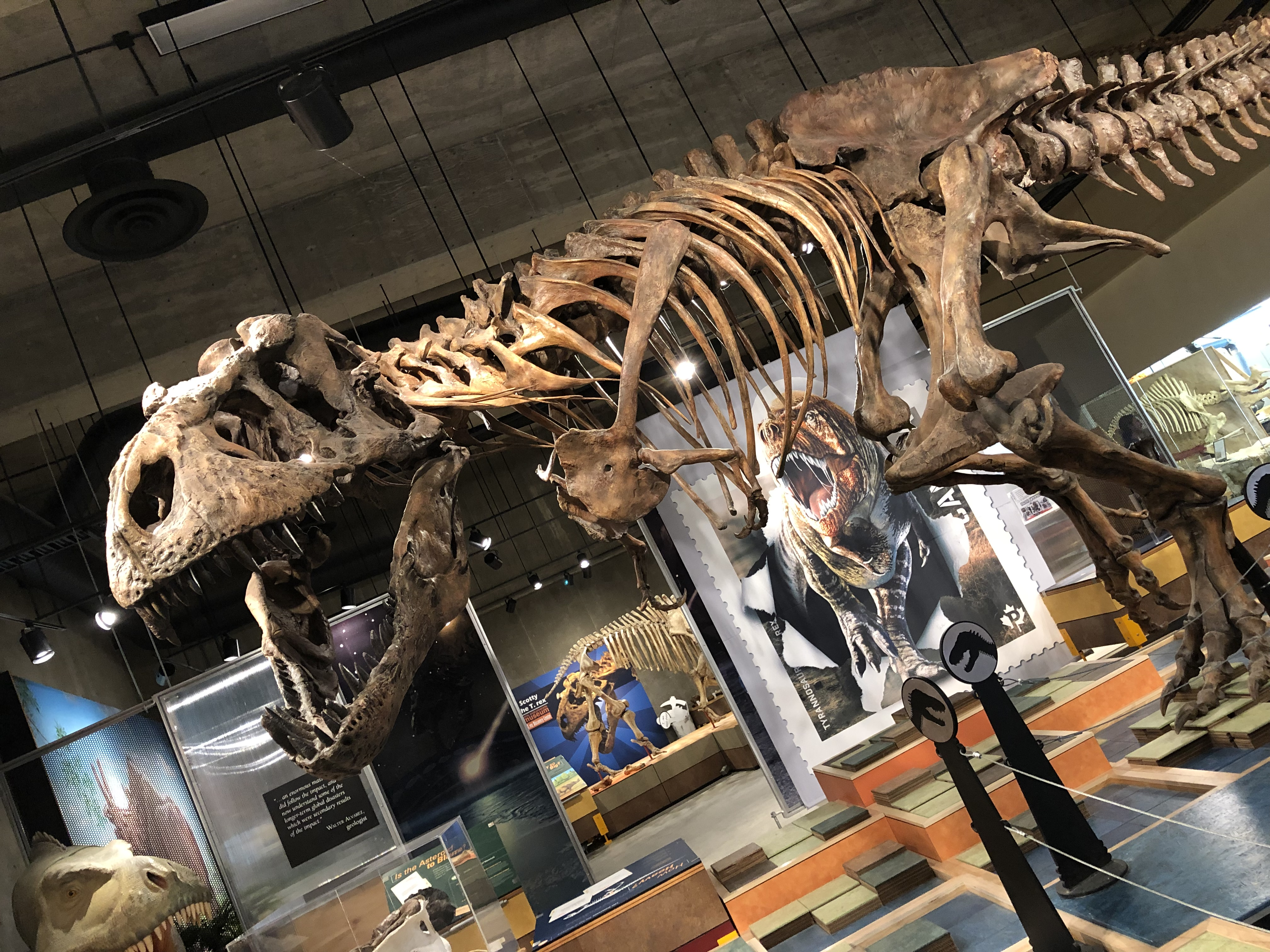
Life-size cast of Scotty on display at the T. rex Discovery Centre in Eastend, Saskatchewan

While the reported measurements and weight for Scotty are larger than those of Sue, some scientists posit that the two fossils are too close in size to officially declare Scotty the largest. Evolutionary expert John Hutchinson of the University of London's Royal Veterinary College has stated that the 5% margin separating Sue and Scotty is too close to rule out any error and that the difference most likely came down to inches and ounces, rather than the reported feet. The method that was used to calculate its size is not exact and remains another point of contention for the fossil's titles. This could have resulted in Pearson and his team overestimating Scotty's size. The Chicago Field Museum's resident palaeontologist and curator of dinosaurs, Pete Macovicky, has stated that he believes Scotty and Sue are "statistically indistinguishable". Nonetheless, Scotty has presented scientists with new possibilities for the size and age that T. rex could have grown to.

=== Pathology ===
Like other T. rex fossils, Scotty shows signs of trichomonas, a parasitic infection in the jaw that left visible holes in the bone and was unique to this specific species of dinosaur. Additionally, a broken and healed rib on its right side, broken tail vertebra, as well as a hole near the eye socket are possibly the result of another T. rex attack. Other abnormalities, such as impacted teeth, suggest that Scotty was not only bitten, but also bit other animals. Vessel-like structures found in a rib that show partial Fe-mineralisation indicate that Scotty died within months of suffering the bone fracture.

== See also ==
- Specimens of Tyrannosaurus
- Sue (dinosaur)
- Stan (dinosaur)
- Timeline of tyrannosaur research
- Trix (dinosaur)
