= List of museums and colleges with mastodon fossils on display =

This list of museums and colleges includes locations exhibiting mastodon fossils.

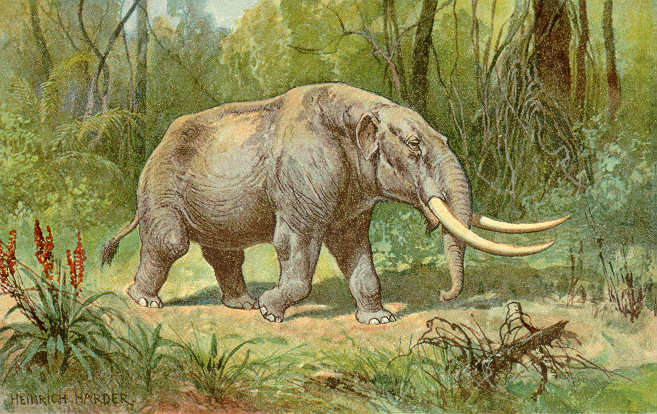
Mastodon by Heinrich Harder.

== Austria ==
Location	City	Notes	Reference
Universalmuseum Joanneum	Graz		

== Canada ==
Location	City	Notes	Reference
Joseph Brant Museum	Burlington, Ontario		
Royal Ontario Museum	Toronto, Ontario		
New Brunswick Museum	Saint John, New Brunswick	The Hillsborough Mastodon specimen.	
Nova Scotia Museum of Natural History	Halifax		

== Germany ==
Location	City	Notes	Reference
Hessisches Landesmuseum Darmstadt	Darmstadt		

== Italy ==
Location	City	Notes	Reference
Museo di Storia Naturale di Firenze (University of Florence)	Florence		

== Japan ==
Location	City	Notes	Reference
National Museum of Nature and Science	Tokyo		

== United Kingdom ==
Location	City	Notes	Reference
Natural History Museum	London		

== United States ==
=== Alabama ===
Location	City	Notes	Reference
Alabama Museum of Natural History	Tuscaloosa		

=== Alaska ===
Location	City	Notes	Reference
University of Alaska Museum of the North	Fairbanks		

=== Arkansas ===
Location	City	Notes	Reference
Arkansas State University Museum	Jonesboro		
Mid-America Science Museum			

=== California ===
Location	City	Notes	Reference
La Brea Tar Pits	Los Angeles		
Natural History Museum of Los Angeles County	Los Angeles		
Western Science Center	Hemet	Nicknamed "Max"	
San Diego Natural History Museum	San Diego		

=== Connecticut ===
Location	City	Notes	Reference
Peabody Museum of Natural History (Yale University)	New Haven		

=== Florida ===
Location	City	Notes	Reference
Brevard Museum of History and Natural Science	Cocoa		
Florida Museum of Natural History (University of Florida)	Gainesville		
Museum of Florida History	Tallahassee		

=== Idaho ===
Location	City	Notes	Reference
Hagerman Fossil Beds National Monument	Hagerman		

=== Illinois ===
Location	City	Notes	Reference
Fryxell Geology Museum at Augustana College	Rock Island		
Bess Bower Dunn Museum of Lake County	Libertyville		
Field Museum of Natural History	Chicago		
Illinois State Museum	Springfield		
Phillips Park (Visitor Center and Mastodon Gallery)	Aurora		
Wheaton College	Wheaton	Perry Mastodon	

=== Indiana ===
Location	City	Notes	Reference
The Children's Museum of Indianapolis	Indianapolis		
Hanover College Science Center	Hanover		
Joseph Moore Museum	Richmond		
Indiana State Museum	Indianapolis		
Porter County Museum	Valparaiso		

=== Maine ===
Location	City	Notes	Reference
L.C. Bates Museum	Hinckley		

=== Massachusetts ===
Location	City	Notes	Reference
Beneski Museum of Natural History (Amherst College)	Amherst		
Harvard Museum of Natural History	Cambridge	Harvard Mastodon	

=== Maryland ===
Location	City	Notes	Reference
Maryland Center for History and Culture			

=== Michigan ===
Location	City	Notes	Reference
Cranbrook Institute of Science	Bloomfield Hills		
University of Michigan Museum of Natural History	Ann Arbor		

=== Missouri ===
Location	City	Notes	Reference
Mastodon State Historic Site	Imperial		

=== Nebraska ===
Location	City	Notes	Reference
University of Nebraska State Museum	Lincoln		

=== New Jersey ===
Location	City	Notes	Reference
Rutgers University Geology Museum	New Brunswick		
Sussex County Historical Society Museum	Newton		

=== New York ===
Location	City	Notes	Reference
American Museum of Natural History	New York		
Bear Mountain State Park (Geology Museum)			
Buffalo Museum of Science	Buffalo		
Cambridge High School (New York)	Cambridge		
Cornell University	Ithaca	Cornell/Gilbert Mastodon at Snee Hall	
Museum of the Earth	Ithaca		
New York State Museum	Albany		
Orange County Community College	Middletown		
Rochester Museum and Science Center	Rochester		
Museum Village of Old Smith's Clove	Monroe		

=== North Dakota ===
Location	City	Notes	Reference
North Dakota Heritage Center	Bismarck		

=== Ohio ===
Location	City	Noyes	Reference
Cleveland Museum of Natural History	Cleveland		
Ohio History Connection (Ohio History Center)	Columbus		
William McKinley Presidential Library and Museum (Discover World)	Canton		

=== Oregon ===
Location	City	Notes	Reference
Tualatin Public Library	Tualatin		

=== Pennsylvania ===
Location	City	Notes	Reference
Carnegie Museum of Natural History	Pittsburgh		
State Museum of Pennsylvania	Harrisburg		

=== Tennessee ===
Location	City	Notes	Reference
Tennessee State Museum	Nashville		
Tipton County Museum	Covington		

=== Texas ===
Location	City	Notes	Reference
Houston Museum of Natural Science	Houston		

=== Washington ===
Location	City	Notes	Reference
Museum and Arts Center	Sequim		

=== Washington, D.C. ===
Location	Notes	Reference
National Museum of Natural History		

=== Wisconsin ===
Location	City	Notes	Reference
Milwaukee Public Museum	Milwaukee		
UW Madison Geology Museum	Madison		

== See also ==
- List of fossil sites
- List of fossil parks
- List of natural history museums
- List of dinosaur species on display
