= Sue (dinosaur) =

Exceptional Tyrannosaurus rex fossil

Coordinates: 41°51′58″N 87°37′01″W

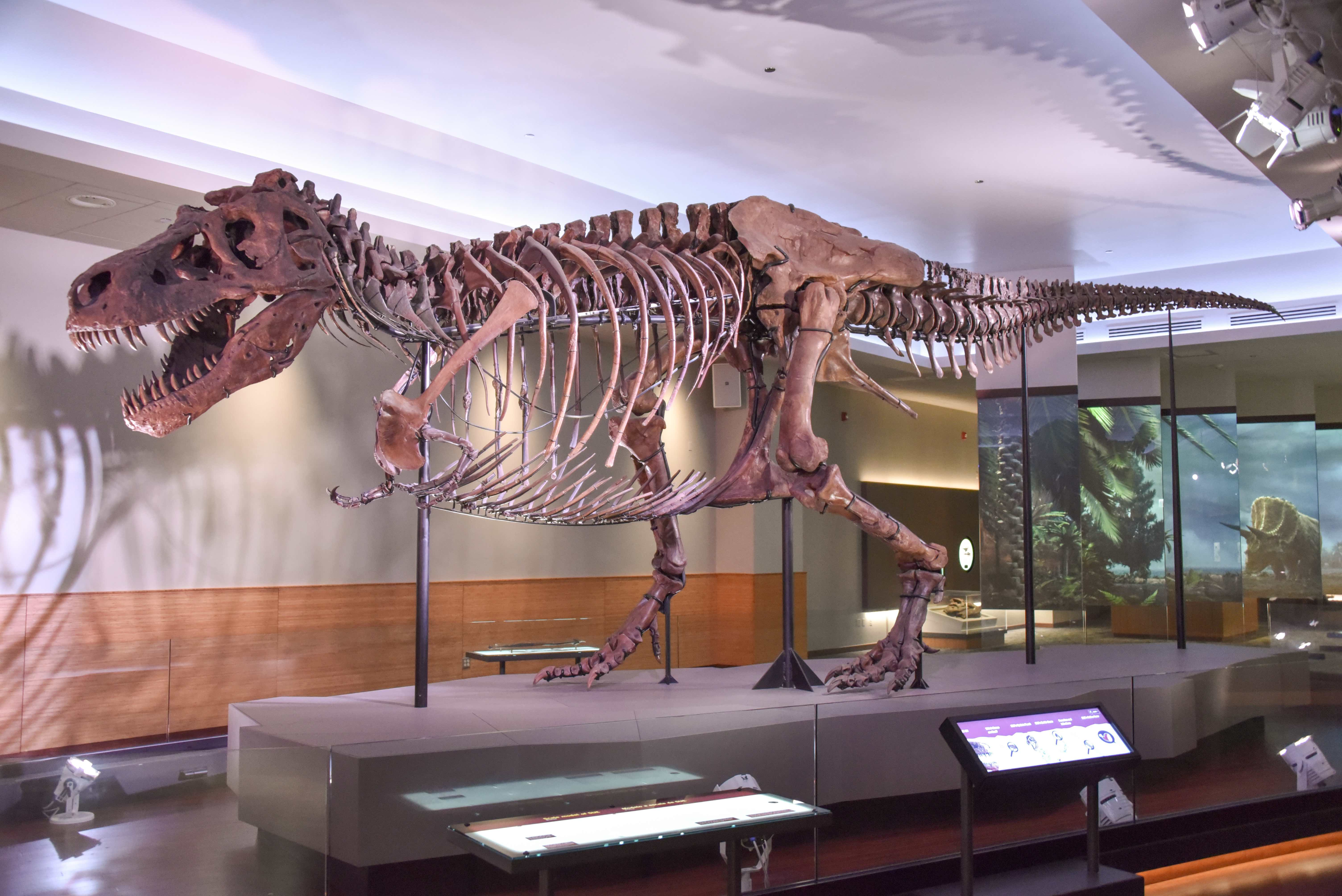
- Sue on display in the Field Museum of Natural History, Chicago (with some bones reconstructed)
- Catalog no.: FMNH PR 2081
- Common name: Sue
- Species: Tyrannosaurus rex
- Age: c. 67 million years (aged c. 33)
- Place discovered: Cheyenne River Indian Reservation, South Dakota, U.S.
- Date discovered: August 12, 1990
- Discovered by: Susan Hendrickson

Sue (Note: The name officially is stylized in all capital letters: SUE. This helps distinguish the specimen from its discoverer, Sue Hendrickson.) (stylized: SUE), officially designated FMNH PR 2081, is one of the largest, (Note: Another specimen called 'Scotty' was reported in 2019 to be the largest.) most extensive, and best preserved Tyrannosaurus rex fossils ever found, at over 90% recovered by bulk.

FMNH PR 2081 was discovered on August 12, 1990, by American explorer and fossil collector Sue Hendrickson, after whom it is named. After ownership disputes were settled, Sue was auctioned in October 1997 for US$8.3 million (equivalent to about $17 million in 2025), at that time the highest price ever paid for a fossil, and still among the highest prices paid for a dinosaur skeleton. Sue is now a permanent feature at the Field Museum of Natural History in Chicago, Illinois.

== Discovery ==
During the summer of 1990, a group of workers from the Black Hills Institute, located in Hill City, searched for fossils at the Cheyenne River Indian Reservation in western South Dakota near the city of Faith. By the end of the summer, the group had discovered Edmontosaurus bones and was ready to leave.

However, a flat tire was discovered on their truck before the group could depart on August 12. While the rest of the group went into town to repair the truck, Sue Hendrickson decided to explore the nearby cliffs that the group had not checked. As she was walking along the base of a cliff, she discovered some small pieces of bone.

She looked above her to see where the bones had originated, and observed larger bones protruding from the wall of the cliff. She returned to camp with two small pieces of the bones and reported the discovery to the president of the Black Hills Institute, Peter Larson. He determined that the bones were from a T. rex by their distinctive contour and texture. Later, closer examination of the site showed many visible bones above the ground and some articulated vertebrae.

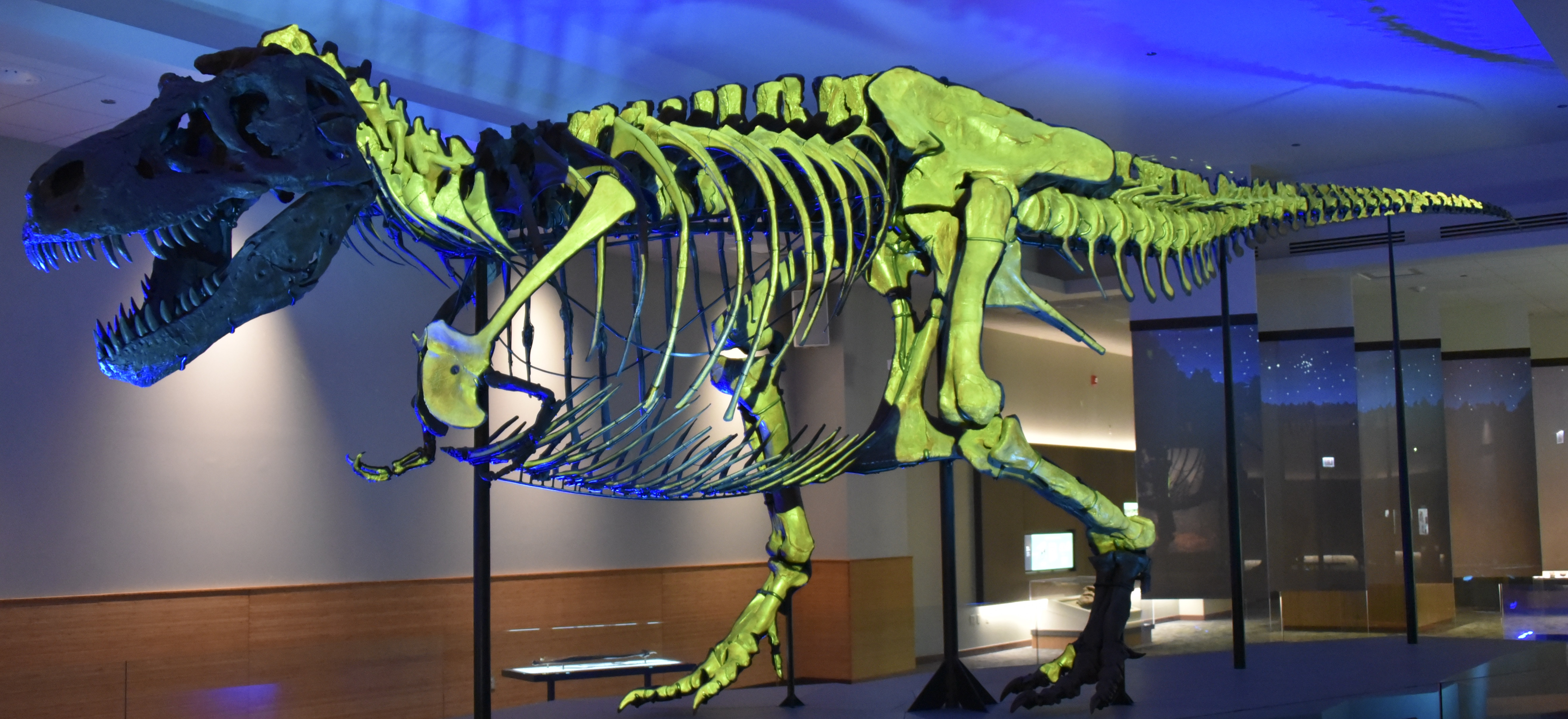
Highlighted green are the real fossilized bones. The real skull is displayed separately.

The crew ordered extra plaster and, although some of the crew had to depart, Hendrickson and a few other workers began to uncover the bones. The group was excited, as it was evident that much of the dinosaur had been preserved. Previously discovered T. rex skeletons were usually missing over half of their bones.

It was later determined that Sue was a record 90% complete by bulk, and 73% complete counting the elements. Of the 360 known T. rex bones, around 250 have been recovered. Scientists believe that this specimen was covered by water and mud soon after its death, which prevented other animals from carrying away the bones. Additionally, the rushing water mixed the skeleton together.

When the fossil was found, the hip bones were above the skull and the leg bones were intertwined with the ribs. The large size and the excellent condition of the bones were also surprising. The skull was 1.394 m (4 ft 6.9 in) long, and most of the teeth were still intact. After the group completed excavating the bones, each block was covered in burlap and coated in plaster, followed by a transfer to the offices of the Black Hills Institute, where they began to clean the bones.

== Dispute and auction ==
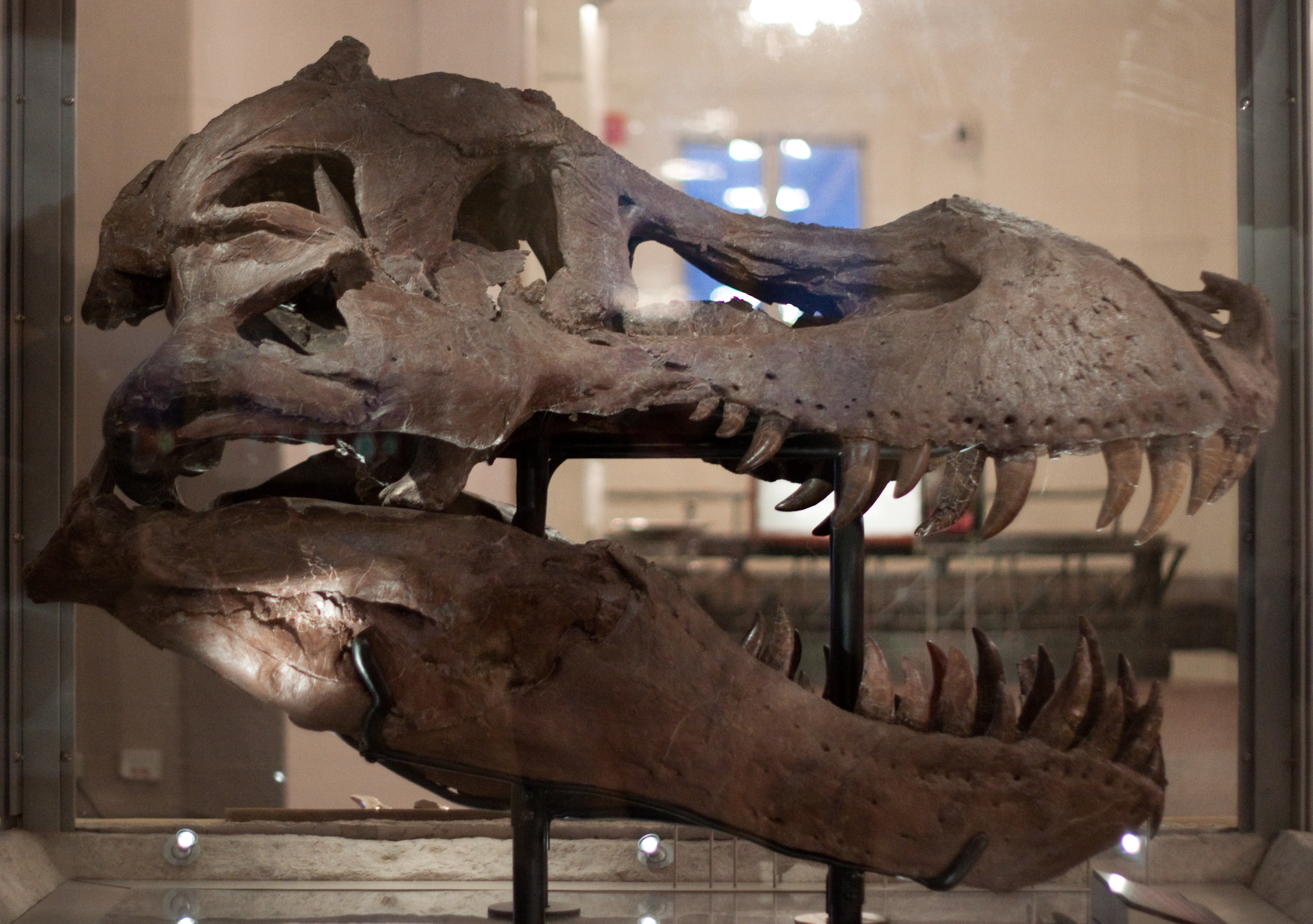
Sue's skull

Soon after the fossil was found, a dispute arose over legal ownership. The Black Hills Institute had obtained permission from the owner of the land, Maurice Williams, to excavate and remove the skeleton, and had paid Williams US$5,000 for the remains.

Williams later claimed that the money had not been for the sale of the fossil and that he had only allowed Larson to remove and clean the fossil for a later sale. Williams was a member of the Sioux tribe, and the tribe claimed the bones belonged to them. However, the property where the fossil had been found was held in trust by the United States Department of the Interior.

In 1992, the FBI and the South Dakota National Guard raided the site where the Black Hills Institute had been cleaning the bones and seized the fossil, charging Larson on 158 points. The government transferred the remains to the South Dakota School of Mines and Technology, where the skeleton was stored until the penal and civil legal disputes were settled. The United States Senate voted to not confirm the appointment of Kevin Schieffer as United States Attorney for the District of South Dakota after his controversial handling of the penal case.

In 1996, Larson was sentenced to a two-year prison sentence involving customs violations unrelated to the T. rex. After a lengthy civil case, the court decreed that Maurice Williams retained ownership. Williams then decided to sell the remains and contracted with Sotheby's to auction the specimen.

Many at the time worried that the fossil would end up in a private collection where people would not be able to observe it. The Field Museum in Chicago was also concerned about this possibility, and decided to attempt to purchase it. However, the organization realized that they might have had difficulty securing funding and requested that companies and private citizens provide financial support. The California State University system, Walt Disney Parks and Resorts, McDonald's, Ronald McDonald House Charities, and individual donors agreed to assist in purchasing Sue for the Field Museum.

On October 4, 1997, the auction began at US$500,000; less than ten minutes later, the Field Museum had purchased the remains with the highest bid of US$7.6 million, which eclipsed bids made on behalf of the Smithsonian's National Museum of Natural History and the North Carolina Museum of Natural Sciences. The final cost was US$8,362,500, making it the most expensive fossil ever sold up until that time. Sue remains one of the most expensive dinosaur fossils ever sold, only surpassed in 2020 with the sale of Stan the T. rex. for $31.8 million, and subsequently in 2024 by Apex the Stegosaurus, which sold for $44.6 million. And yet again in 2026 by a different Tyrannosaur by the name of Gus who sold for $50.1 million.

== Preparation ==
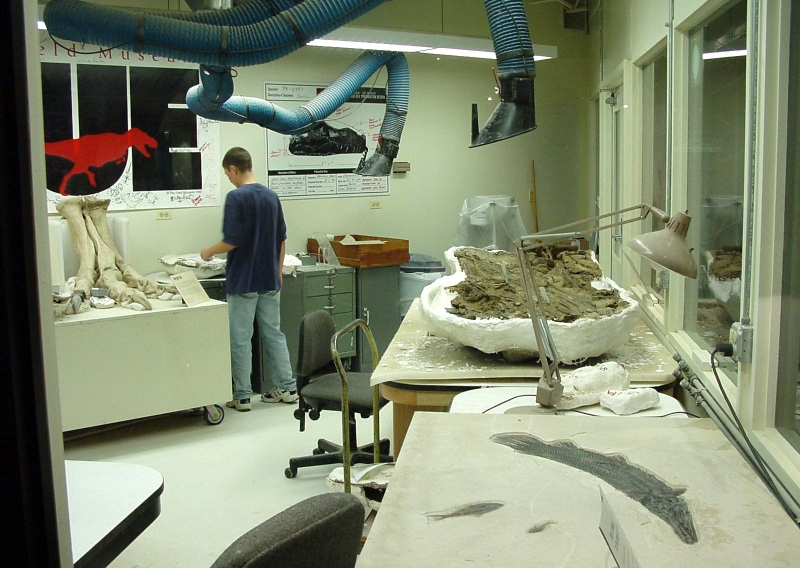
Field Museum Fossil Preparation Lab

The Field Museum hired a specialized moving company with experience in transporting delicate items to move the bones to Chicago. The truck arrived at the museum in October 1997. Two new research laboratories funded by McDonald's were created and staffed by Field Museum preparators whose job was to slowly and carefully remove all the rock, or "matrix", from the bones. One preparation lab was at the Field Museum itself, the other was at the newly opened Animal Kingdom in Disney World in Orlando. Millions of visitors observed the preparation of Sue's bones through glass windows in both labs. Footage of the work was also put on the museum's website.

Several of the fossil's bones had never been discovered, so preparators produced models of the missing bones from plastic to complete the exhibit. The modeled bones were colored in a purplish hue so that visitors could observe which bones were real and which bones were plastic. The preparators also poured molds of each bone. All the molds were sent to a company outside Toronto to be cast in hollow plastic. The Field Museum kept one set of disarticulated casts in its research collection. The other sets were incorporated into mounted cast skeletons. One set of the casts was sent to Disney's Animal Kingdom in Florida to be presented for public display. Two other mounted casts were placed into a traveling tour that was sponsored by the McDonald's Corporation.

Once the preparators finished removing the matrix from each bone, it was sent to the museum's photographer who made high-quality photographs. From there, the museum's paleontologists began the study of the skeleton. In addition to photographing and studying each bone, the research staff also arranged for CT scanning of select bones. The skull was too large to fit into a medical CT scanner, so Boeing's Rocketdyne laboratory in California agreed to let the museum use their CT scanner that was normally used to inspect space shuttle parts.

== Life and death ==
=== Bone damage ===
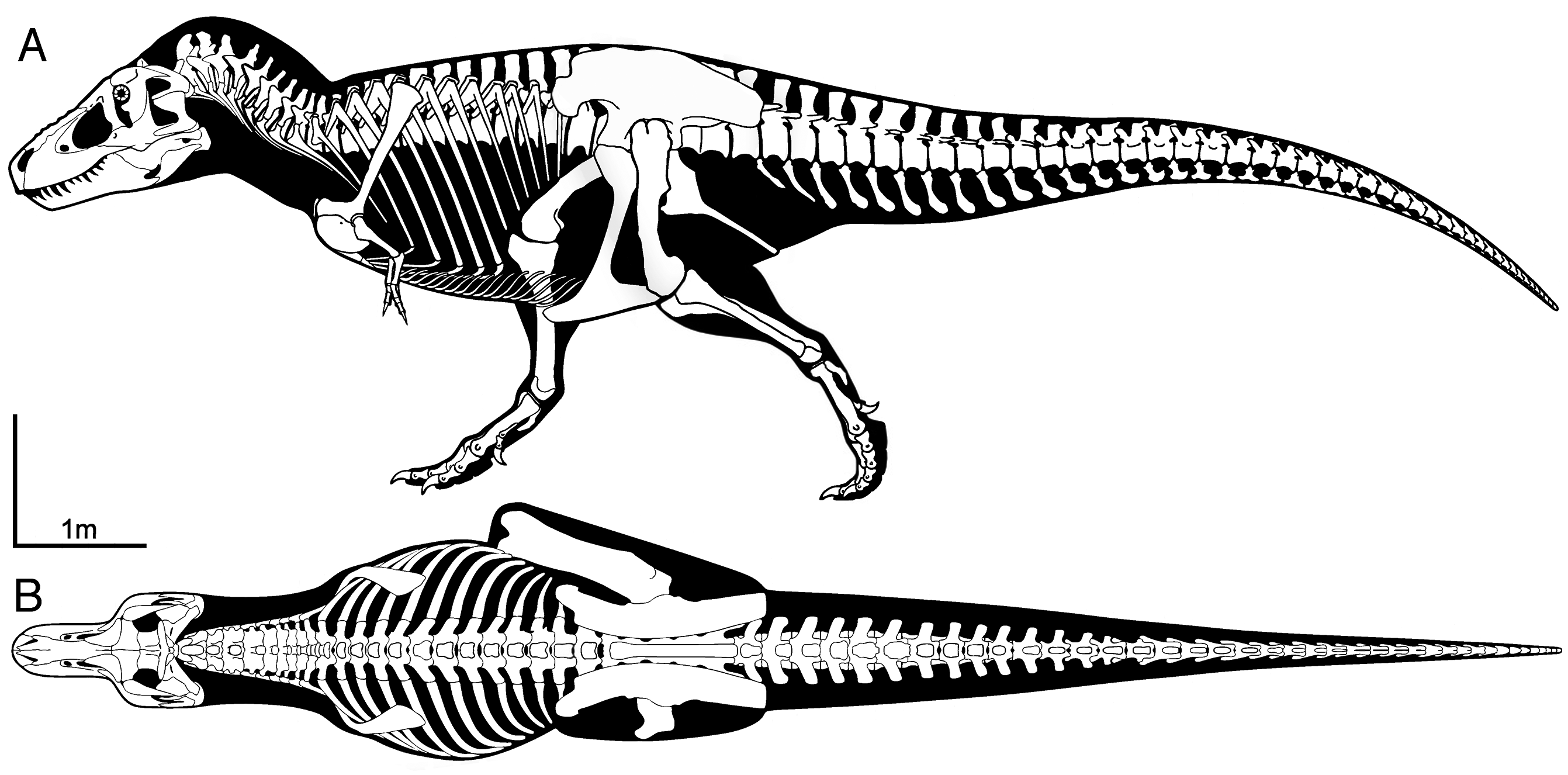
Skeletal reconstruction of Sue

Close examination of the bones revealed that Sue was 27–33 years old at the time of death (with 33 years old being the best-supported estimate in this range), making it the oldest known T. rex specimen currently published. This was originally estimated as 28 years old, with a later analysis updating the age estimate. In 2026, Woodward, Myhrvold, and Horner performed a comprehensive histological analysis of 17 tyrannosaur specimens including Sue, and argued that Tyrannosaurus likely experienced a more gradual annual growth rate slope than indicated by earlier studies and evidence of a protracted subadult stage, reaching asymptotic size at around 35–40 years of age. The authors found Sue itself spent at least 11 years at its adult size before dying.

During its life, Sue suffered from several injuries, including a damaged right shoulder blade, a torn tendon in the right arm most likely due to a struggle with prey, and three broken ribs. This damage subsequently healed (though one rib healed into two separate pieces), indicating Sue survived the incident.

Sue also suffered numerous other health afflictions. The fossil's left fibula is twice the diameter of the right one, likely the result of an infection. Originally the deformity was believed to be from a healed fracture, before later CT scans showed none. Both the misshapen left fibula and the fused c26 and c27 caudal vertebrae show signs consistent with the bone infection osteomyelitis. Several of Sue's tail vertebrae are fused in a pattern typical of arthritis due to injury. The animal is also believed to have suffered from gout.

Several holes in the front of Sue's skull were originally thought to be either from an infection or bite marks by another tyrannosaur. A 2009 study found these holes to be areas of parasitic infection, possibly from an infestation of an ancestral form of Trichomonas gallinae, a protozoan parasite that infests birds and ultimately leads to death by starvation due to internal swelling of the neck. Damage to the back end of the skull was interpreted early on as a fatal bite wound, but subsequent study by Field Museum paleontologists found no bite marks. The distortion and breakage seen in some of the bones in the back of the skull was likely caused by post-mortem trampling.

Sue's cause of death is ultimately unknown. The dinosaur died in a seasonal stream bed, which washed away some small bones as it rapidly covered the remains with sediment, ultimately leading to fossilization.

=== Size ===
"Sue" and other specimens to scale with a human

Sue is approximately 12.3–12.8 meters (40.4–42.0 ft) long along the centra, and stands 3.66–3.96 meters (12–13 ft) tall at the hips. Sue is one of the largest Tyrannosaurus specimens, only possibly exceeded by Scotty (RSM P2523.8).

Sue possesses the longest known gastralium (belly rib) among theropods, measuring about 90 centimeters (3.0 ft). Sue also has the longest known pubis currently measured among the Cretaceous theropods, measuring roughly 136 centimeters (4.46 ft).

=== Weight ===
Sue has been estimated to have weighed between 8.4–14 metric tons (9.26–15.4 short tons) when living, as of 2018. In 2011, other weight estimates were between 5,560–10,011 kilograms (6.13–11.0 short tons), although the authors stated that their upper and lower estimates were based on models with wide possible errors, and that they "consider them [these extremes] to be too skinny, too fat, or too disproportionate". A further estimate portrayed a leaner build, placing the specimen at 8.4 metric tons (9.3 short tons), while older estimates have placed this specimen at 5.7–6.4 metric tons (6.3–7.1 short tons) in weight. A study conducted back in 2014 that estimated the weight for some of the large theropod dinosaurs and both Sue and Scotty were included. This older study concluded that Sue was around 7,377 kg (8.1 tons) with a weight range of 5,531 kg (6 tons) to 9,224 kg (10 tons) while Scotty was heavier at 8,004 kg (8.8 tons) with a weight range of 6,000 kg (6.6 tons) to 10,007 kg (11 tons).

Displayed separately from the whole body, the skull weighs 272 kg (600 lb).

== Exhibition ==
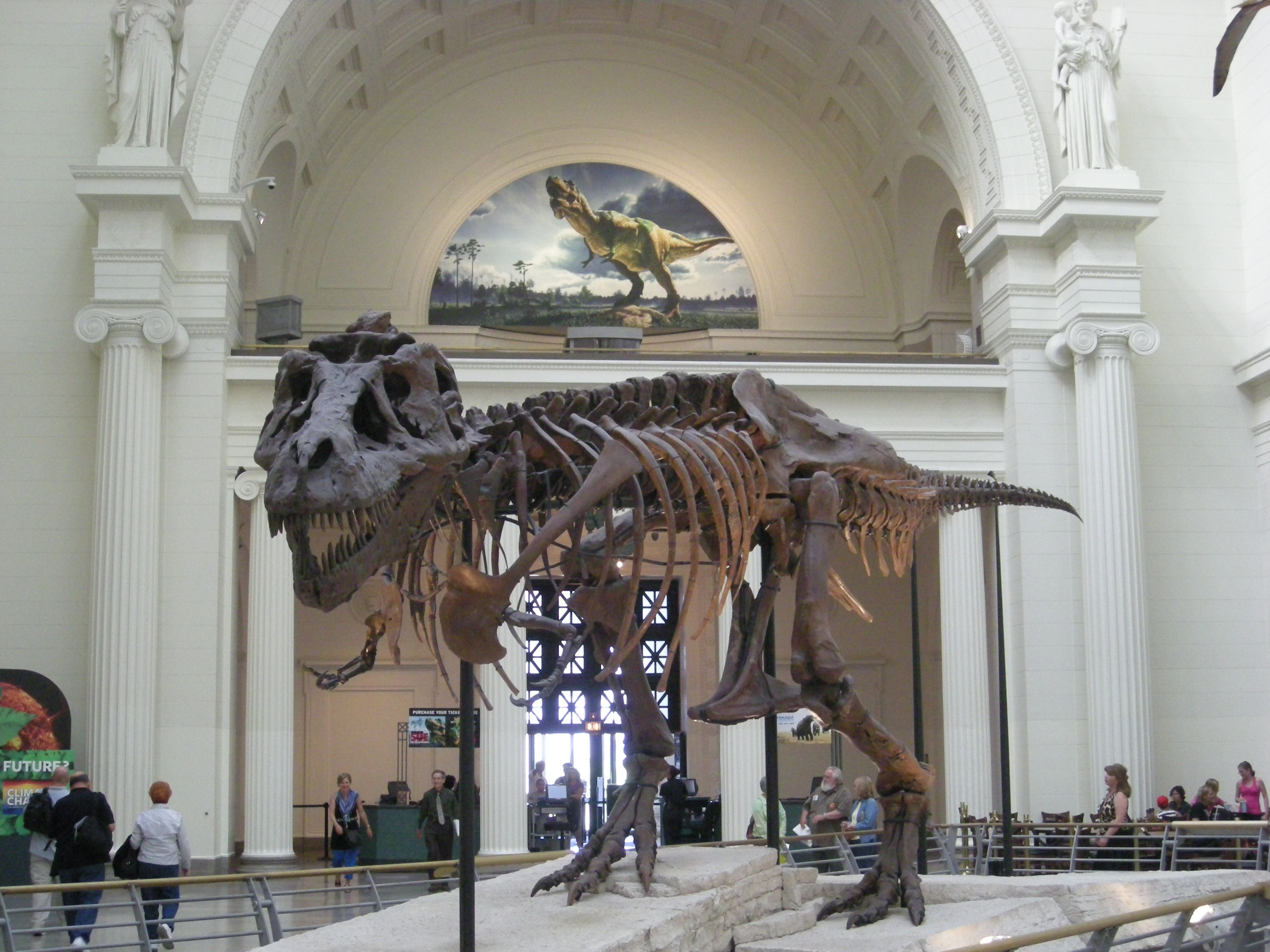
Sue as originally mounted in Stanley Field Hall

Following preparation, photography, and study, the bones were sent to New Jersey in mid-November of 1999, where construction—headed by Phil Fraley—began on making the mount. Sue's mount consists of a bent steel frame which supports each bone safely, displaying the skeleton fully articulated as it was in life.

The dinosaur's real skull was not incorporated into the mounted display, as subsequent study would be difficult with the head 4 m (13 ft) off the ground. Additionally, parts of the skull had been crushed and broken and thus appeared distorted. The museum made a cast of the skull, and altered this cast to remove the distortions, thus approximating what the original undistorted skull may have looked like. The cast skull was also lighter, allowing it to be displayed on the mount without the use of a steel upright under the head. The original skull was exhibited in a separate case, which could be opened to allow researchers access for study.

Originally, the Field Museum had plans to incorporate Sue into their preexisting dinosaur exhibit on the second floor, but had little left in their budget to do so after purchasing it. Instead, the T. rex was put on display in the building's main hall directly in front of the museum's north entrance, where it would remain for the next 18 years.

Sue was unveiled on May 17, 2000, attracting over 10,000 visitors that day. John Gurche, a paleoartist, painted a mural of a Tyrannosaurus for the exhibit.

=== New suite (2019) ===
VOA report about Sue's new exhibit in 2018

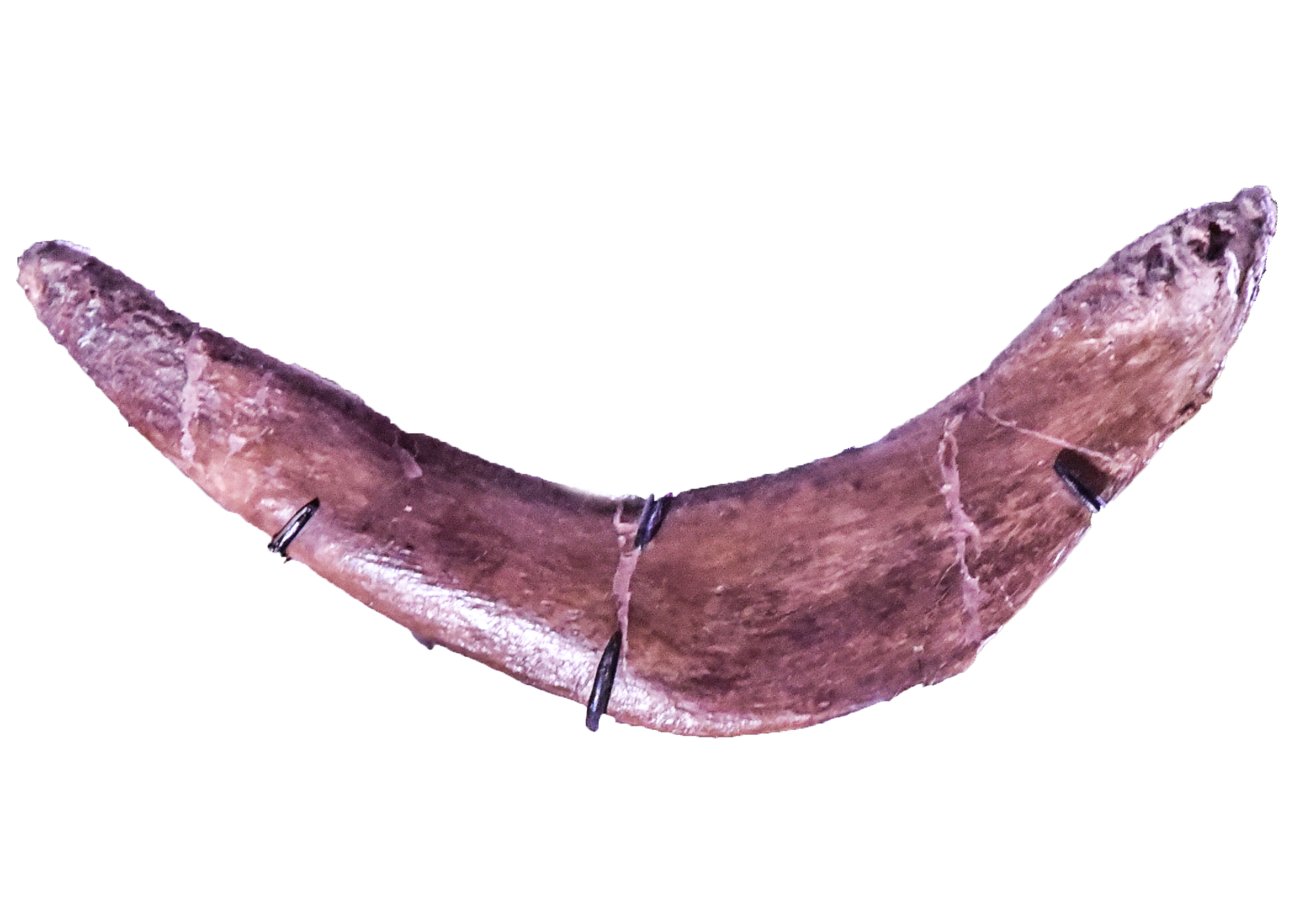
With the correct furcula in place, the shoulders are lowered and meet in the middle of the chest – bringing the arms closer to the ground.

In early 2018, Sue was dismantled and moved to its own gallery on the museum's upper level, connected to the Evolving Planet exhibit and the Elizabeth Morse Genius Hall of Dinosaurs. The new exhibit opened on December 21, 2018.

The 5,100-square-foot (470 m^{2}) exhibit includes animated videos of Sue that are projected in 6K onto nine-foot tall panes behind its skeleton. Atlantic Productions worked with the Field Museum to create multiple animated sequences, including Sue scavenging an Ankylosaurus carcass, battling a Triceratops, and hunting an Edmontosaurus.

According to the Field Museum's associate curator of dinosaurs Pete Makovicky, the new suite was designed to accentuate the size and stature of Sue, and although smaller, the exhibit allows for a more intimate display of the T. rex, along with the skull of a Triceratops and other Cretaceous period artifacts, such as shark teeth and pachycephalosaurid bones.

Sue's reassembled display is intended to reflect the newest scientific theories, including the proper furcula and attachment of the gastralia to the rest of the skeleton.

Sue's real skull is kept in a separate display case in the exhibition, allowing it to be removed for study as required.

== Tyrannosaurus imperator debate ==
In a 2022 study, Gregory S. Paul and colleagues argued that Tyrannosaurus rex, as traditionally understood, actually represents three species: the type species Tyrannosaurus rex, and two new species: T. imperator (meaning "tyrant lizard emperor") and T. regina (meaning "tyrant lizard queen"). The holotype of the former (T. imperator) is the Sue specimen, and the holotype of the latter (T. regina) is Wankel rex. Paul interpreted Sue to represent an earlier population of Tyrannosaurus, which speciated into T. rex and T. regina.

However, the majority of paleontologists who have extensively studied the clade expressed skepticism or criticized the study’s methodology and conclusions in mass media. Critics included Stephen Brusatte, Thomas Carr, Thomas Holtz, David Hone, Jingmai O'Connor, and Lindsay Zanno. Their criticism was subsequently published in a technical paper. Holtz remarked that, even if Tyrannosaurus imperator represented a distinct species from Tyrannosaurus rex, it may represent the same species as Nanotyrannus lancensis and would need to be called Tyrannosaurus lancensis. O'Connor, a curator at the Field Museum, where the T. imperator holotype Sue is displayed, regarded the new species as too poorly supported to justify modifying the exhibit signs.

== See also ==
- Big John (dinosaur)
- Black Beauty (dinosaur)
- Dippy
- Jane (dinosaur)
- Peck's Rex
- Specimens of Tyrannosaurus
- Stan (dinosaur)
- Scotty (dinosaur)
- Timeline of tyrannosaur research
- Trix (dinosaur)
- List of dinosaur specimens sold at auction
