= Trix (dinosaur) =

Tyrannosaurus rex specimen

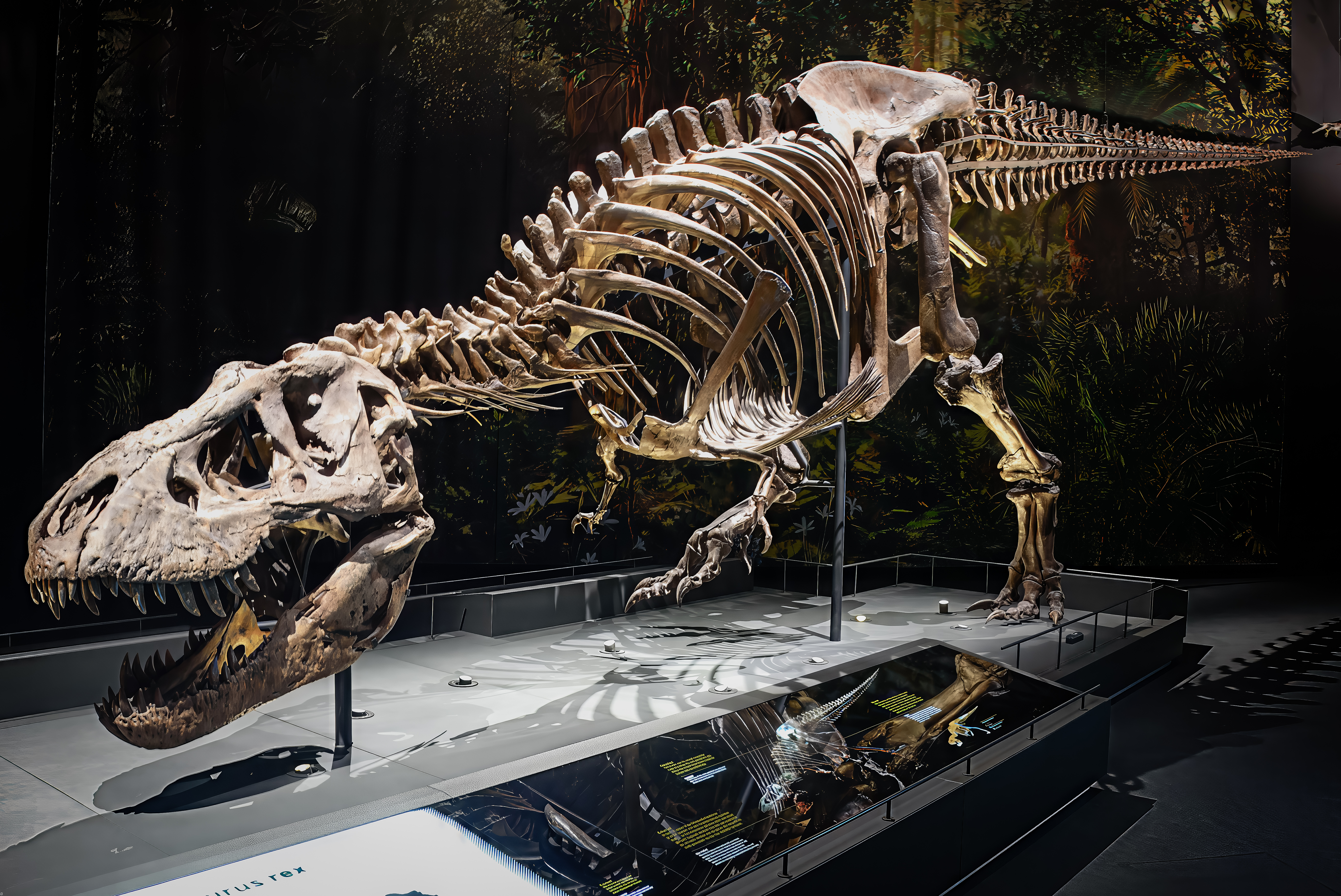
- Trix on display at the Naturalis Biodiversity Center, Leiden
- Catalog no.: RGM 792.000
- Common name: Trix
- Species: Tyrannosaurus rex
- Age: c. 67 million years (aged c. 30)
- Place discovered: Montana, United States
- Date discovered: 27 May 2013
- Discovered by: Blaine Lunstad

Trix is a Tyrannosaurus rex specimen excavated in 2013 in Montana, United States by a team of paleontologists from the Naturalis Biodiversity Center in Leiden, the Netherlands and Black Hills Institute of Geological Research in South Dakota. This Tyrannosaurus, over thirty years old – the oldest known Tyrannosaurus specimen – lived around 67 million years ago. It is considered to be the third most complete Tyrannosaurus found, with between 78% and 80% of its bone volume recovered. The specimen was named Trix after the former Queen Beatrix of the Netherlands. It is one of only two Tyrannosaurus specimens on permanent exhibit in mainland Europe. The other one is a specimen named Tristan on exhibit at the Natural History Museum of Berlin.

At Naturalis, Trix has the accession or inventory number "RGM 792.000" in which "RGM" refers to the Rijksmuseum van Geologie en Mineralogie, one of the former museums that merged to form the constituent parts of Naturalis.

== Discovery ==
In 2012, Naturalis Biodiversity Center at Leiden, the largest natural history museum of the Netherlands, planned to open a new exhibition hall in 2017. In order to increase the structural number of visitors from 300,000 to 400,000 per annum, the management decided to try and procure an authentic Tyrannosaurus skeleton, preferably one excavated by the museum itself. In September 2012, a museum delegation travelled to the United States to contact the Black Hills Institute, a company that had been involved in nine Tyrannosaurus excavations. As it happened, the BHI had just received a report from a farmer in Wyoming about a Tyrannosaurus discovery. Senior Naturalis paleontologist John de Vos immediately visited the site and identified the remains as those of Tyrannosaurus. As it was late in the season, it was decided to postpone the excavation until the next Spring. In April and May 2013, the site was thoroughly excavated, but apart from some foot bones, a skeleton proved to be absent. However, five Triceratops skeletons were present elsewhere on the farm land and procured by the museum for exhibition.

On the evening of 27 May 2013, Blaine Lunstad, an amateur paleontologist, and his wife Michele Lunstad who is of Dutch descent, stumbled upon some bones in the "East Pasture", part of the land of farmer Lige M. Murray, fifty kilometres south of Jordan, Montana. Local fossil hunter Clayton "Dino Cowboy" Phipps confirmed that it was a tyrannosaur skeleton. Rumours of the find reached the BHI, which informed Naturalis. In August 2013, a team of paleontologists from the Naturalis Biodiversity Center, now headed by Anne Schulp, again travelled to the United States. From 29 August to 9 September they unearthed a big and remarkably complete Tyrannosaurus rex specimen. The fossil was found in the Hell Creek Formation. The pattern of geomagnetic reversal showed it had an age of at least 67 million years. The excellent preservation had been caused by the skeleton being surrounded by a three metres thick sandstone lens with a high chalk content, neutralising damaging acids. The Black Hills Institute collaborated with the team in the excavation, which was also assisted by Phipps and the Lundstads. On 5 September, paleontologist Philip Manning of the University of Manchester performed a lidar-laserscan of the site surface to precisely determine the position of all bones.

In May 2015, a CAT-scan of the skull was made in a large industrial scanner of the Fraunhofer Entwicklungszentrum Röntgentechnik of the Fraunhofer Institut at Fürth in Germany.

== Description ==
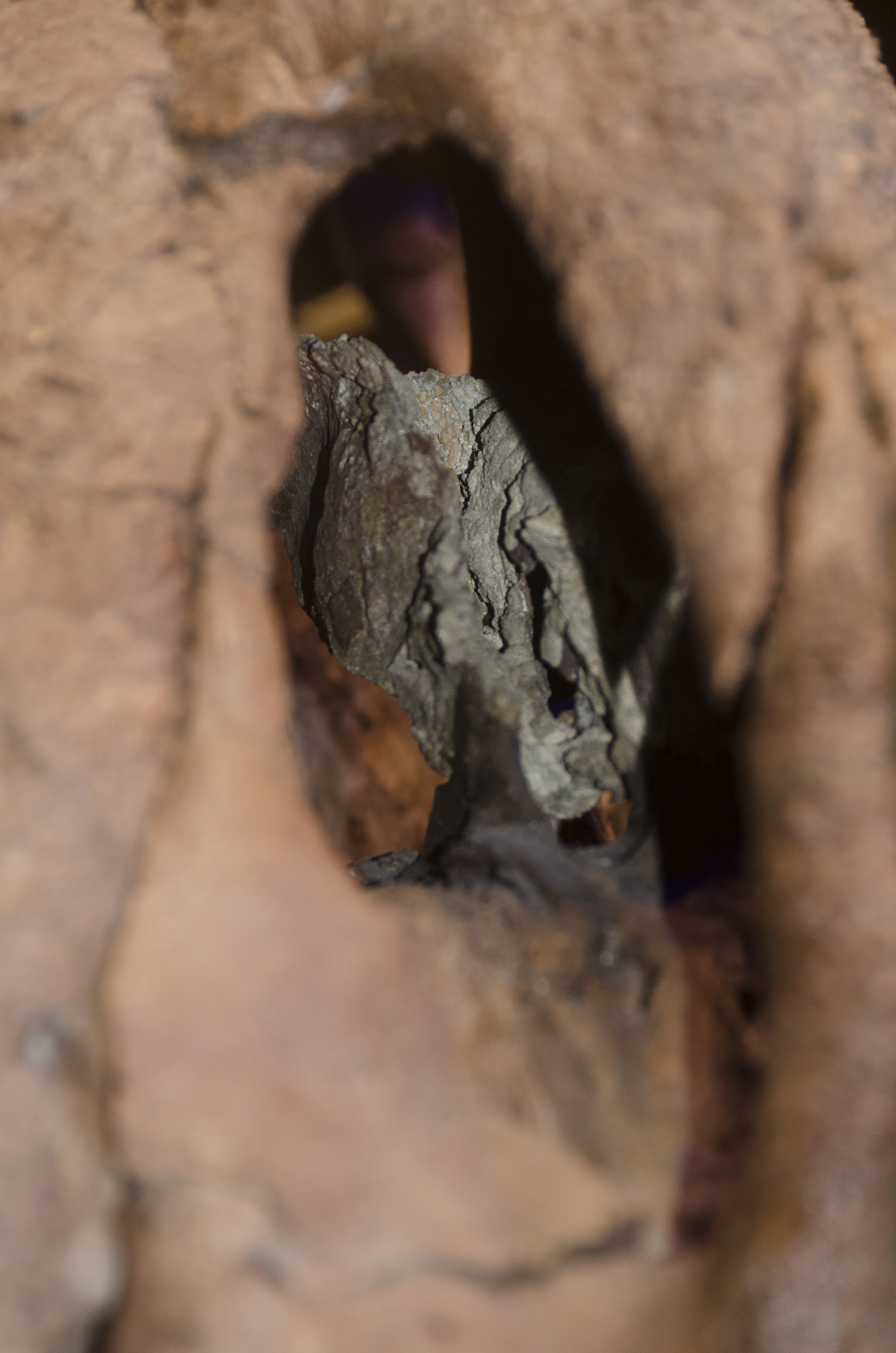
The turbinal

According to Peter Larson, director of the Black Hills Institute, Trix is the third most complete Tyrannosaurus found, after Sue and Stan. About half of the bones have been found. These represent between 75% and 80% of its bone volume. The main missing parts include the tip of the snout, the front lower jaws, at least seven vertebrae of the middle tail, the point of the tail, the right shoulder blade, the arms, the left hindlimb and the right foot. Parts never before discovered in a Tyrannosaurus fossil include a turbinal bone in the nasal cavity. A rare element present is the furcula and the stapes of the ear. There is some root damage from plant growth and some bones had been gnawed by scavengers. A smaller shed tooth was found, attributed to Nanotyrannus. Trix in 2016 was the most complete Tyrannosaurus specimen permanently exhibited outside of the United States. Tyrannosaurus skeletons part of the collection of the Natural History Museum, London, are more fragmentary. Tristan, a skeleton on display in Berlin's Museum für Naturkunde since 2015 (a long-term loan to the museum by its private owner), has around 56% of the original bones, which is slightly more than Trix. Trix is approximately 12.5–13 meters (41.0–42.7 ft) long along the centra, and stands 4 meters (13 ft) tall at the hips. Trix has been estimated to have weighed between 5 metric tons (5.51 short tons) when living, as of 2017.

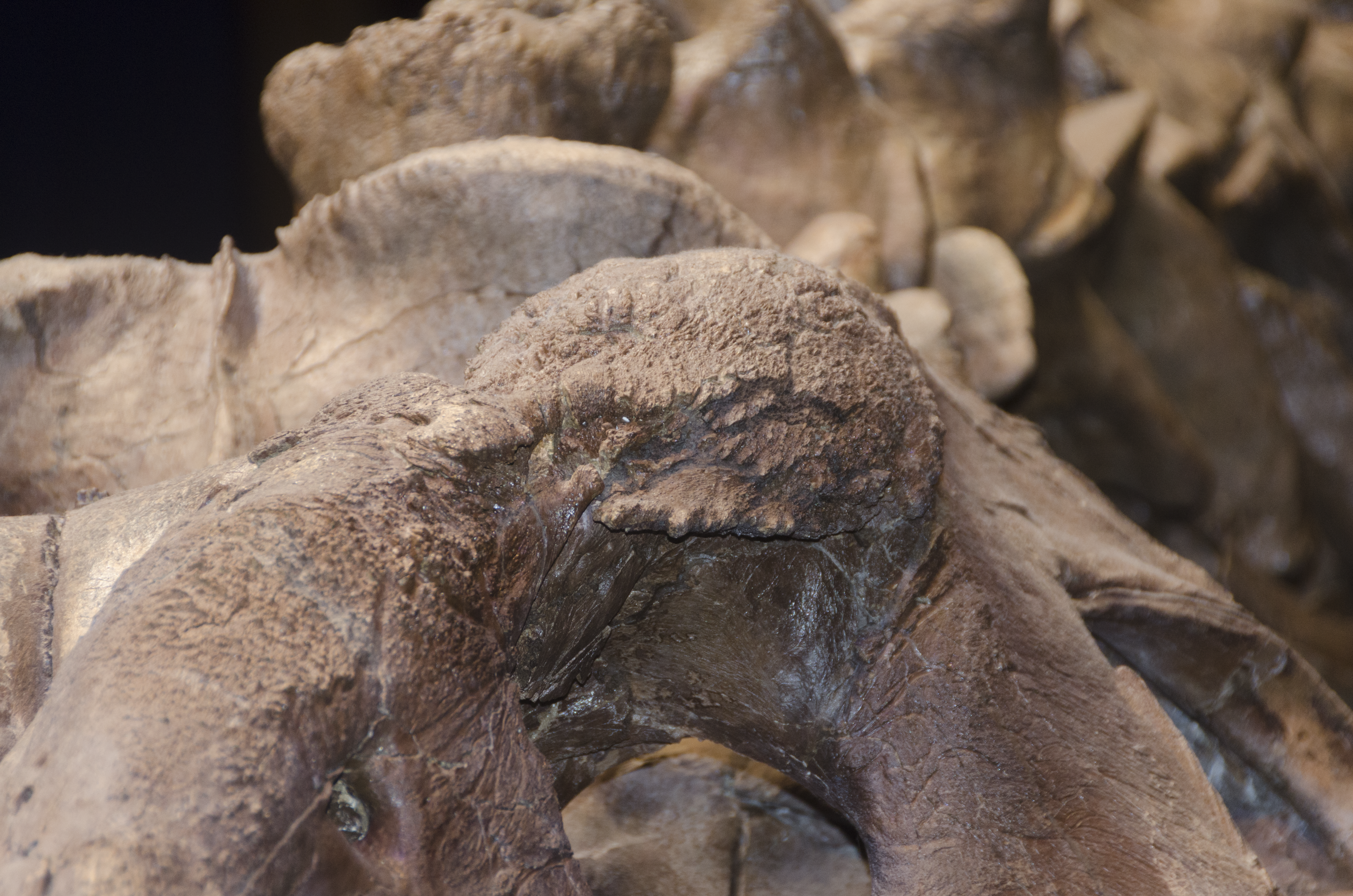
The large postorbital boss may prove that Trix is female

Due to its very large size and robust build, as well as a thickened postorbital bone, it has been suggested that Trix belongs to the robust, instead of the gracile, morphotype. However, the existence of these categories has been doubted and debated several times. The BHI classified Trix as a female, since they and several researchers theorize that a higher robustness is indicative of belonging to the female sex.

=== Age ===
Trix's age has been estimated by counting the growth lines in the bones. Two different methods were used for this: an X-ray microtomography, which can be done without damaging the bones, and a very small hole drilled in the fibula to allow comparison with the results of the X-ray based technique. This study was carried out in collaboration with Sifra Bijl, from the Vrije Universiteit Amsterdam, and Koen Stein, a Belgian researcher from the Free University of Brussels, and attached to the Royal Belgian Institute of Natural Sciences. The growth lines were numerous, and difficult to distinguish. These facts alongside the roughness and rugosity of the skull are indications that this individual had reached an old age for a T. rex; in this case at least 30 years, as opposed to Sue's 28 years (which was the second oldest specimen known until now), making Trix the oldest Tyrannosaurus known. Subsequent analysis has updated the age estimate, placing Sue between 27-33 years old at the time of her death, making her the oldest T. rex specimen ever published, and Trix the second-oldest known.

=== Diseases ===
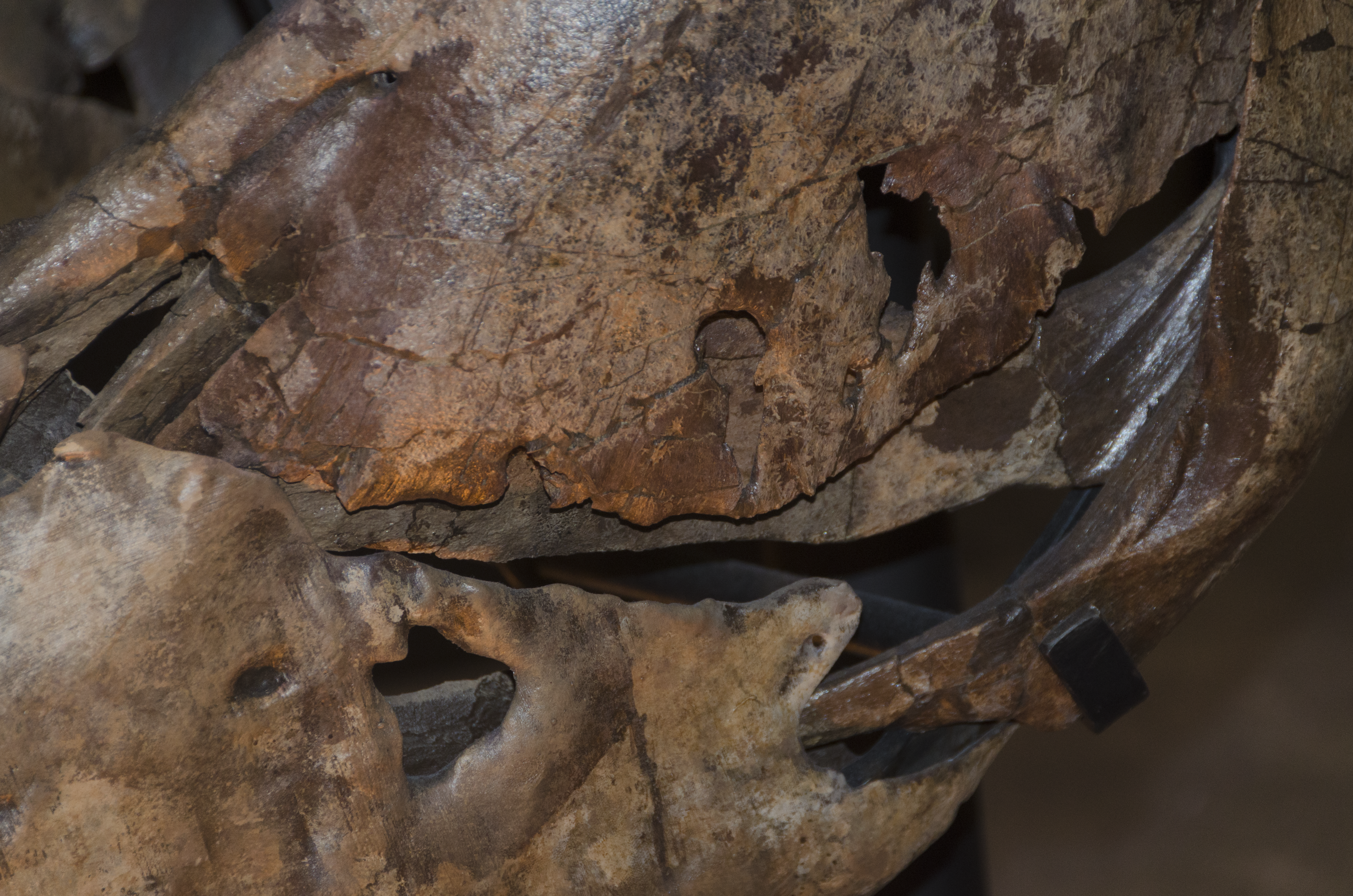
Puncture holes in the left surangular

During the excavation, the paleontologists found indications of a variety of disorders and damage to the bones. These suggest that during her long life, this Tyrannosaurus survived a number of illnesses and suffered various injuries. The right lower leg bone and one of the ribs show evidence of distorted growth, suggesting a fracture or infection. The jaws also suffered considerable damage. She experienced an infection in the right upper jaw and there are bite traces in the surangular of the left lower jaw. This may have been caused by a male T. rex during mating, or may be the result of a fight. Other clues that suggest combat with other T. rex are a recovered bite wound on the right upper jaw, and a series of partially healed scratch marks on the left upper jaw. The last of these injuries was suffered just a few weeks prior to her death. The sacrum and the first tail vertebra show uneven development which could suggest either a birth defect or an injury suffered at a very young age. A number of other inconsistencies were discovered in the caudal vertebrae. At least four ribs had been broken and healed.

== Preparation ==
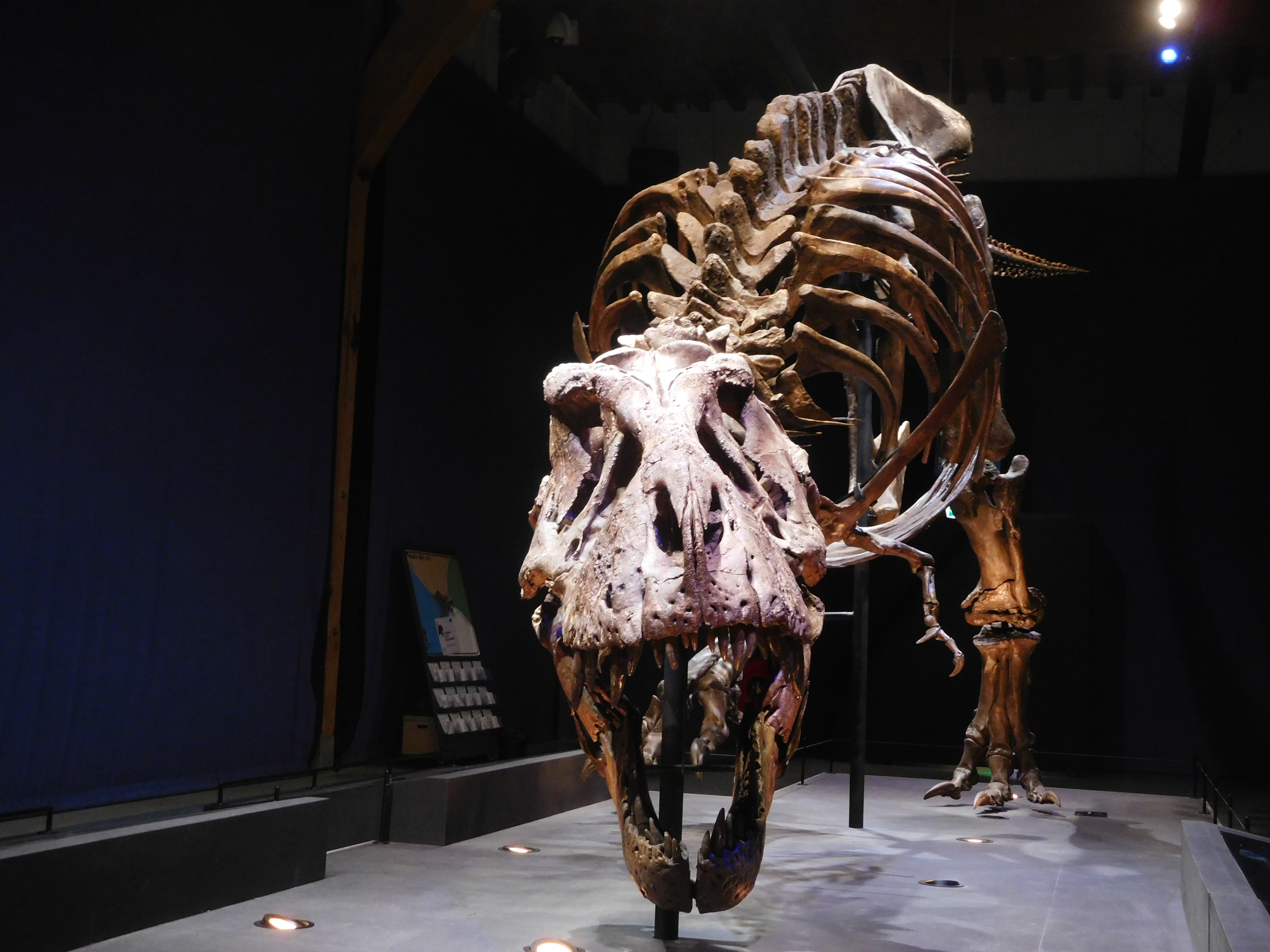
Trix has her original skull mounted

The bones were cleaned and assembled in a mount at the Black Hills Institute's installations, with the help of both Chicago's Field Museum of Natural History and the Naturalis Leiden Museum. Chicago's Field museum sent digital models of their famous specimen, FMNH PR 2081 (Sue), to complete the cast and the Naturalis museum replicated the arms and foot bones using 3D printing technology. Damaged vertebrae were completed using those of Stan as an example. In printing, the left hindlimb and the right shoulder blade were mirrored from their opposite counterparts. Missing teeth were replaced by inserting real fossil Tyrannosaurus teeth of the appropriate morphology and size.

Trix is currently being presented in a unique, low to the ground running pose which allows use of her actual skull instead of a replica, which has required a substantial amount of support that cannot be achieved with a more traditional pose. It is the only Tyrannosaurus specimen alongside MOR 980 (Peck's Rex) in which the mount includes the real skull fossilized bones. Also some of the actual gastralia or belly ribs were used, which had been found in articulation with the remainder of the ribcage, allowing for a particularly realistic restoration of the thorax.

The decision to use replicas from Sue for filling several missing body parts such as the feet, was made due to Sue being roughly of the same length and robusticity, and the fact that they both have been estimated to be very old for a Tyrannosaurus. Most estimates suggest sizes from 12 (39.5 ft) to 12.5 meters in length (41 ft).

== Name ==
For formal use, the BHI referred to the skeleton as the "Murray T. rex". Because of her age, sex, and face injuries, the tyrannosaur was nicknamed "grandma pusface". Naturalis preferred Grand Old Lady. Wim Pijbes, the director of the Amsterdam Rijksmuseum, called the skeleton "the Nightwatch of Natural History". She has also been called the "Mona Lisa of Naturalis", because of her enigmatic smile. Both Larson and the museum concluded it was "the most beautiful Tyrannosaurus of the world". Naturalis decided that the skeleton needed an official name, as all main exemplars of Tyrannosaurus possess. In the press, it was speculated it would be called "Michelle" after its discoverer, as had happened with many specimens. Naturalis asked the Dutch public to suggest a name. On 23 June 2016 it was announced that the name overwhelmingly chosen was "Trix", as both an allusion to "T-rex" and former Queen Beatrix of the Netherlands. Trix thus became known as the "Queen of the Cretaceous".

== Exhibition T. rex in Town ==
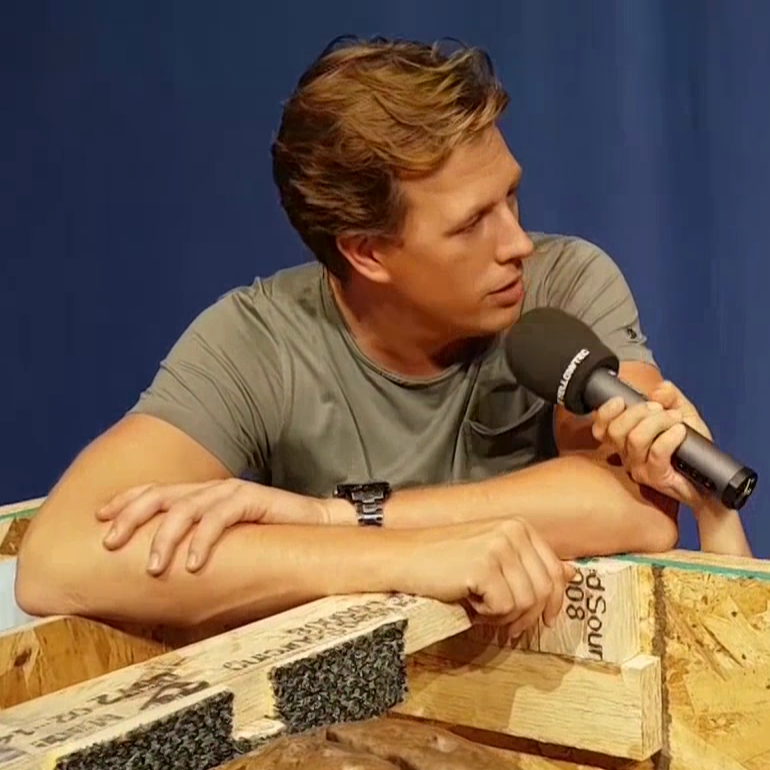
Freek Vonk admiring the snout of Trix in an opened crate

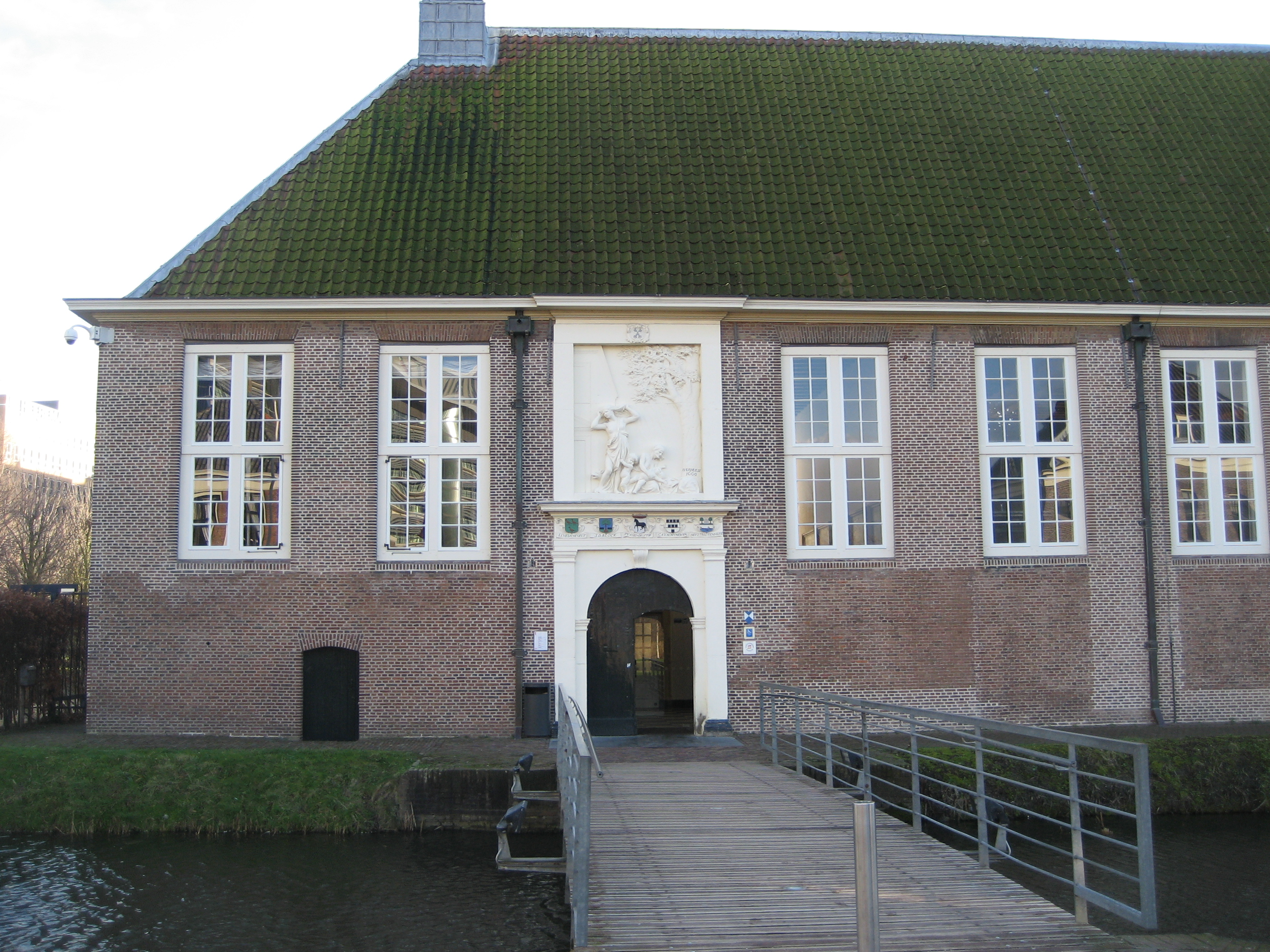
The 17th-century Pesthuis

T. rex in Town is a temporary itinerant exhibition that happened for the first time from 10 September 2016 to 5 June 2017 in the Naturalis Biodiversity Center in Leiden, The Netherlands. After travelling through different European countries in 2017, 2018 and 2019, T. rex in Town last visited Glasgow, Scotland, from 18 April 2019 to 31 July 2019 at the Kelvin Hall building. After that, the specimen returned to the Naturalis museum, to be installed on its final allocated location, a special hall that was under construction during Trix's European tour. Trix's reconstruction started on 5 August 2019.

In August 2016, the Trix mount was disassembled for transport and on 23 August flown from Chicago to Schiphol by KLM, packed in nine crates. After a festive public reception on the city square of Leiden on 26 August, led by Dutch wildlife expert and television personality Freek Vonk, the skeleton was reassembled by Pete Larson for exhibition. The exhibit was staged in the historic Pesthuis ("Plague House") entrance building, while the main museum building was under renovation until the new paleontology hall would be opened, which at the time was envisaged for 2018. During the first six months of the exhibition, it attracted 379,119 visitors. One year later, in the Summer of 2018, the Paris exhibition in France reached the number of 338,683 visitors during the first four months, an average number of 2,480 visitors a day.

From September 2016 to July 2019, the complete list of itinerant exhibitions is as follows (with local modified names in the cases of Salzburg, Barcelona and Paris):

- Leiden, Netherlands: "T. rex in Town" (10 September 2016 – 6 June 2017)
- Salzburg, Austria: "T. rex in Salzburg" * (23 June 2017 – 16 October 2017)
- Barcelona, Spain: "Què li va passar a la Trix?" * (27 October 2017 – 25 February 2018)
- Paris, France: "Un T. rex à Paris" * (6 June 2018 – 2 September 2018; finally extended to 4 November 2018)
- Macao, China: (cancelled, replaced by Lisbon)
- Lisbon, Portugal: "T. rex in Town" (15 December 2018 – 31 March 2019)
- Glasgow, Scotland: "T. rex in Town" (18 April 2019 – 31 July 2019)

* Local names: "T. rex in Salzburg" is German for the same meaning in English. "Què li va passar a la Trix?" is Catalan for "What Happened to Trix?". "Un T. rex à Paris" is French for "A T. rex in Paris".

== Subsequent study ==
In 2021, a study of Trix by Pasha van Bijlert and Knoek van Soest concluded that when the energy use during a walking phase was minimized by optimizing the elastic energy in a swaying tail, the resulting step frequency indicated a preferred walking speed of about 1.28 meters per second (4.6 km/h; 2.9 mph), less than previously assumed for large theropods.

== Financial aspects ==
During its initial negotiations with Murray, Naturalis obtained an option of purchase, the eventual buying price to be determined by the completeness of the skeleton. When more and more bones surfaced, it became clear that the museum had endeavoured on a project of considerable cost, estimated at seven million euros in November 2013. Only one million euros could be covered by the institution's financial reserves. The remainder was raised by a combination of private gifts, municipal and state subsidies, and charity donations. Naturalis promoted a "Tientje voor T. rex" (Tenner for T. Rex) campaign to raise funds for bringing Trix to Leiden. About 23,000 individuals, mainly children, contributed ten euros. About sixty companies "adopted" a bone. Late 2014, the purchase could be made. The procurement costs, including preparation and legal advice, were indicated at €4,291,466. At that moment, Naturalis owed the BHI €1,027,556. These numbers did not include the costs of exhibition and promotion.

Naturalis tried to increase the public awareness of the specimen, a crucial factor in attaining the projected number of visitors. Part of the campaign was a dinosaur sticker book action by the Dutch largest supermarket chain, Albert Heijn, centred on the new skeleton and using Wikipedia images. In September 2016 Dutch media reported that Trix's arrival in Leiden had resulted in €1.3 million of "free publicity" for the museum. PostNL issued a souvenir sheet containing a special stamp series of three.

As earlier with Sue, a legal dispute has arisen about the initial ownership of the specimen. Under the law of Montana, land property can be made a split estate, i.e. split between a surface estate and a mineral estate. While Murray had the surface rights, two thirds of the mineral rights were held by the Billings Garfield Land Company; the remainder was divided by Murray and former landowners Jerry and Robert Severson. On 21 August 2014, the Seversons claimed in court that the skeleton was a mineral because fossils are mineralised. However, on 20 May 2016, the U.S. District Court for the District of Montana ruled against them, considering that in normal parlance a dinosaur is not a mineral. Subsequently, the Seversons appealed to the Ninth Circuit U.S. Court of Appeals. Until the matter was settled, the money Naturalis paid, was held in escrow. On 6 November 2018, the Court of Appeals ruled in favour of the Seversons. In June 2020, the Ninth Circuit U.S. Court of Appeals reversed course, ruling that the fossils belonged to the Murrays. This came after the Montana Supreme Court determined that fossils are not minerals under Montana state law and thus belong to the surface estate.

== See also ==
- List of dinosaur specimens with nicknames
- Specimens of Tyrannosaurus
- Sue (dinosaur)
- Stan (dinosaur)
- Scotty (dinosaur)
