= Black Hills Institute of Geological Research =

Geological research company in South Dakota, United States

Black Hills Institute of Geological Research, Inc.
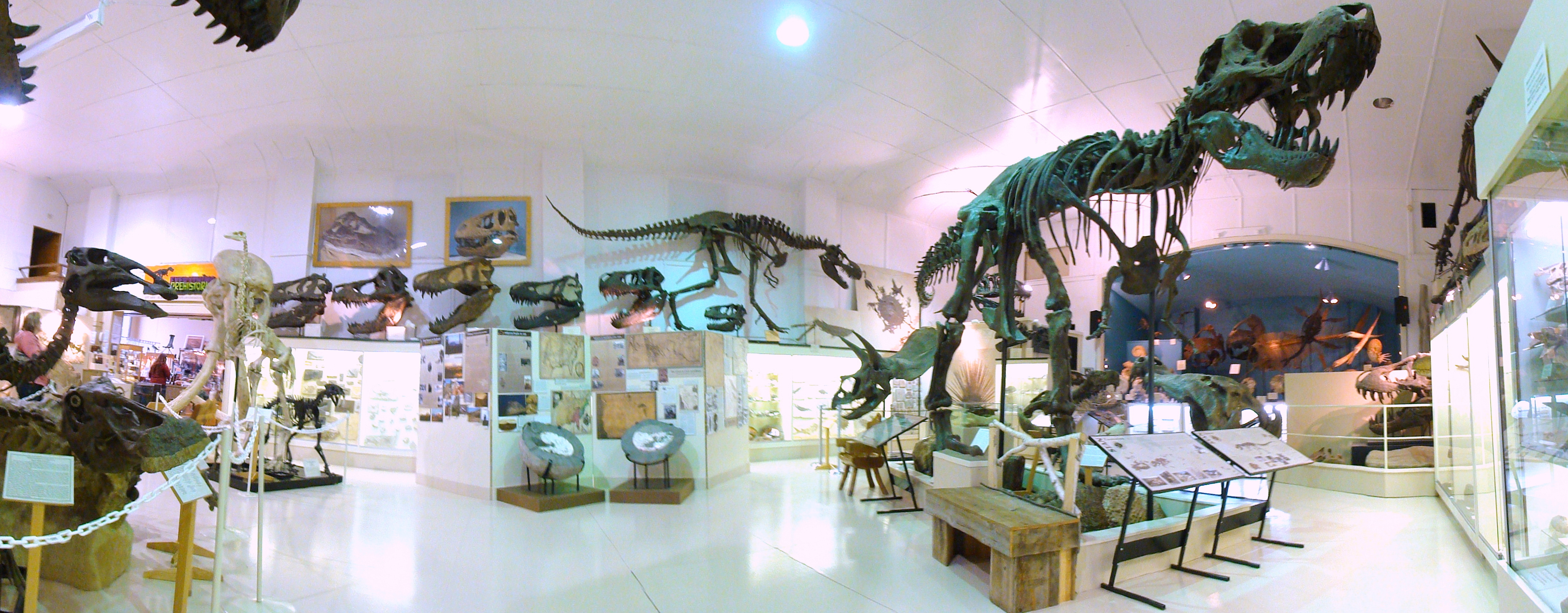
- Photo of the original Stan Fossil (on the right) was taken at Black Hills Institute of Geological Research
- Industry: Fossil excavation
- Founded: 1974; 51 years ago
- Headquarters: Hill City, South Dakota, United States
- Website: bhigr.com

The Black Hills Institute of Geological Research, Inc. (BHI) is a private corporation specializing in the excavation and preparation of fossils, as well as the sale of both original fossil material and museum-quality replicas. Founded in 1974 and based in Hill City, South Dakota, the company is most famous for excavating and selling replicas of some of the most complete specimens of Tyrannosaurus rex, including "Sue", "Stan", and "Trix".

The Black Hills Museum of Natural History

In March 1992, BHI owners founded the Black Hills Museum of Natural History in Hill City, a non-profit paleontological museum which is controlled by an independent Board of Directors.

In May 1992, the remains of "Sue" were seized from the BHI by the Federal Bureau of Investigation and were auctioned off five years later to the Field Museum of Natural History in Chicago, Illinois for US$7.6 million – the highest price ever paid for a fossil at the time.

In 2012, President Peter Larson fired his brother, Neal, from the Black Hills Institute amid personal differences. Neal, owning a 35% share of the company, filed a lawsuit against Larson and others in 2015 alleging that he was being oppressed as a shareholder. He sought to liquidate the company to buy out his 35% share ownership and part ways. The court ruled that Neal’s shareholder rights had been violated when he was not invited nor allowed to speak at the meeting where he was fired. The Black Hills Institute did not have enough cash for a buyout, causing Larson's fossil collection to be appraised. Several years later, the court ruled that Neal would receive the Tyrannosaurus rex skeleton "Stan", which was appraised at a value of $6 million at the time. "Stan" was sold for $32 million in 2020.

== See also ==
- Peter Larson
