= Stan (dinosaur) =

Tyrannosaurus rex specimen

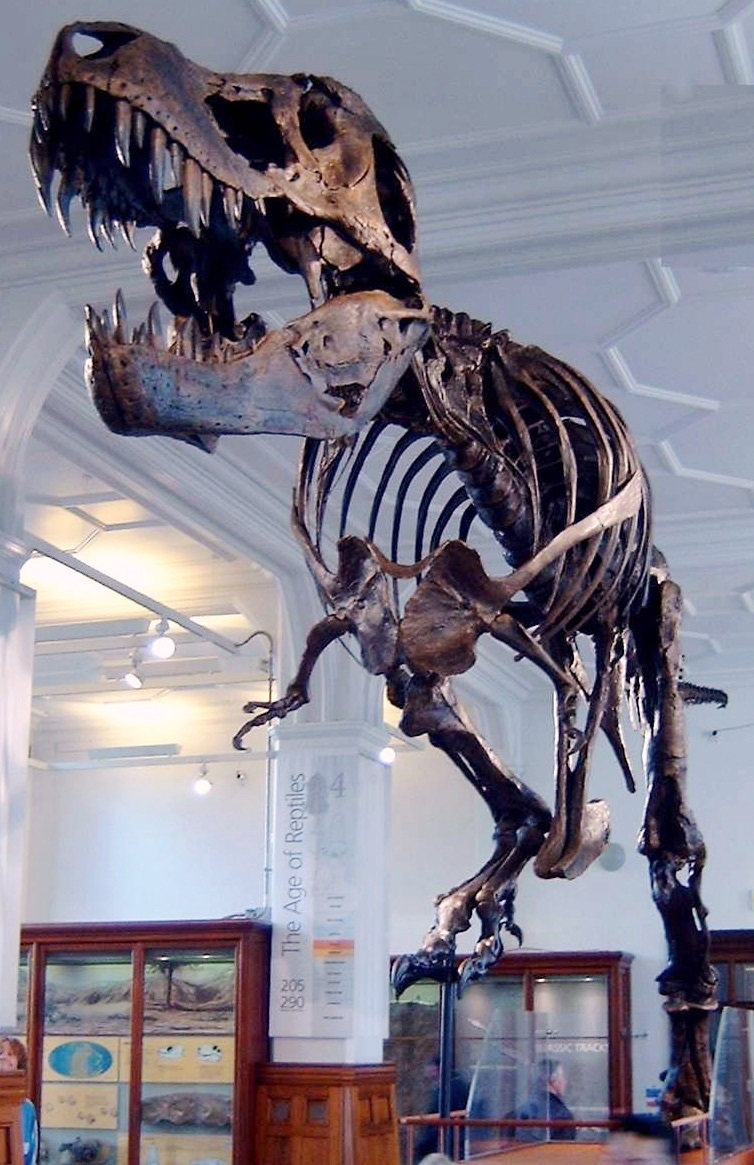
- A cast of Stan at the Manchester Museum
- Catalog no.: NHMAD 2020.00001
- Common name: Stan
- Species: Tyrannosaurus rex
- Age: 66.043 million years
- Place discovered: South Dakota, United States
- Date discovered: 1987
- Discovered by: Stan Sacrison

"Stan" (NHMAD 2020.00001, formerly BHI 3033) is a Tyrannosaurus rex fossil found in the Hell Creek Formation in South Dakota, just outside of Buffalo in 1987, and excavated in 1992. It is the fifth most complete T. rex fossil discovered to date, at more than 70% bulk. In October 2020, the fossil was sold for $31.8 million at auction, making it at the time the most expensive dinosaur specimen and fossil ever sold. This record stood until July 2024, when the Stegosaurus fossil Apex sold at auction for $44.6 million. The Abu Dhabi Department of Culture and Tourism acquired Stan and displayed the fossil at the Natural History Museum Abu Dhabi which opened on November 22, 2025.

== Discovery ==
Stan Sacrison, an amateur paleontologist, was responsible for the initial discovery of Stan's bone fragments in 1987, and as a result is the namesake for the T. rex. He was out looking at plant life in South Dakota when he spotted Stan's pelvis visible in the side of a cliff. At the time, Sacrison was doing freelance work for the Black Hills Institute of Geological Research. Originally, it was thought that the fossil was that of a Triceratops.

The excavation itself required the skills and resources of the Black Hills Institute; it officially began on 11 July 1992, led by Peter Larson (the lead paleontologist on the excavations of many other T. rex specimens like Sue and Trix as well as the institute's president). The institute's team removed the rock above Stan's skeleton with a Bobcat and finer removal was done manually with picks and brushes until the fossils could be plotted and diagrammed with the help of a grid placed over the dig site. The bones were then wrapped in burlap and plaster and brought to the Black Hills Institute.

== Description ==
"Sue", AMNH 5027, "Stan", and "Jane", to scale with a human

The most notable aspect of Stan is his nearly complete and perfectly preserved skull. It is widely regarded as the best T. rex skull ever discovered. Although the bones were separated from each other before excavation, they were in pristine condition and ideal for study by researchers. According to Pete Larson of the Black Hills Institute, Stan's skull has enabled scientists to learn more about the T. rex's cranial kinesis, or movement of the skull bones, than any other T. rex specimen. Because of Stan's narrow pelvis, some paleontologists interpret the specimen as being male, though this method of determining sex in T. rex is controversial. Stan is around 11.78 m (38.6 ft) in length as measured by the Hutchinson et al. 2011, Stan, measured another way, was 12 m (39 ft) long, 3.7 m (12 ft) high at the hips, and is estimated to be around 66 million years old. Body mass estimates for this specimen include 7.6 tonnes from Bates et al. in 2009, 5.9 to 10.8 tonnes in Hutchinson et al. 2011, and 7.2 tonnes in Sellers et al. 2017.

== Preparation ==
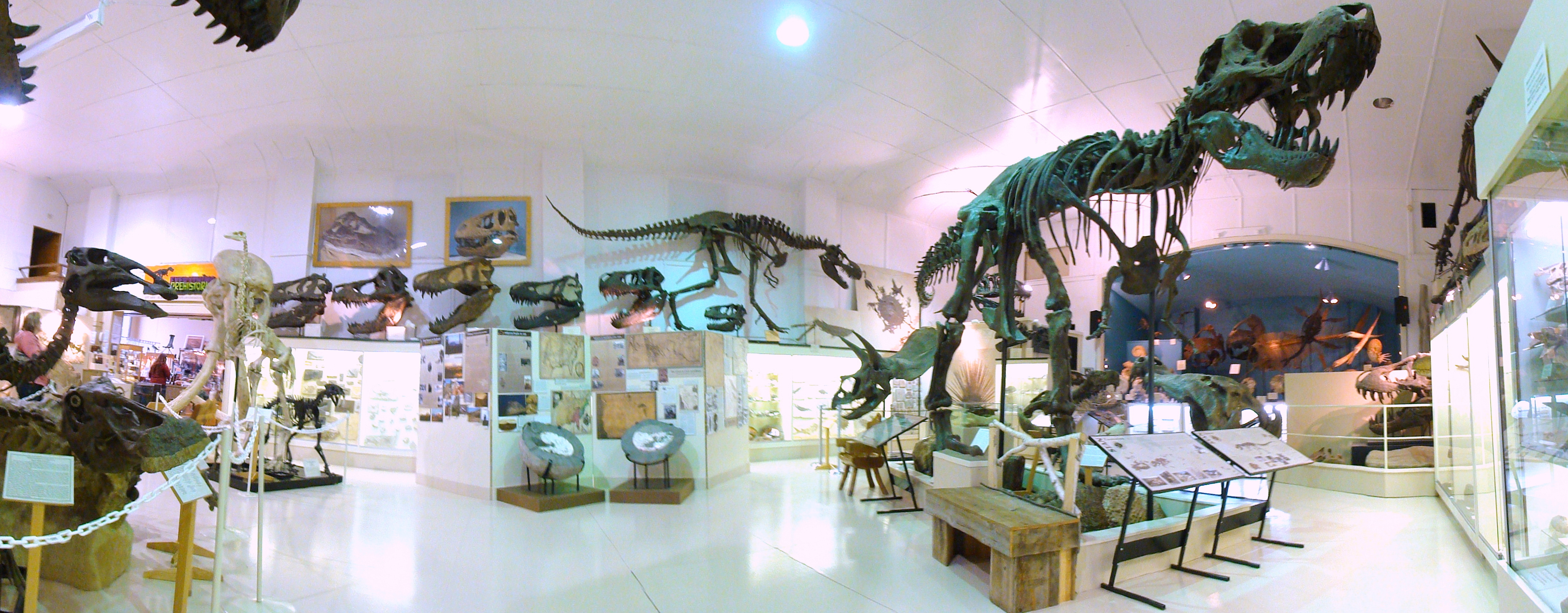
Photo of the original Stan Fossil (on the right) was taken at Black Hills Institute of Geological Research, Inc. from Hill City, South Dakota.

The bones of Stan the T. rex were cleaned and prepared at the Black Hills Institute where resident paleontologists and paleobotanists continued to study him and the fossilized plants he was discovered with. The institute has performed two additional excavations of the site that Stan was discovered, yielding 199 of the 350 known bones of the T. rex, more than 70% in bulk, which made Stan the second most complete T. rex until 2017.

Since then, additional excavations for other known T. rex specimens, as well as new discoveries regarding the T. rex "Scotty" (RSM P2523.8) in 2019, have made Stan the fifth most complete T. rex. However, "Stan" is still one of the most famous T. rex discoveries, and more than 60 casts of the skeleton are on display and requested by museums all around the world.

== Life and death ==
Stan's fossils show notable signs of wear and indication that the dinosaur experienced multiple attacks and illnesses throughout his life. Puncture wounds on the back of his skull and rib indicate that he was at one point bitten by another T. rex. Other bite marks at the base of his skull suggest his neck was once broken and caused the fusion of two vertebrae, resulting in a loss of mobility and pain for the rest of his life. The injury spurred the growth of excess bone around his neck, showing a remarkable recovery. Other irregularities in Stan's skull include non-symmetrical holes on either side of his jaw with smoothed edges, which are indications that these are more healed wounds.

According to the Black Hills Institute, Stan likely lived in a family unit of other T. rex. His mate could have been the cause of some of his injuries. Stan likely ate hadrosaurids, also known as duck-billed dinosaurs, such as Edmontosaurus. It is unknown what exactly caused Stan's death, but many theories suggest that it could have been the result of old age, starvation due to limited mobility from his injuries, or even parasitic infections that many T. rex exhibit signs of.

In 2005, the BBC program The Truth About Killer Dinosaurs used Stan's skull as a model for their hydraulic test of the T. rex's bite force and estimated that it exceeded 6.8 tonnes. Additional tests, like those published by Karl T. Bates and colleagues in 2009, used Stan's remains to study the weight distribution of T.rex, as well as how their mass and proportions would have affected their movement. Bates et al. estimated that Stan was larger than previously believed, at around 16,875 pounds (7.6 tonnes); they also concluded that Stan, as well as other Tyrannosaurus rex specimens, were much more robust than commonly believed.

== Exhibition ==
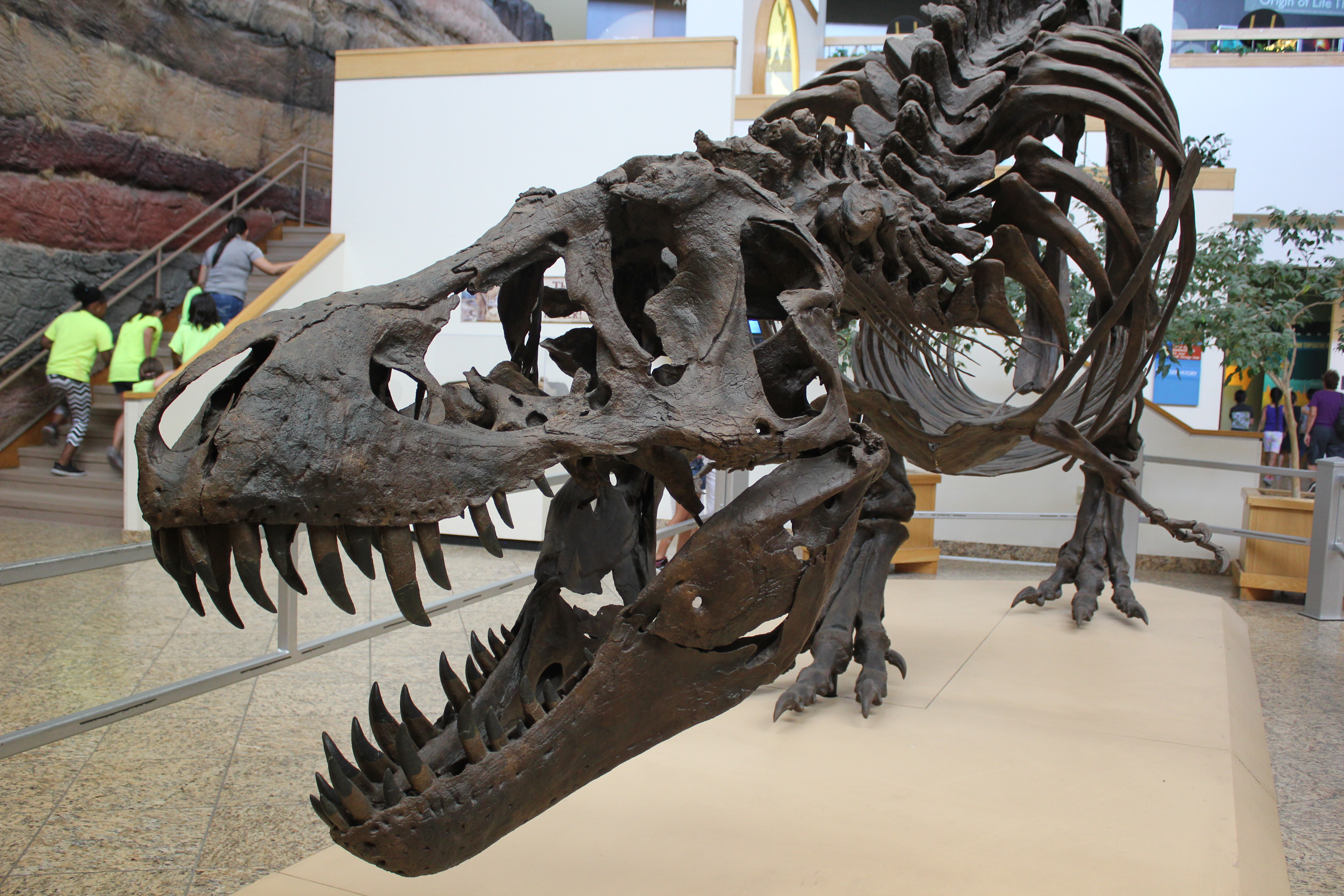
A cast of Stan at the New Mexico Museum of Natural History.

It took more than 30,000 hours (3.4 years) for the Black Hills Institute to prepare the fossil for display; he was the centerpiece for the opening of the T. rex World Exhibition and toured around Japan before coming to reside in the Black Hills Institute's Hall of Dinosaurs. Stan is the most duplicated T. rex fossil, and as a result, more people have seen Stan (and casts of Stan) than any other Tyrannosaurus.

The New Mexico Museum of Natural History is home to a cast of "Stan". The museum purchased the cast in 2008, and it remains a center piece of the museum, which is home to numerous other dinosaur fossils, notable T. rex skulls, and skull fragments. Another cast resided at Disney's Animal Kingdom theme park in the Walt Disney World Resort in Orlando, Florida, which is also home to a cast of Sue.

Other casts are displayed at the Houston Museum of Natural Science, the National Museum of Natural History (Washington, D.C.), the National Museum of Natural Science (Tokyo), The Mind Museum in Taguig, Metro Manila, Philippines, the Sternberg Museum of Natural History (Fort Hays, Kansas), the Museum of Natural Sciences (Brussels, Belgium), the Wyoming Dinosaur Center (Thermopolis, Wyoming), the Manchester Museum (Manchester, UK), the Museo Civico di Storia Naturale di Milano (Milan, Italy), the Children's Museum of Indianapolis (Indiana), the Dinosaur Discovery Museum (Kenosha, Wisconsin), the Weis Earth Science Museum (Menasha, WI), The Museum of Ancient Life at Thanksgiving Point (Lehi, Utah), Dinosaur World, (Plant City, Florida), the Discovery Park of America (Union City, TN), the Cerritos Library (Cerritos, CA) and the Natural History Museum at the University of Oslo. (While it has been reported that the Googleplex T. rex replica in Mountain View, California, United States is a replica of BHI-3033, it is actually a cast of MOR-555.)

The auction house Christie's sold Stan in New York, as part of its 20th Century Evening Sale, on October 6, 2020. Stan sold for $31.8 million to an anonymous buyer making it the most expensive fossil ever sold at the time. During a Manningcast broadcast of a National Football League playoff game on January 17, 2022, Dwayne "The Rock" Johnson was interviewed by Peyton and Eli Manning while at his home. Eli noted a T. rex skull in the background of Johnson's camera view; Johnson explained that the T. rex was named Stan, how it received its name, and how it was discovered. This led some to believe that Johnson was the anonymous buyer of Stan. However, Johnson and the Black Hills Institute confirmed that he owns a replica skull and not the real specimen. On March 23, 2022, it was announced that Stan is to be the centerpiece of the under construction Natural History Museum Abu Dhabi. The museum opened in November 22, 2025. "Stan" has been given a new accession number, NHMAD 2020.00001.

== Intellectual property ==
Stan's skeleton is the intellectual property of the Black Hills Institute, though the original bones have since been auctioned off. The institute retains the molds and sells polyurethane casts of the skeleton for $120,000; roughly one hundred casts have been sold, including one to the Smithsonian's National Museum of Natural History.

The Black Hills Institute loaned parts of Stan and Sue to Montana-based company Fort Peck Paleontology to assist in the reconstruction of a partial T. rex skeleton discovered in 1997. The institute later discovered that Fort Peck had sold at least five molds of its skeleton (nicknamed Peck's rex) to museums, which included unauthorized copies of Stan and Sue's bones. The Black Hills Institute filed a $7.4 million copyright infringement lawsuit in 2010, with Fort Peck arguing that "castings of dinosaur fossils constitute exact replicas of objects found in nature" and thus could not be copyrighted. The two parties agreed to an undisclosed settlement in 2012.

In 2022, a T. rex skeleton that had been set to be auctioned by Christie's in Hong Kong was withdrawn after the Black Hills Institute reported similarities with Stan's skull and jaw to the auction house. The dinosaur, nicknamed "Shen", had 79 original bones out of a total of 300 to 380 bones in a complete T. rex skeleton; roughly three-quarters of the skeleton was composed of casts of Stan. It had originally been expected to sell for $15–$25 million.

== See also ==
- Specimens of Tyrannosaurus
- Timeline of tyrannosaur research
- List of dinosaur specimens sold at auction
