= ASR =

ASR may refer to:

== Military ==
- A US Navy hull classification symbol: Submarine rescue vessel (ASR)
- U.S. Army Service Ribbon

== Organizations and publications ==
- ASR Nederland, a Dutch insurance company
- Academy at Swift River
- Erkilet International Airport, Turkey, IATA code
- Anderson Serangoon Junior College, pre-university institution in Singapore

== Science ==
- Ancestral sequence reconstruction, to infer ancient DNA sequences
- Acute stress reaction to traumatic event
- Adult sex ratio of males to females
- Alkali–silica reaction, affecting sensitive aggregates and causing concrete expansion and failure
- Analyte-specific reagent, a class of biological molecules
- Asian soybean rust, a plant disease
- Age-standardized rates of a phenomenon in a series of populations
- Audio sampling rate

== Technology ==
- Automatic speech recognition
- Automotive shredder residue, of shredded automobiles
- Aquifer storage and recovery, of potable water in an aquifer
- Airport surveillance radar
- Asr (radar), an Iranian radar system
- Arithmetic shift right, a computer instruction
- Answer-seizure ratio, the percentage of telephone calls that are answered
- Traction control system, from German: Antriebsschlupfregelung (Acceleration Slip Regulation), system to prevent loss of traction on vehicles
- Automatic Send Receive on a teletype
- Teletype ASR 33, a specific model teletype, commonly used for early day minicomputers
- Architecturally Significant Requirements

=== Software ===
- Apple Software Restore, a command line utility in Mac OS X
- Automated system recovery, a Microsoft Windows XP function
- Attack surface reduction, a fundamental principle of security

== Transport ==
- Air-sea rescue
- State Railway of Thailand ASR class
- Australian Southern Railroad, a former rail freight operator

== Other uses ==
- Asr, the daily afternoon prayer in Islam
- Al-Asr, 103rd chapter of the Quran
- Accelerated share repurchase, whereby companies buy back shares
- ASMR (autonomous sensory meridian response), a tingling sensation
