= Analyte-specific reagent =

Class of biological molecules

Analyte-specific reagents (ASRs) are a class of biological molecules which can be used to identify and measure the amount of an individual chemical substance in biological specimens.

== Regulatory definition ==
The U.S. Food and Drug Administration (FDA) defines analyte specific reagents (ASRs) in 21 CFR 864.4020 as “antibodies, both polyclonal and monoclonal, specific receptor proteins, ligands, nucleic acid sequences, and similar reagents which, through specific binding or chemical reaction with substances in a specimen, are intended to be used in a diagnostic application for identification and quantification of an individual chemical substance or ligand in biological specimens.”

In simple terms, an analyte specific reagent is the active ingredient of an in-house test.
