= Specimens of Tyrannosaurus =

"Sue", AMNH 5027, "Stan", and "Jane" (now considered Nanotyrannus), to scale with a human

Tyrannosaurus is one of the most iconic dinosaurs and is known from numerous specimens, some of which have individually acquired notability due to their scientific significance and media coverage.

== Specimen data ==
=== Publicly accessioned specimens ===
Over 60 specimens of Tyrannosaurus are accessioned into public museums, which are represented by the table below largely based on the following sources: (Note: The table below only includes specimens of which the formation and year collected are confirmed or can be approximated, and there are more specimens accessioned in museums whose discoverer, place of discovery and date of collection are unknown. Specimen completeness listed in this table are mostly based on bone count by Larson and Carpenter (2008). Some of the specimens listed on Table 1 and 3 by Carr (CMNH 7541, BMRP 2002.4.1, KUVP 156375 and the 'Dueler') based on the proposed synonymy has since been firmly established as specimens of a distinct genus Nanotyrannus by Zanno and Napoli (2025); the identity of Stygivenator (LACM 28471) also listed on Table 1 remains dubious.)

Specimen number	Name	Completeness	Year collected	Museum	Museum city	Discoverer	Formation	Location	Notes
YPM 4192		<1%	1874	Yale Peabody Museum	New Haven	Arthur Lakes	Hell Creek Formation	South Table Mountain, Colorado	First T. rex fossil to be found, consists of a single tooth.
AMNH FARB 3982	Manospondylus gigas	< 1%	1892	American Museum of Natural History	New York City	Edward Cope	Hell Creek Formation	Faith, South Dakota	Described as Manospondylus gigas
NHMUK R7994	Dynamosaurus imperiosus	13%	1900	Natural History Museum, London	London	Barnum Brown	Lance Formation	Seven Mile Creek, Wyoming	Originally AMNH 5866; Described as Dynamosaurus imperiosus, analysis of the specimen suggests a large individual similar to Sue
CM 9380	Holotype	11%	1902	Carnegie Museum of Natural History	Pittsburgh	Barnum Brown; Richard Lull	Hell Creek Formation	Montana	Originally AMNH 973
CM 1400		10%	1902	Carnegie Museum of Natural History	Pittsburgh	Olaf Peterson	Lance Formation	Wyoming	
CM 9401		10%	1903	Carnegie Museum of Natural History	Pittsburgh	John Bell Hatcher	Judith River Formation	Montana	Potentially the earliest known specimen of Tyrannosaurus
AMNH FARB 5027		48%	1908	American Museum of Natural History	New York City	Barnum Brown	Hell Creek Formation	Montana	The base skeleton that was used as the iconic symbol for the famous logo of the Jurassic Park film series.
AMNH FARB 5029			1908	American Museum of Natural History	New York City	Barnum Brown	Hell Creek Formation	Montana	
AMNH FARB 5117			1908	American Museum of Natural History	New York City	Charles Hazelius Sternberg	Lance Formation	Wyoming	
AMNH FARB 5050			1909	American Museum of Natural History	New York City		Hell Creek Formation	Montana	Juvenile T. rex represented by incomplete dentary
MOR 002			1965	Museum of the Rockies	Bozeman		Hell Creek Formation	Montana	
LACM 23844		25%	1966	Natural History Museum of Los Angeles County	Los Angeles	Harley Garbani	Hell Creek Formation	Montana	
LACM 23845	Dinotyrannus megagracilis	12%	1967	Natural History Museum of Los Angeles County	Los Angeles	Harley Garbani	Hell Creek Formation	Montana	Juvenile T. rex
MOR 008		15%	1967	Museum of the Rockies	Bozeman	William MacMannis	Hell Creek Formation	Montana	Also known as The Nation's Rex. Specimen on loan to the Smithsonian Institution, with a cast on display at the Museum of the Rockies and the Schiele Museum of Natural History.
TMM 41436-1	Tyrannosaurus "vannus"		1970	Texas Memorial Museum	Austin		Javelina Formation	Texas	One of the potential southernmost record of Tyrannosaurus
UCMP 118742			1977	University of California Museum of Paleontology	Berkeley		Hell Creek Formation	Montana	
MMS 51-2004			? (before 1978)	Science Museum of Minnesota	Saint Paul		Hell Creek Formation	South Dakota	
SDSM 12047	"Mud Butte T. rex"		1981	South Dakota School of Mines and Technology	Rapid City		Hell Creek Formation	South Dakota	
TMP 1981.012.0001	"Huxley T. rex"	16%	1981	Royal Tyrrell Museum of Palaeontology	Drumheller	Charles Mortram Sternberg	Scollard Formation	Huxley	
TMP 1981.006.0001	"Black Beauty"	28%	1981	Royal Tyrrell Museum of Palaeontology	Drumheller	Jeff Baker	Willow Creek Formation	Crowsnest Pass	One of the westernmost specimens, found at $114^\circ$ W longitude. Noted for black colouration taken on during fossilisation.
MOR 009	"Hager rex"	19%	1981	Museum of the Rockies	Bozeman	Mick Hager	Hell Creek Formation	Montana	
NMMNH P-3698	Tyrannosaurus mcraeensis	3%	1983	New Mexico Museum of Natural History and Science	Albuquerque	Donald Staton Joe LaPoint	Hall Lake Formation	New Mexico	The holotype of T. mcraeensis, dating to around 5–7 million years before T. rex
UCMP 131583			1984	University of California Museum of Paleontology	Berkeley		Hell Creek Formation	Montana	
UCMP 140418			1984	University of California Museum of Paleontology	Berkeley		Hell Creek Formation	Montana	
BDM 050	"Bertha"		1987	Badlands Dinosaur Museum	Dickinson, North Dakota	Larry League	Hell Creek Formation	North Dakota	Associated femur, tibia, fibula. One of the largest known specimens.
MOR 555	"Wankel rex", "Devil rex"	49% (by bone count)	1990	Museum of the Rockies	Bozeman	Kathy Wankel	Hell Creek Formation	Montana	Also known as The Nation's Rex. Specimen on loan to the Smithsonian Institution, with a cast on display at the Museum of the Rockies and the Schiele Museum of Natural History.
FMNH PR2081	"Sue"	73% (by bone count)	1990	Field Museum of Natural History	Chicago	Sue Hendrickson	Hell Creek Formation	South Dakota	The largest known specimen at the time of discovery as well as one of the most complete.
FMNH PR2411			1990	Field Museum of Natural History	Chicago		Hell Creek Formation	South Dakota	
RSM 2347.1			1991	Royal Saskatchewan Museum	Eastend		Frenchman Formation	Saskatchewan	
DMNH 2827		4%	1992	Denver Museum of Nature and Science	Denver		Denver Formation	Colorado	
NHMAD 2020.00001	"Stan"	63%	1992	Natural History Museum Abu Dhabi	Abu Dhabi	Stan Sacrison	Hell Creek Formation	South Dakota	One of the best-known specimens, with casts present in numerous institutions. Currently displayed at the Natural History Museum Abu Dhabi which opened in November 22, 2025; whether the specimen is loaned and the ownership of the specimen belongs to a private collector remains uncertain.
UWGM 181		7%	1993	UW–Madison Geology Museum	Madison, Wisconsin	Mike Pallett	Hell Creek Formation	Montana	
UCMP 140506			1993	University of California Museum of Paleontology	Berkeley		Hell Creek Formation	Montana	
RSM 2523.8	"Scotty"	65%	1994	Royal Saskatchewan Museum	Eastend	Robert Gebhardt	Frenchman Formation	Saskatchewan	Proposed to be largest known specimen, scientific consensus not yet reached. Exceeds "Sue" in 84.6% of the published bone measurements. Has been estimated to be larger than "Sue" in two published studies.
LPD 977-2	"Pete"	10-15%	1995	Denver Museum of Nature and Science	Denver	Rob Patchus	Denver Formation	Colorado	
MOR 980	"Montana's T. rex", "Peck's rex", "Peckrex", "Rigby's rex"	40%	1997	Museum of the Rockies	Bozeman	Lou Tremblay	Hell Creek Formation	Montana	
MOR 1126	"C-rex", "Celeste"	9%	2000	Museum of the Rockies	Bozeman	Celeste Horner	Hell Creek Formation	Montana	One of the largest specimens, although size estimation is difficult due to its fragmentary nature.
MOR 1131	"J-rex"		2000	Museum of the Rockies	Bozeman		Hell Creek Formation	Montana	
MOR 1128	"G-rex", "Greg"	8%	2001	Museum of the Rockies	Bozeman	Greg Wilson	Hell Creek Formation	Montana	
MOR 1125	"B-rex", "Bob"	37%	2001	Museum of the Rockies	Bozeman	Bob Harmon	Hell Creek Formation	Montana	Confirmed as female, due to the presence of medullary bone.
MOR 1152	"F-rex", "Frank"	8%?	2001	Museum of the Rockies	Bozeman	Frank Stewart	Hell Creek Formation	Montana	
UMNH 11000		9% (by bone count)	2001	Utah Museum of Natural History	Salt Lake City	Quintin Saharatian Rose L. Difley	North Horn Formation	Utah	The first reported occurrence of T. rex in Utah
UCRC PV1	"Rex Jr."	20%	2001	University of Chicago Research Collection	Chicago		Lance Formation	Wyoming	
TCM 2001.90.1	"Bucky"	34%	2001	The Children's Museum of Indianapolis	Indianapolis	Bucky Derflinger	Hell Creek Formation	South Dakota	Specimen is nearly adult-sized, probably at least 16 years old.
BMRP 2001.4.70			2001	Burpee Museum of Natural History	Rockford		Hell Creek Formation	Montana	Juvenile T. rex represented by incomplete postcranium
USNM 720145			2002	Smithsonian Institution	Washington, D.C.		Hell Creek Formation	Montana	
MOR 1189			2002	Museum of the Rockies	Bozeman	Mick Hager	Hell Creek Formation	Montana	Juvenile T. rex represented by hindlimb
HMNS 2006.1743.01	"Wyrex"	38%	2002	Houston Museum of Natural Science	Houston	Dan Wells Don Wyrick	Hell Creek Formation	Montana	
LACM 150167	"Thomas"	37% (by bone count)	2003	Natural History Museum of Los Angeles County	Los Angeles	Luis M. Chiappe	Hell Creek Formation	Montana	
BMRP 2006.6.4			2006	Burpee Museum of Natural History	Rockford		Hell Creek Formation	Montana	
DDM 35.1			2006	Dinosaur Discovery Museum	Kenosha		Hell Creek Formation	Montana	Juvenile T. rex represented by incomplete tibia
MOR 2822			2006	Museum of the Rockies	Bozeman		Hell Creek Formation	Montana	
MOR 2925			2007	Museum of the Rockies	Bozeman		Hell Creek Formation	Montana	
RSM 2990.1			2007	Royal Saskatchewan Museum	Eastend		Frenchman Formation	Saskatchewan	
MOR 3028			2010	Museum of the Rockies	Bozeman		Hell Creek Formation	Montana	
MOR 3044			2010	Museum of the Rockies	Bozeman		Hell Creek Formation	Montana	
MOR 6625			2010	Museum of the Rockies	Bozeman	Lee Hall	Hell Creek Formation	Montana	
TATE 2222			2011	Tate Geological Museum at Casper College	Casper		Lance Formation	Wyoming	
MOR 9738			2012	Museum of the Rockies	Bozeman	Denver Fowler	Hell Creek Formation	Montana	
DDM 344.1			2012	Dinosaur Discovery Museum	Kenosha		Hell Creek Formation	Montana	Juvenile T. rex represented by frontal bone
RGM 792.000	"Trix"		2013	Naturalis Biodiversity Center	Leiden	Naturalis Biodiversity Center/Black Hills Institute	Hell Creek Formation	Montana	One of the largest known specimens that is also well preserved. Has been stated to be the oldest known specimen but this has not been confirmed.
UWBM 99000	"Tufts-Love"		2015	Burke Museum of Natural History and Culture	Seattle	Jason Love Luke Tufts	Hell Creek Formation	Montana	
KUVP 155809			2015	University of Kansas Natural History Museum	Lawrence		Hell Creek Formation	Montana	
DDM 1536.8			2018	Dinosaur Discovery Museum	Kenosha		Hell Creek Formation	Montana	Juvenile T. rex represented by frontal bone
DDM 1562.14			2018	Dinosaur Discovery Museum	Kenosha		Hell Creek Formation	Montana	Juvenile T. rex represented by first maxillary tooth
DDM 1863.11			2019	Dinosaur Discovery Museum	Kenosha		Hell Creek Formation	Montana	Juvenile T. rex represented by first maxillary tooth
DDM 2355			2022	Dinosaur Discovery Museum	Kenosha		Hell Creek Formation	Montana	Juvenile T. rex represented by partial skull and skeleton

=== Privately owned specimens ===
The table below includes specimens that are in private collections and institutions including the Black Hills Institute, or loaned in a public museum but is owned by a private collector.

Name	Completeness	Year collected	Museum	Museum city	Discoverer	Formation	Location	Notes
"Samson", "Z-rex", "Mr. Z", "Mr. Zed"	40%	1992			Mike Zimmershied	Hell Creek Formation	South Dakota	
"Bowman"	< 15%	1993	Pioneer Trails Regional Museum	Bowman	Dean Pearson	Hell Creek Formation	North Dakota	Under the accession number PTRM 4667
"Duffy"	25%	1993	Black Hills Institute	Hill City	Stan Sacrison	Hell Creek Formation	South Dakota	Under the accession number BHI 4100
"Double-O-Seven", "007"	3%	1994	Black Hills Institute	Hill City	Bill Garstka	Hell Creek Formation	North Dakota	Under the accession number BHI 6219
"Steven"	3%	1995	Black Hills Institute	Hill City	Steve Sacrison	Hell Creek Formation	South Dakota	Under the accession number BHI 6249
"E. D. Cope"	10%	2000	Black Hills Institute	Hill City	Bucky Derfilinger	Hell Creek Formation	South Dakota	Under the accession number BHI 6248
"Barbara"		2005	Auckland War Memorial Museum	Auckland	Bob Harmon	Hell Creek Formation	Montana	Under the accession number AWMM-IL2022.21
"Baby Bob"		2013			Robert (Bob) Detrich	Hell Creek Formation	Montana	A juvenile or baby specimen. The discoverers have stated its age to be 4 years based on histology. An attempt was made to sell the specimen on eBay.
"Titus"		2014			Craig Pfister	Hell Creek Formation	Montana	The specimen belongs to a private collector, but 3D-printed replicas of the bones are accessioned in the Nottingham Natural History Museum collection under the accession number NCMG 2021-7
"Peter"		2018	Auckland War Memorial Museum	Auckland	Dick Wills	Lance Formation	Wyoming	Under the accession number AWMM-IL 2022.9
"Gus"	61% complete by bone count, 75 to 80% complete in terms of bone mass	2021-2023			Theropoda Expeditions	Hell Creek Formation	South Dakota	Sold at auction for $50.1m in 2026.

== Manospondylus: AMNH FARB 3982 ==
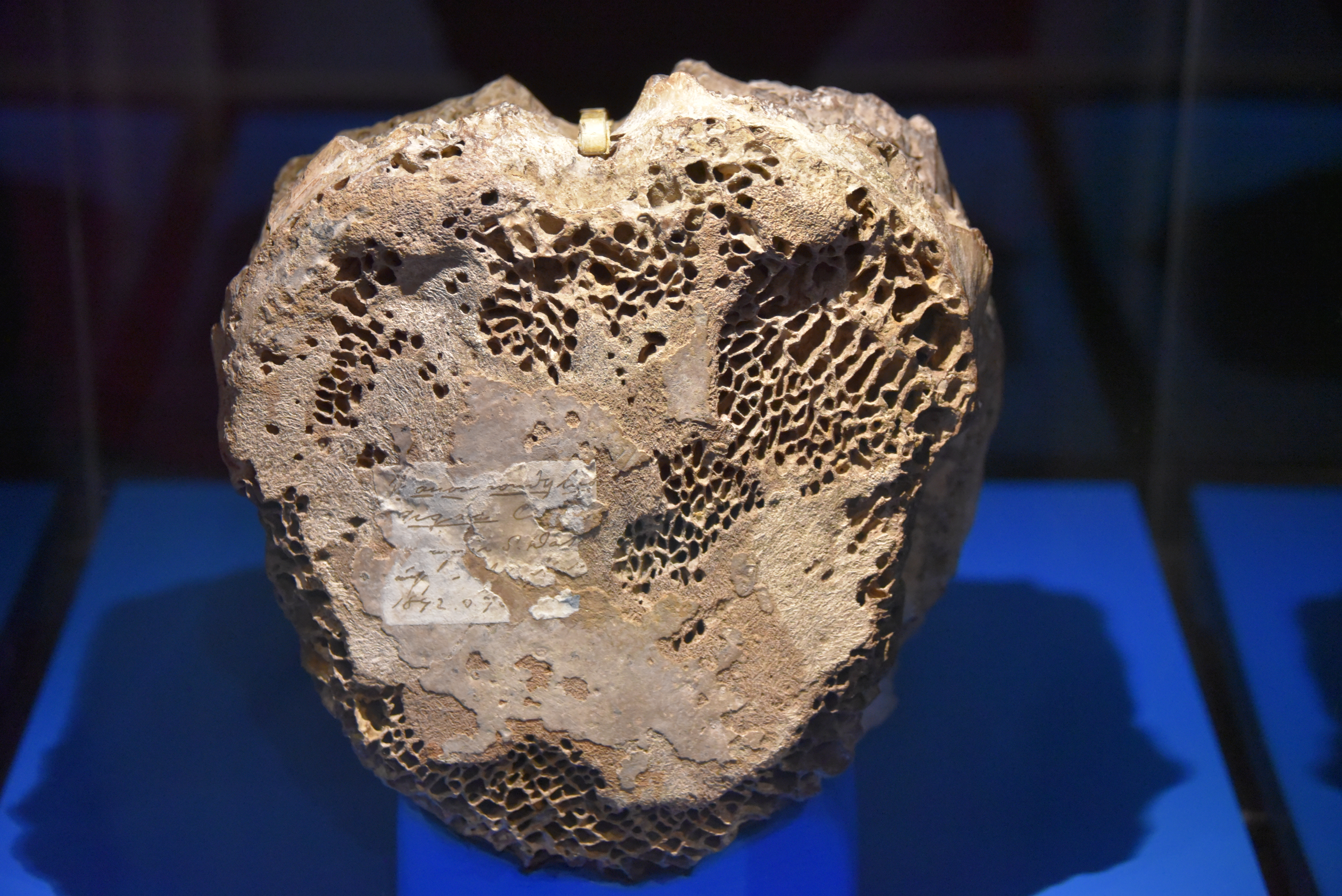
Type specimen (AMNH 3982) of Manospondylus gigas

The first-named fossil specimen which can be attributed to Tyrannosaurus rex consists of two partial vertebrae (one of which has been lost) found by Edward Drinker Cope in 1892. Cope believed that they belonged to an "agathaumid" (ceratopsid) dinosaur, and named them Manospondylus gigas, meaning "giant porous vertebra" in reference to the numerous openings for blood vessels he found in the bone. The M. gigas remains were later identified as those of a theropod rather than a ceratopsid, and H.F. Osborn recognized the similarity between M. gigas and Tyrannosaurus rex as early as 1917. However, due to the fragmentary nature of the Manospondylus vertebrae, Osborn did not synonymize the two genera.

== Dynamosaurus: NHMUK R7994 ==
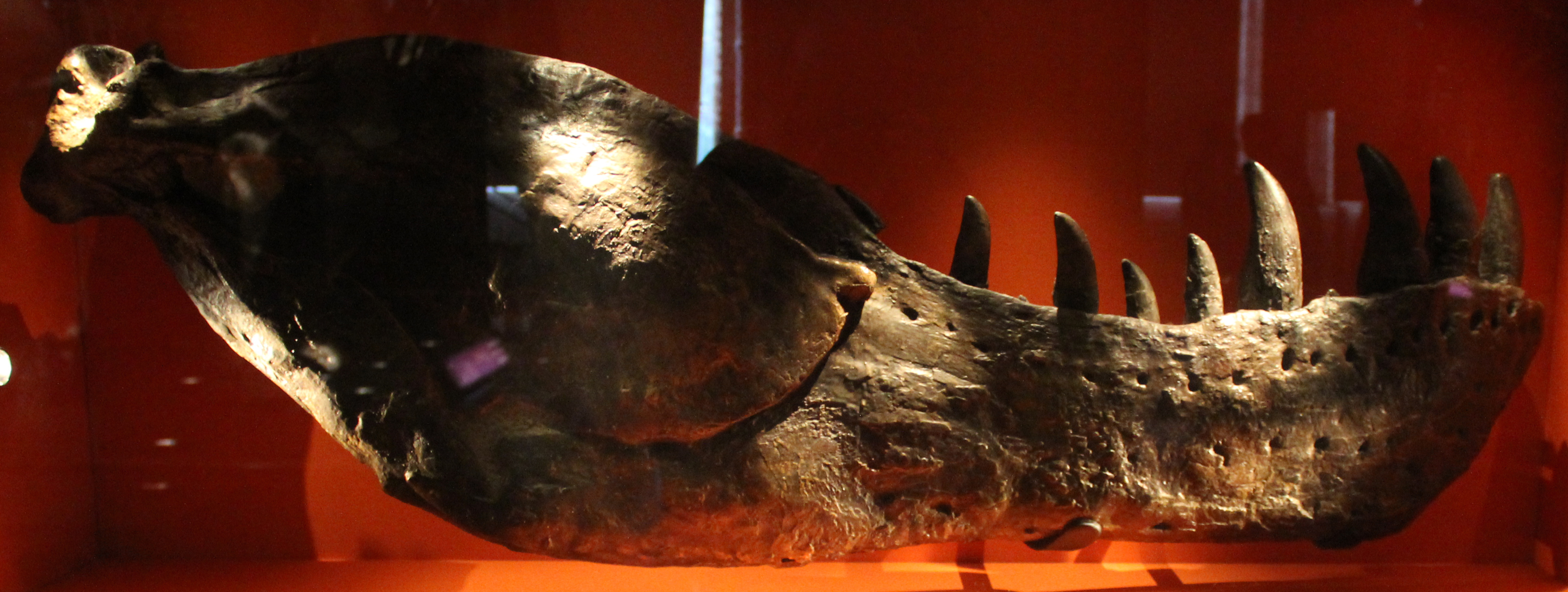
Type specimen of Dynamosaurus imperiosus, London

The holotype of Tyrannosaurus rex, a partial skull and skeleton originally called AMNH 973 (AMNH stands for American Museum of Natural History), was discovered in the U.S. state of Montana in 1902 and excavated over the next three years. Another specimen (AMNH 5866), found in Wyoming in 1900, was described in the same paper under the name Dynamosaurus imperiosus. At the time of their initial description and naming, these specimens had not been fully prepared and the type specimen of T. rex had not even been fully recovered. In 1906, after further preparation and examination, Henry Fairfield Osborn recognized both skeletons as belonging to the same species. Because the name Tyrannosaurus rex had appeared just one page earlier than Dynamosaurus in Osborn's 1905 work, it was considered the older name and has been used since. Had it not been for page order, Dynamosaurus would have become the official name.

== Holotype: CM 9380 ==
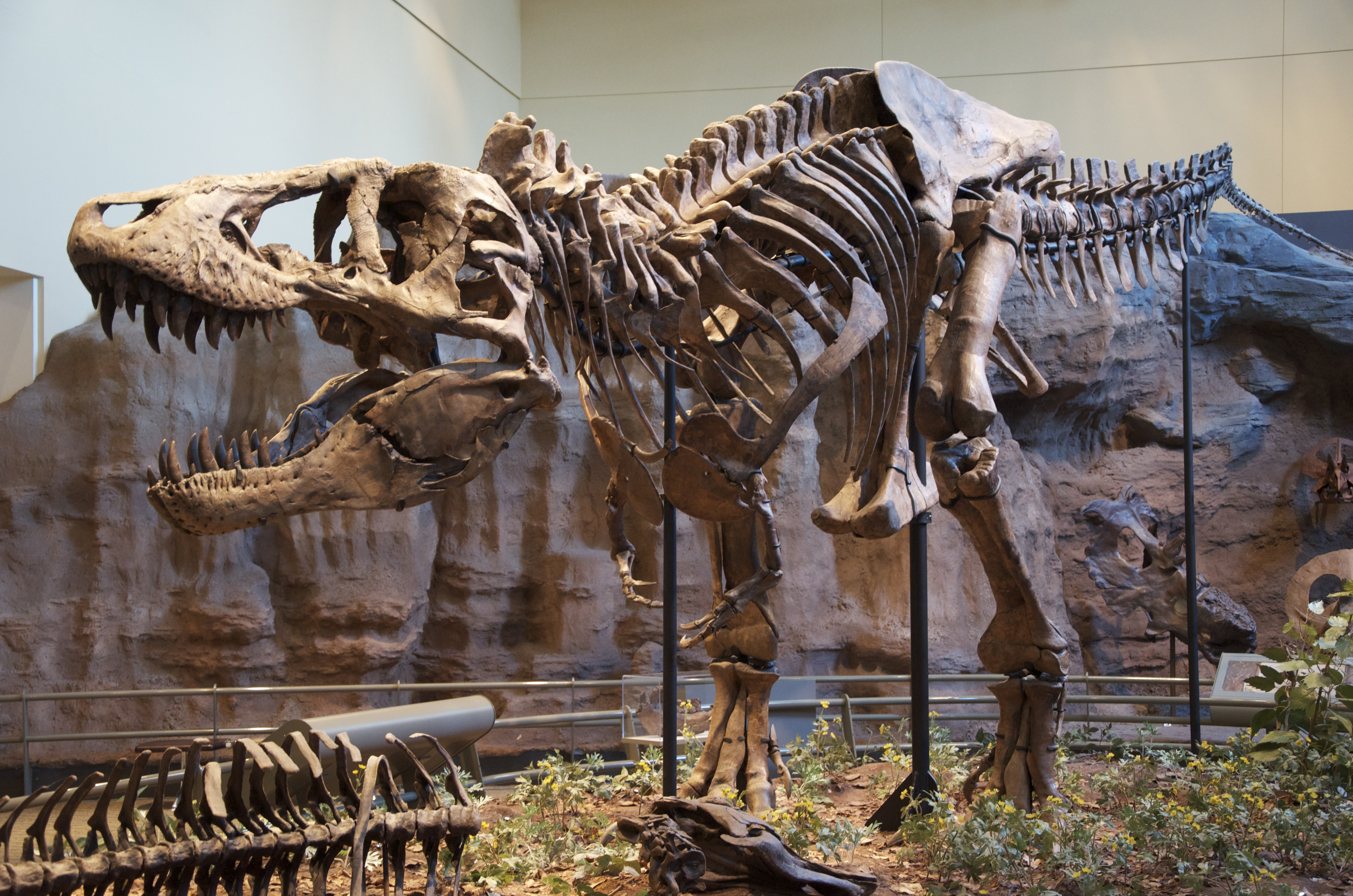
Reconstructed mount of T. rex holotype CM 9380

CM (deposited at the Carnegie Museum of Natural History) 9380 is the holotype (name-bearing) specimen of Tyrannosaurus rex. It was originally discovered in 1902 by an American Museum of Natural History expedition to outcrops of the Hell Creek Formation in Dawson County, Montana. This expedition was led by American paleontologist Barnum Brown and accompanied by American professor Richard Swan Lull and initially recovered fragments of the skull, both mandibles (lower jaws), the right scapula (shoulderblade), the left humerus (upper arm bone), four dorsal vertebrae (backbones), the pubis, an incomplete ischium, the bottom end of the left femur (thighbone), the left tibia (shinbone), and the right metatarsal of what would be named T. rex. The remains were found intermingled with those of the ceratopsid Triceratops, and a hadrosaurid. In 1905, the current knowledge of large theropods was limited to Jurassic genera like Allosaurus which had relatively large arms, so when the short humerus of the holotype was uncovered it was proposed that it came from a smaller theropod which became jumbled with the remains of T. rex. These fossils sent to the AMNH and deposited under specimen number AMNH 973. While much of the skeleton had yet to be prepared, American paleontologist Henry Fairfield Osborn described the specimen in 1905 as coming from a new genus and species of theropod dinosaur, Tyrannosaurus rex. Renewed excavations at the site in the summer of 1905 recovered many additional elements that were now prepared including more of the skull, two ribs, more of the femur, the sacrum, and the rest of the pelvis (hip bones), which Osborn published on in 1906. American artist L. M. Sterling made a composite skeletal reconstruction of T. rex using the holotype and an assigned specimen, AMNH 5866, for the paper.

Following the 1941 entry of the United States into World War II, the holotype was sold to the Carnegie Museum of Natural History in Pittsburgh for protection against possible bombing raids. The specimen, now labeled CM 9380, is still mounted in Pittsburgh, at first with the tail acting as a tripod in the old-fashioned kangaroo pose. It has since received a modernization of its posture (mounted by Phil Fraley and crew) and can now be found balancing with tail outstretched. Along with a more lifelike posture, the specimen also now includes a composite reconstruction of the skull by Michael Holland. It has been reconstructed in recent years, it measured an estimated 11.9 metres (39 ft) in length and an estimated weight of 7.4–14.6 metric tonnes, 9.1 metric tonnes being the average estimate in that study, although most earlier studies have suggested lower weight figures.

== AMNH 5027 ==
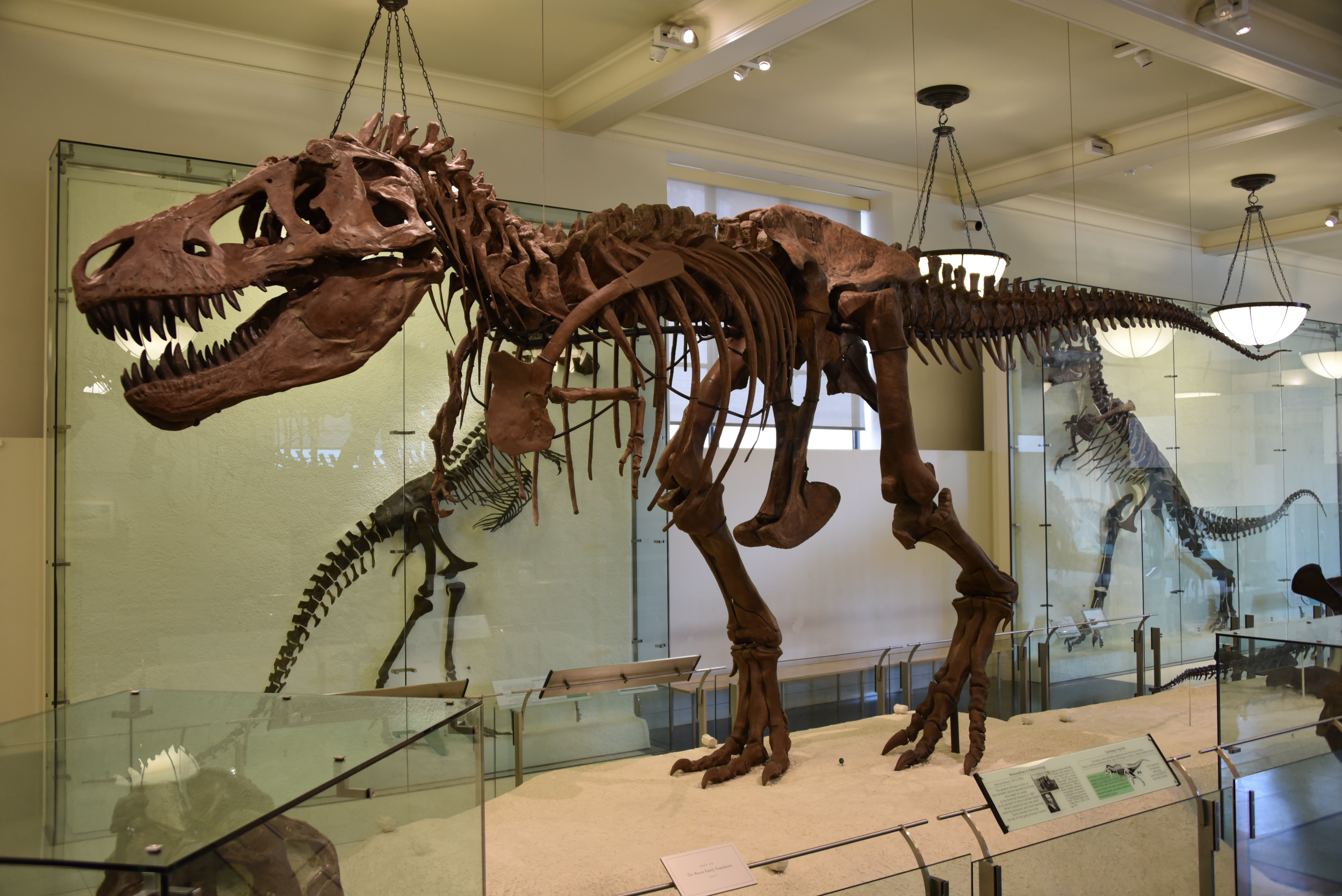
Tyrannosaurus specimen AMNH 5027 at the American Museum of Natural History

With a length of 12.1–12.2 metres (40–40 ft), AMNH 5027 was discovered and excavated in 1908 by Barnum Brown in Montana, and described by Osborn in 1912 and 1916. At the time of discovery, a complete cervical (neck vertebrae) series for Tyrannosaurus was not previously known, so it was this specimen that brought the short, stocky tyrannosaur neck to light. Compared to later specimens (BMNH R7994 and FMNH PR2081, for instance) the cervical series of AMNH 5027 is much more gracile, so with later discoveries the distinction between tyrannosaurid necks and the necks of carnosaurs became more obvious. This specimen also provided the first complete skull of Tyrannosaurus rex. In total, Brown found five partial Tyrannosaurus skeletons. The skeleton of this specimen was used as the iconic symbol for the Jurassic Park film series.

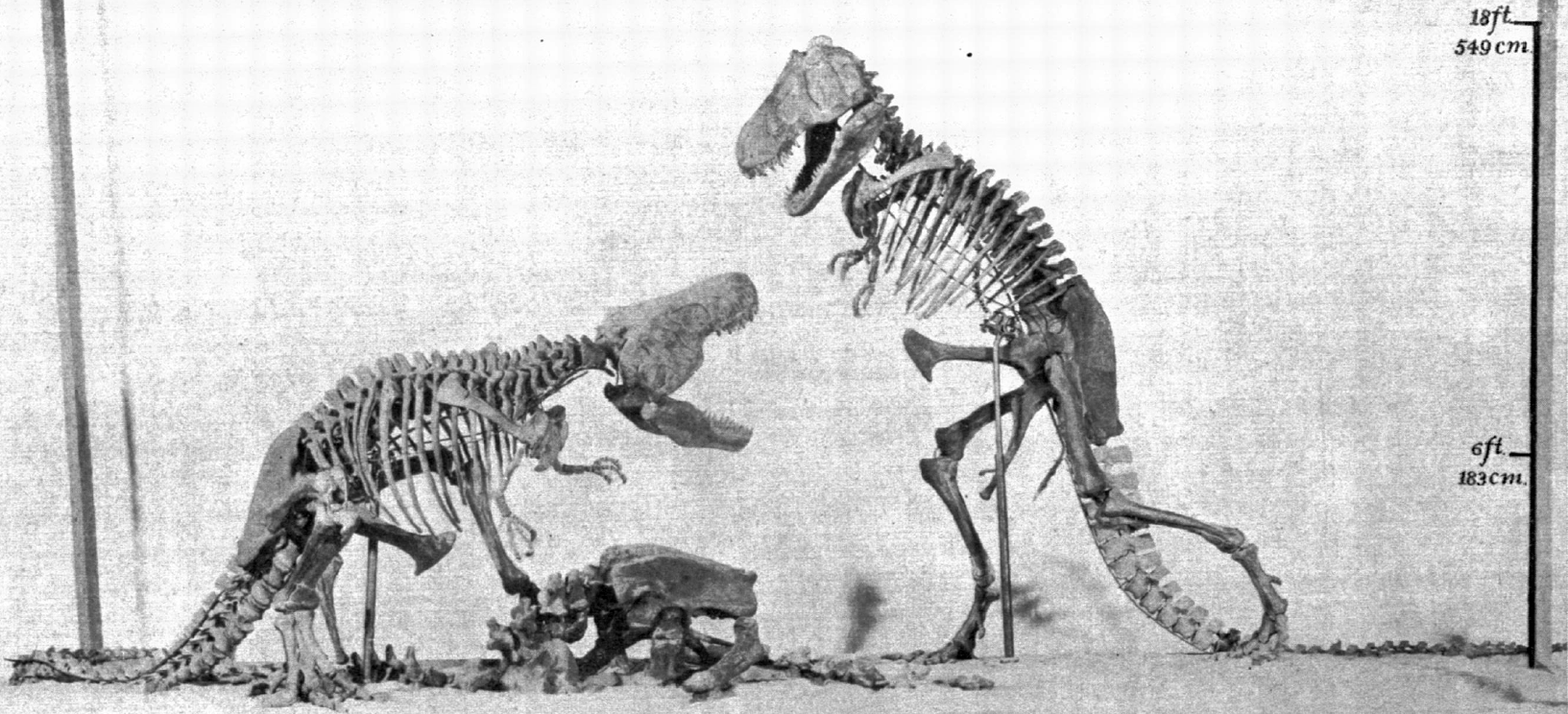
Scale model of the never-completed Tyrannosaurus rex exhibit Osborn planned for the American Museum of Natural History

Osborn planned to mount the similarly sized AMNH 5027 and AMNH 973 together in dynamic poses. Designed by E.S. Christman, the scene was to depict a rearing Tyrannosaurus (AMNH 5027) snapping at another cowering one (AMNH 973), as they fought over the remains of a hadrosaur, described at the time as Trachodon. However, technical difficulties prevented the mount from being executed. One obvious problem was that the Cretaceous Dinosaur Hall was too small to accommodate this dramatic display, and AMNH 5027 was already mounted by itself as the central attraction of the hall. The forearms of Tyrannosaurus were not well documented and the hands were unknown, so for the sake of the display, the forearms of AMNH 5027 were given three fingers, based on the forelimbs of Allosaurus (the more allosaur-like arms were replaced several years later when better fossils of tyrannosaurid arms were found).

The mount retained a rearing pose similar to the initial proposal. By the 1980s it was generally accepted that such a pose would have been anatomically impossible in life, and the skeleton was re-mounted in a more accurate, horizontal pose during a renovation of the museum's dinosaur halls in the early 1990s. The mount can still be seen on display on the fourth floor of the American Museum. The American Museum of Natural History features AMNH 5027 in its famed Hall of Saurischian Dinosaurs to this day.

== LACM 23844 ==
In 1966, a crew working for the Natural History Museum of Los Angeles County under the direction of Harley Garbani discovered another T. rex (LACM 23844) which included most of the skull of a very large, mature animal. When it was put on display in Los Angeles, LACM 23844 was the largest T. rex skull on exhibit anywhere.

== "Black Beauty": TMP 1981.006.0001 ==
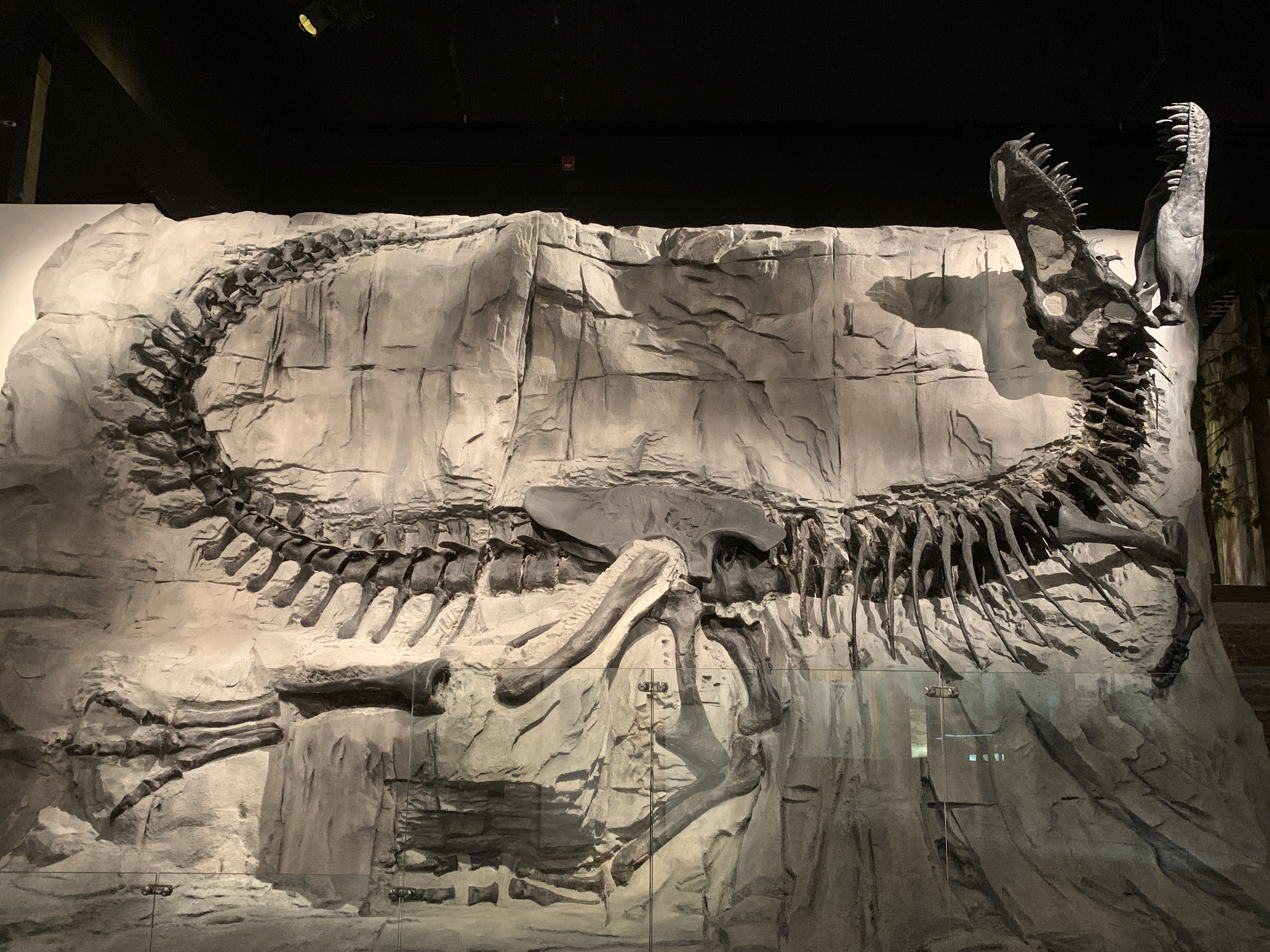
"Black Beauty"

"Black Beauty" (specimen number RTMP 81.6.1) is a well-preserved fossil of Tyrannosaurus rex. The nickname stems from the apparent shiny dark color of the fossil bones, which occurred during fossilization by the presence of minerals in the surrounding rock; it was the first Tyrannosaurus rex specimen to receive a nickname, beginning a trend that continues with most major T. rex finds. Black Beauty was found in 1980 by a high school student, Jeff Baker, while on a fishing trip with a friend in the region of the Crowsnest Pass, Alberta. A large bone was found in the riverbank and shown to their teacher. Soon afterward, the Royal Tyrrell Museum was contacted, and excavation of the sandstone matrix surrounding the fossils began in 1982. The dig site where the fossil was found is located at approximately 114° West near the confluence of the Crowsnest and Willow Rivers, and consisted of rock belonging to the Willow Creek Formation. The specimen is housed in the Royal Tyrrell Museum in Drumheller, Alberta, Canada.

In 2009, a paper by Jack Horner and colleagues illustrated the concept of parasitic infections in dinosaurs by analysing the lesions found on the cranial bones of Black Beauty. The specimen has been used to study comparative morphology between tyrannosaurids and Tyrannosaurus individuals.

Replicas of Black Beauty have been shown in some exhibitions and museums, including both simple skull montages and complete skeletons. Casts are on display in museums around the world.

== "Stan": NHMAD 2020.00001 ==
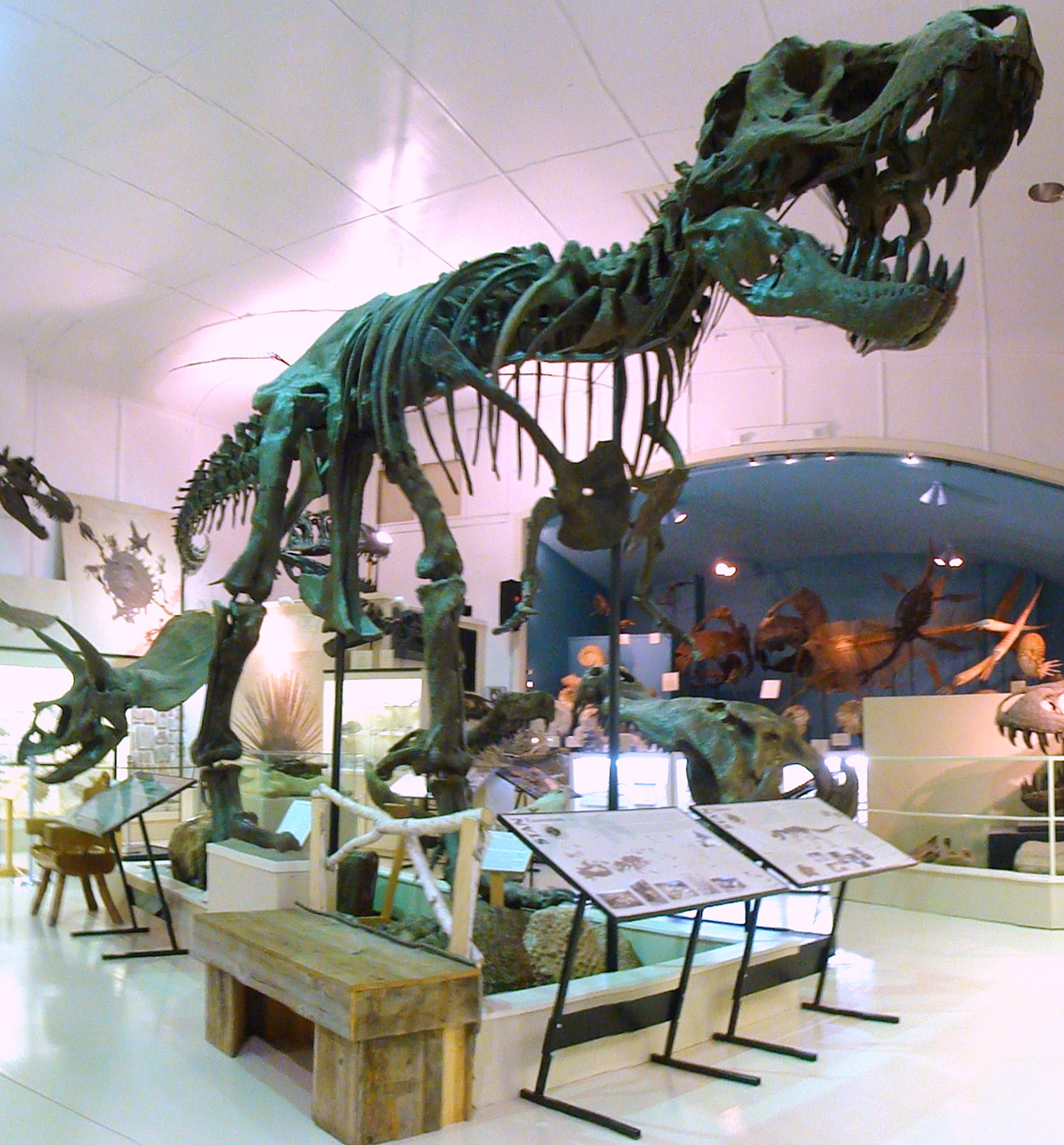
"Stan" at Black Hills Institute

Stan is the nickname given to a fossil about 11.78 m (38 ft) long found in Hell Creek Formation, South Dakota, close to Buffalo in 1987 by Stan Sacrison, who also discovered the Tyrannosaurus specimen nicknamed "Duffy". The original fossils were once housed at Black Hills Institute of Geological Research, Inc. center. It is a well known specimen, and one of the most complete, with 199 bones recovered. About 30 casts of the original fossil have been sold worldwide, each for a price of about $100,000. Stan's skeleton was auctioned for $31.8 million in a 2020 Christie's New York sale, making it a record-breaking dinosaur sale, with the buyer eventually being revealed as the under construction Natural History Museum Abu Dhabi in the Saadiyat Cultural District. The museum opened on November 22, 2025. Stan has been given a new accession number, NHMAD 2020.00001.

Like many other fossils of Tyrannosaurus rex, the skeleton of Stan shows many broken and healed bones. These include broken ribs and damages in the skull. One of the most prominent injuries are in the neck and the skull. A piece of bone is missing at the rear, and the skull also bears a hole 1 inch wide, probably made by another Tyrannosaurus. Also, two of the cervical vertebrae are fused, and another has additional bone growth. This could have been caused by another Tyrannosaurus bite. The bite marks are healed, indicating that Stan survived the wounds. Stan could also have been infected by Trichomonas-like parasites.

== "Wankel Rex": MOR 555 ==
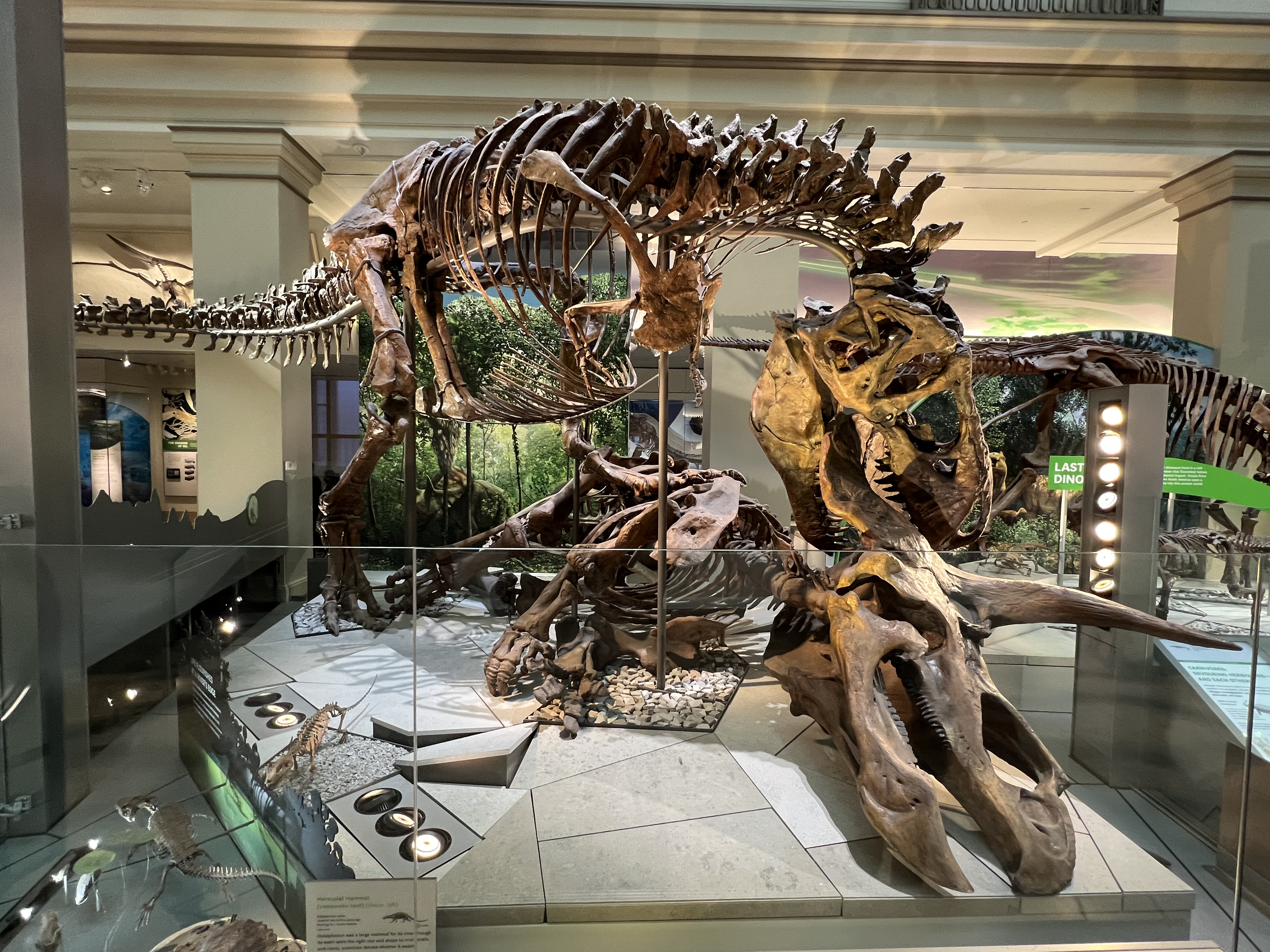
"The nation's T. rex" mount in the Smithsonian Museum

In 1988, local rancher Kathy Wankel discovered another Tyrannosaurus rex in Hell Creek sediments on an island in the Charles M. Russell National Wildlife Refuge of Montana. This specimen was excavated by a team from the Museum of the Rockies led by paleontologist Jack Horner, with assistance from the U.S. Army Corps of Engineers. The specimen, given the number MOR 555 but informally called the "Wankel rex," includes approximately 80-85 percent of the skeleton, including the skull, as well as what at the time was the first complete T. rex forelimb. It has an estimated length of around 11.6 meters (38 ft) and a weight between 5.8 metric tons (6.4 short tons) and 10.8 metric tons (11.9 short tons) in newer figures. It is estimated that the "Wankel rex" was 18 years old when it died, an adult but not completely grown. The "Wankel rex" was also one of the first fossil dinosaur skeletons studied to see if biological molecules still existed within the fossilized bones. Doctoral candidate Mary Schweitzer found heme, a biological form of iron that makes up hemoglobin (the red pigment in blood).

2018 VOA report about "The nation's T. rex"

It was long on exhibit at the Museum of the Rockies in Bozeman, Montana. In June 2013, the Corps loaned the specimen to the National Museum of Natural History, Smithsonian Institution museum in Washington, D.C., for 50 years. (The Museum of the Rockies continues to display a cast reconstruction of the skull by Michael Holland). The specimen went on temporary display on National Fossil Day, 16 October 2013, and was exhibited until the museum's dinosaur hall exhibit closed for renovation in the spring of 2014. The skeleton, named "The Nation's T. rex" became the centerpiece of the dinosaur hall when it reopened in 2019. Casts of MOR 555 are on display at the National Museum of Scotland, the Australian Fossil and Mineral Museum, Houston Museum of Natural Science Sugar Land, and the University of California Museum of Paleontology. A bronze cast of the specimen, known as "Big Mike", stands outside the Museum of the Rockies.

In 2022, Gregory S. Paul and colleagues argued that the Wankel rex was not actually a T. rex, but rather the holotype for a new species: Tyrannosaurus regina. This was heavily criticized by several other leading paleontologists, including Stephen Brusatte, Thomas Carr, Thomas Holtz, David Hone, Jingmai O'Connor, and Lindsay Zanno when they were approached by various media outlets for comment. Their criticism was subsequently published in a technical paper.

== "Sue": FMNH PR2081 ==
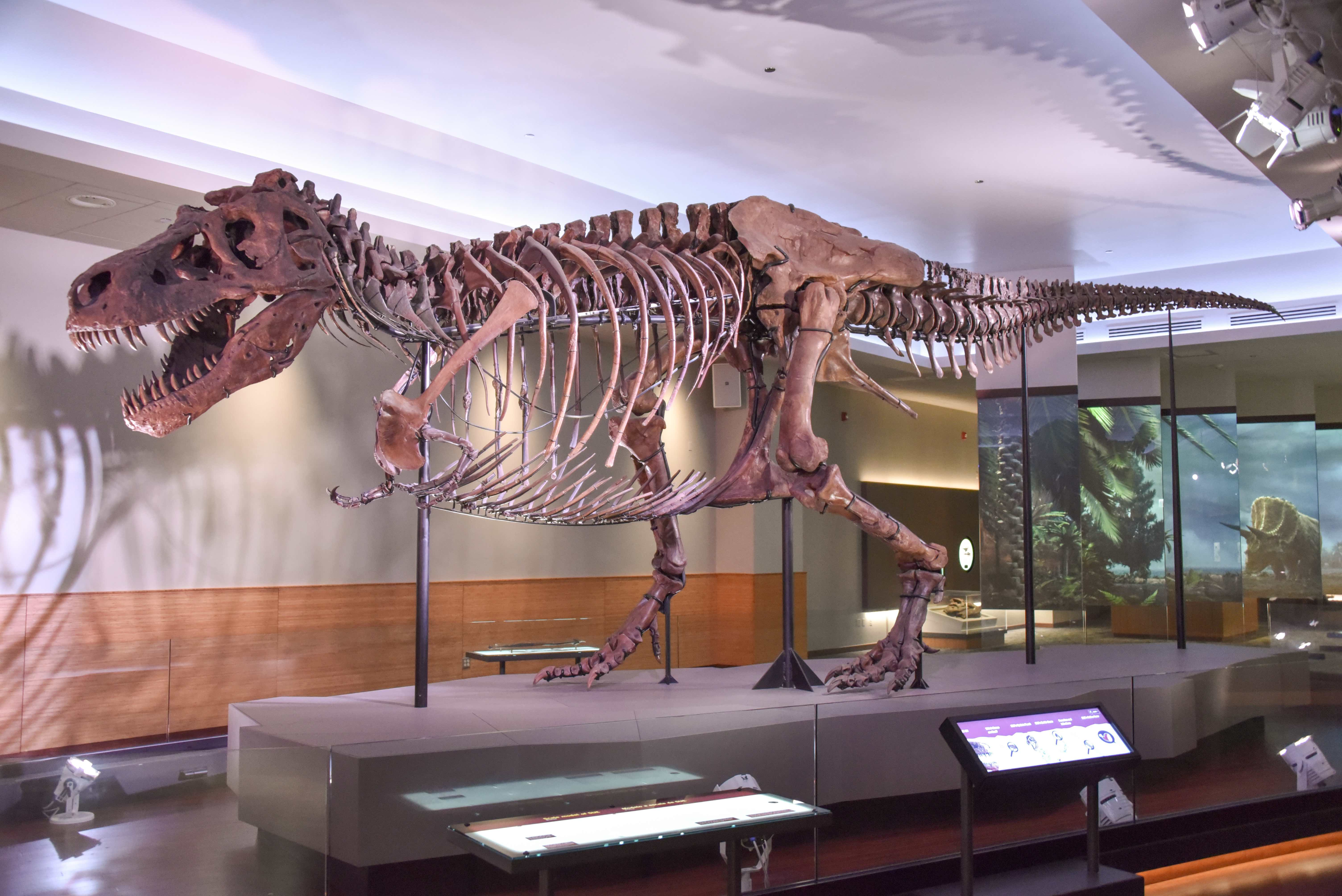
"Sue" specimen, Field Museum of Natural History, Chicago

Susan Hendrickson of the Black Hills Institute discovered the best-preserved Tyrannosaurus currently known, in the Hell Creek Formation near Faith, South Dakota, on 12 August 1990. About 90% of the skeleton was recovered, allowing the first complete description of a Tyrannosaurus rex skeleton. This specimen, named "Sue" in honor of its discoverer, soon became embroiled in a legal battle over its ownership. The owner of the land where the fossil was found, Maurice Williams, as well as the Sioux Tribe he belonged to, claimed ownership which the Institute had considered itself to have. In 1997, the suit was settled in favor of Williams and the fossil was returned to Williams' ownership. Williams quickly offered up "Sue" for auction by Sotheby's in New York, where it was sold to the Field Museum of Natural History in Chicago for US$8.4 million—the highest price ever paid for a fossil before being surpassed by Stan.

Sue has a length of 12.3–12.4 meters (40.4–40.7 ft), stands 3.66–3.96 m (12–13 ft) tall at the hips, and according to the most recent studies estimated to have weighed between 8.4 and 14 metric tons when alive. It has been hypothesised that Sue's impressive size may have been achieved due to a prolonged ontogenic development, since it is the third oldest Tyrannosaurus known. Sue's age at the time of death was estimated by Peter Mackovicky and the University of Florida to be 28 years old, over 6–10 years older than most big Tyrannosaurus specimens, like MOR 555, AMNH 5027 or BHI 3033. The only known specimen of T. rex that is older than Sue is Trix.

Preparation of "Sue" (FMNH PR2081) was completed at the Field Museum and the skeleton was placed on exhibit on 17 May 2000.

== "Montana's T. rex": MOR980 ==
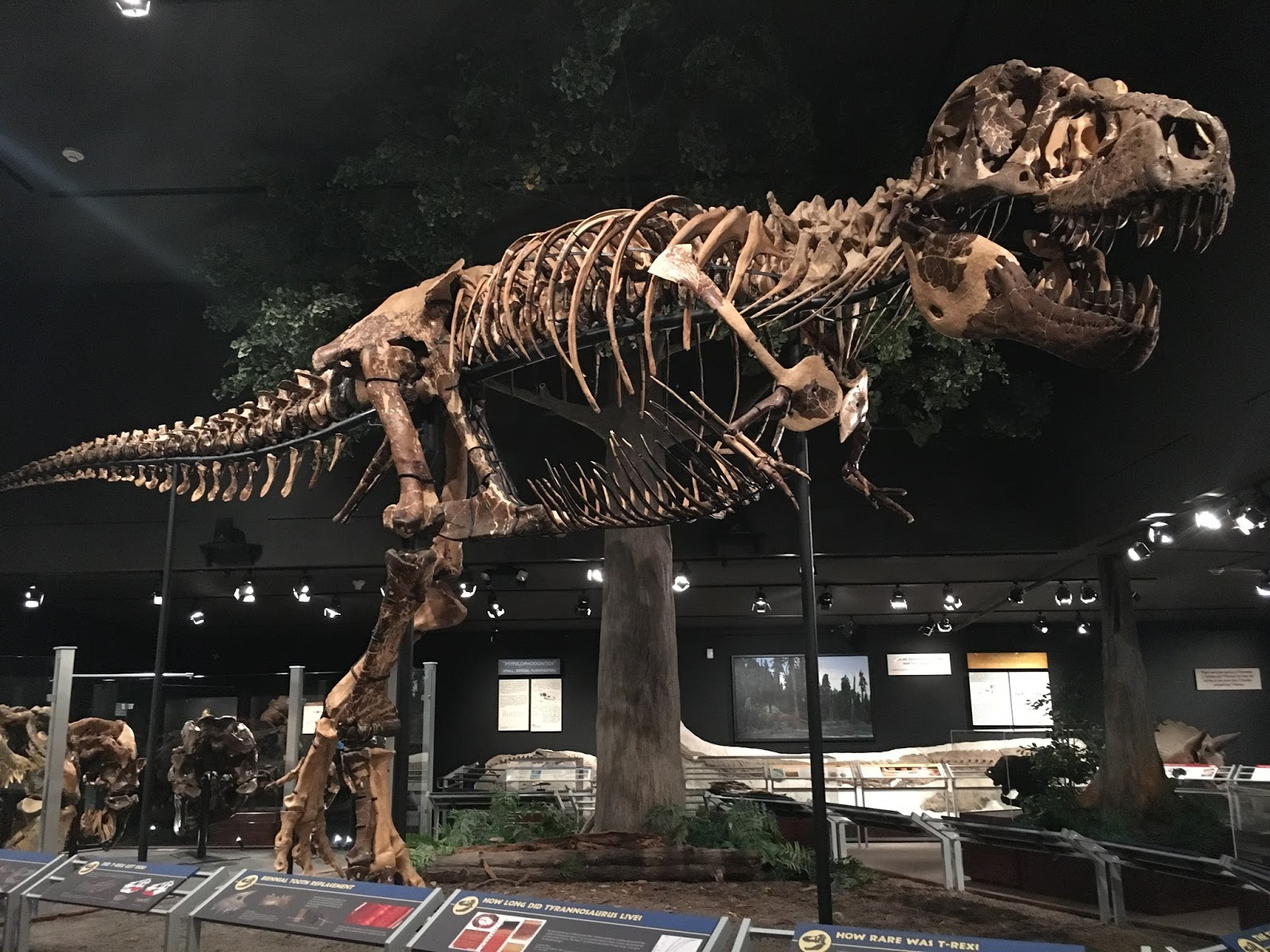
Montana's T. rex (formerly nicknamed "Peck's Rex) real fossils displayed at the Museum of the Rockies

Montana's T. rex (also known as "Peck's rex", "Peckrex", "Rigby's rex" and Tyrannosaurus "imperator") is the nickname given to a fossil specimen found in Montana in 1997. The discovery was made by Louis E. Tremblay on 4 July 1997 working under the supervision of J. Keith Rigby Jr. who led the excavation and bone preparation.

The skeleton of Montana's T. rex includes a relatively complete skull with jaws, multiple vertebrae of the back and tail, a well preserved gastralium, and hipbone with complete ischium and pubis. The left hindleg is relatively complete with a 1.2-meter-long (3.9 ft) femur, missing only some toe bones. The forelimbs include the scapula and furcula, both humeri and right hand phalanges, as well as metacarpal III. Montana's T. rex has been the subject of research regarding parasitic infections in dinosaurs. The forelimbs of Montana's T. rex have also been studied as they show evidence of use. This evidence includes the construction of metacarpal III, as well as repeated fractures in the furcula—possibly caused by heavy loads or pressure (Carpenter and Lipkin, 2005).

The fossils of Montana's T. rex are exhibited at Museum of the Rockies as part of a full skeletal mount completed with cast elements replacing the missing bones. This mount was installed after the Wankel Rex (now nicknamed The Nation's T. rex) was loaned to the Smithsonian to occupy a central part in the museum's dinosaur hall, featuring a dynamic mount showing the apex predator devouring a Triceratops carcass. It has been stated by Pete Makovicky, the Chicago museum's lead curator of dinosaurs, that this specimen is in the same size range as "Sue" and "Scotty".

== "Bucky": TCM 2001.90.1 ==
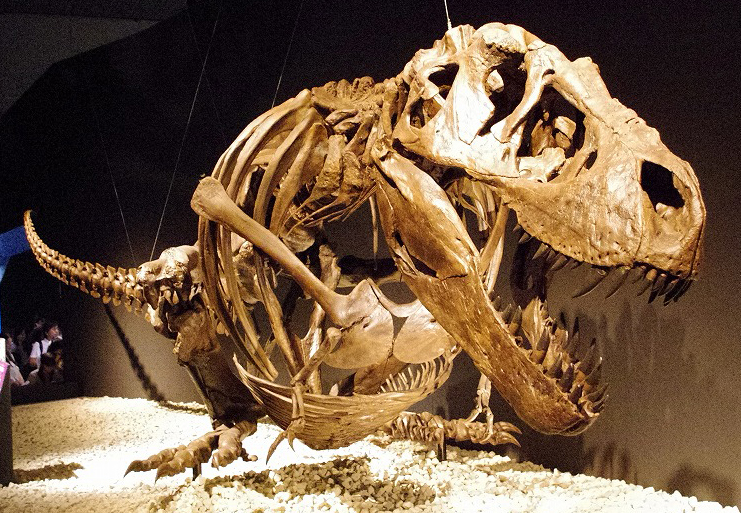
Cast of the "Bucky" specimen

Bucky is a fossil of a juvenile specimen on display at The Children's Museum of Indianapolis in Indianapolis, Indiana. It is the first juvenile Tyrannosaurus ever placed on permanent exhibit in a museum. The dinosaur remains were found in 1998 in the Hell Creek Formation near the town of Faith, South Dakota. The skeleton, transported by water, ended up in a low shallow valley along with bones from an Edmontosaurus and Triceratops. It was discovered by rancher and cowboy Bucky Derflinger. Bucky was well preserved and easily prepared by the Black Hills Institute in South Dakota. Part of The Children's Museum of Indianapolis Dinosphere exhibit, Bucky is displayed along with Stan, an adult Tyrannosaurus, in a hunting scene. Both dinosaurs are attacking a Triceratops specimen known as "Kelsey".

Bucky is one of the few dinosaur fossils found with a furcula; Bucky's furcula was the first one found for the genus Tyrannosaurus. Bucky also has a nearly complete set of gastralia, or belly ribs, and an ulna, or lower arm bone. As of now, 101 bones, or about 34% of Bucky's skeleton, has been discovered and verified. Bucky is the sixth-most complete Tyrannosaurus rex out of more than 40 that have been discovered.

== "E. D. Cope": BHI 6248 ==
E. D. Cope (named after the paleontologist of the same name) is a Tyrannosaurus specimen discovered in South Dakota by Bucky Derflinger in 1999 at the same site as AMNH 3982. Excavations of this 10% complete skeleton began in 2000. The known material includes a partial skull, several vertebrae, and ribs. A very wide femur with a length of 1300 mm and a circumference of 630 mm is also known.

== "B-rex": MOR 1125 ==
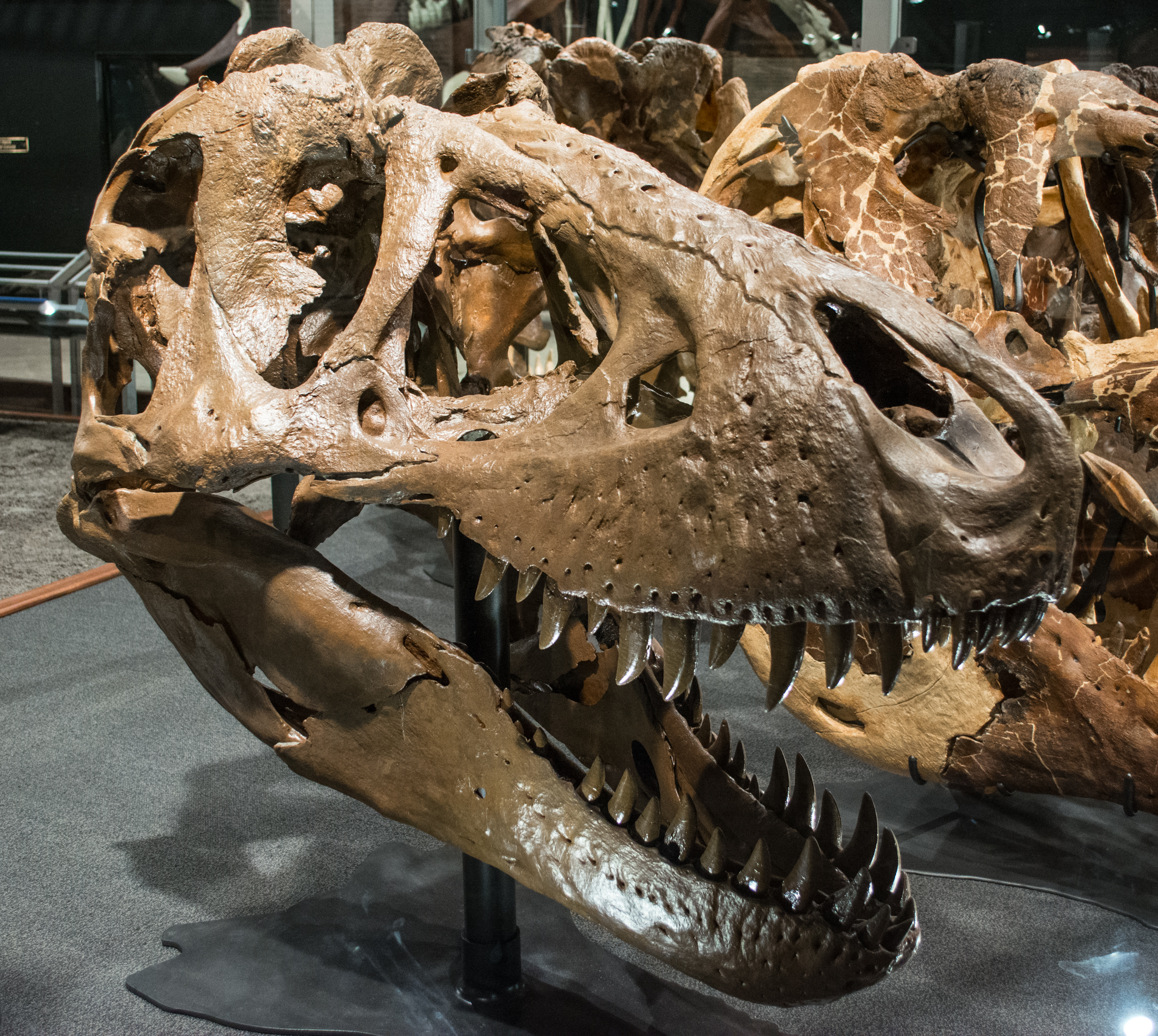
Reconstructed skull of B-rex

This specimen was found in the lower portion of the Hell Creek Formation near Fort Peck Lake in the Charles M. Russell National Wildlife Refuge in Garfield County, Montana. Its discoverer was Bob Harmon, a fossil preparator for the Museum of the Rockies, and was nicknamed the "B-rex" (or "Bob-rex") in honor of Harmon. The specimen was discovered in 2000, and excavated by MOR from 2001 to 2003. Although only 37 percent of the skeleton was present, this included almost all of the skull (although the skull was nearly completely disarticulated). The specimen also includes several cervical, dorsal, sacral, and caudal vertebrae; several chevrons; some cervical and dorsal ribs; left scapula and coracoid; the furcula; the left ulna; both femora, tibiae, and ulnae; the right calcaneum; right astragalus; and a number of pes phalanges.

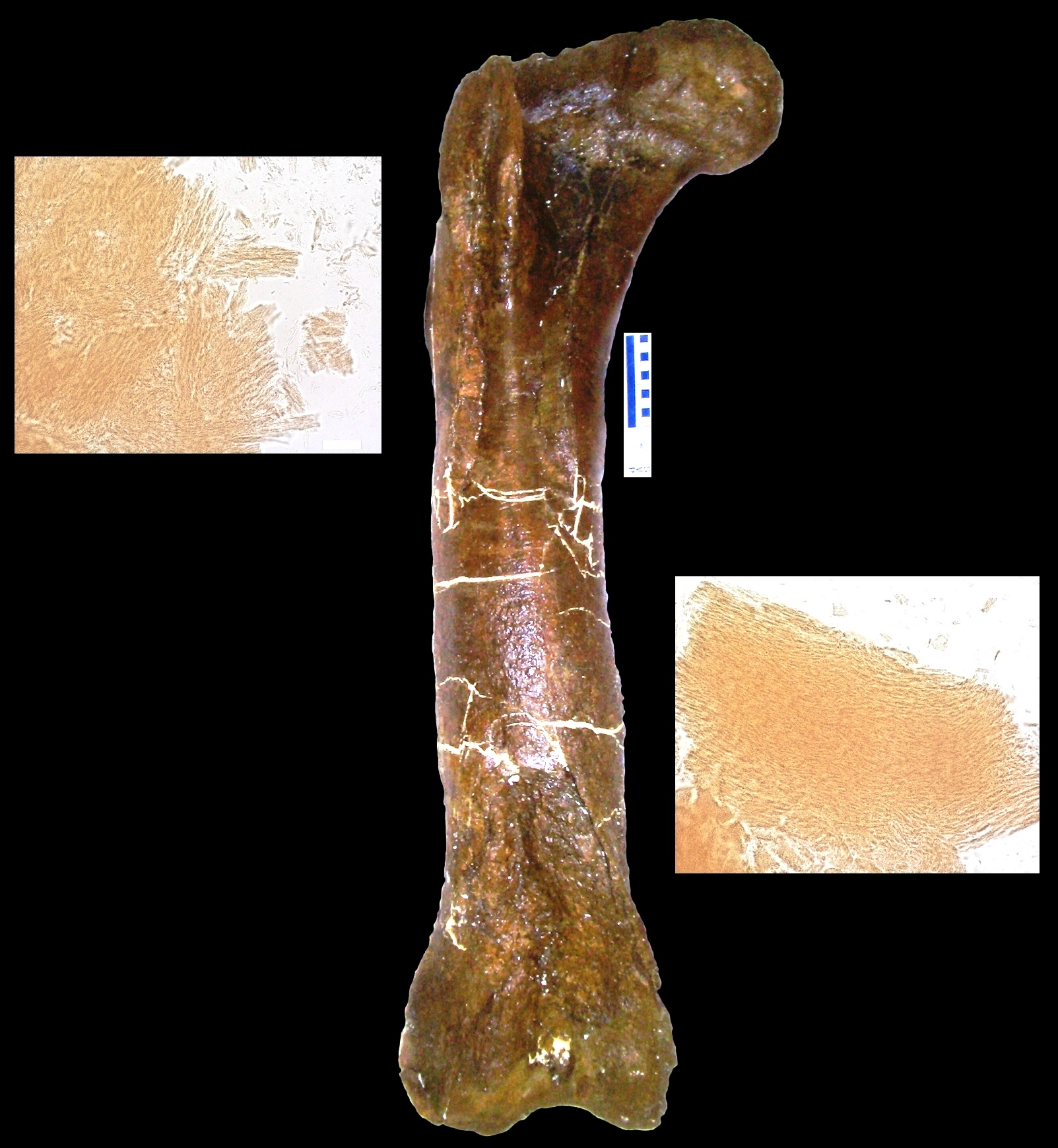
Femur of MOR 1125 from which demineralized matrix and peptides (insets) were obtained

In the March 2005 Science magazine, Mary Higby Schweitzer of North Carolina State University and colleagues announced the recovery of soft tissue from the marrow cavity of a fossilized femur belong to B-Rex. Flexible, bifurcating blood vessels and fibrous but elastic bone matrix tissue were recognized. In addition, microstructures resembling blood cells were found inside the matrix and vessels. The structures bear resemblance to ostrich blood cells and vessels. However, since an unknown process distinct from normal fossilization seems to have preserved the material, the researchers are being careful not to claim that it is original material from the dinosaur. Paleontologist Thomas Kaye of the University of Washington in Seattle hypothesized that the soft-tissue is permineralized biofilm created by bacteria while digesting and breaking down the original specimen. He has discovered this to be true in many specimens from the same area. In 2016, it was finally confirmed by Mary Higby Schweitzer and Lindsay Zanno et al that the soft tissue was medullary bone tissue, like that in modern birds when they are readying to lay eggs. This confirmed the identity of the Tyrannosaurus MOR 1125 as a female.

== "Samson" ==
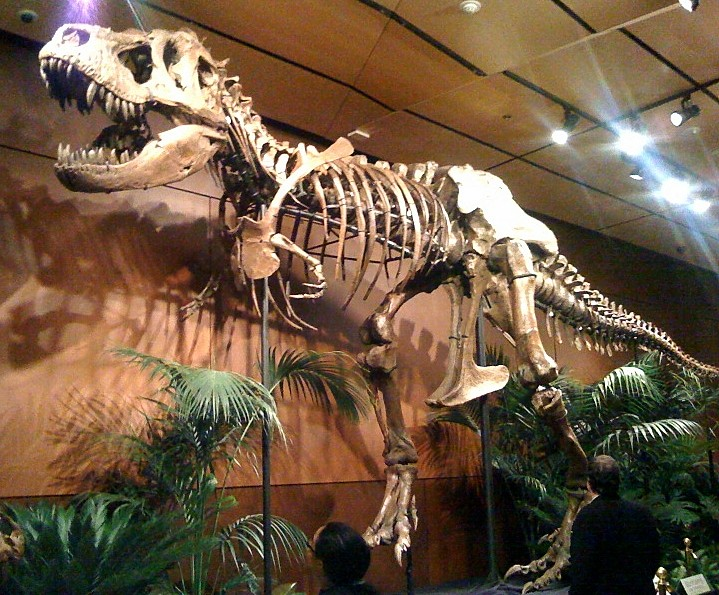
Samson

A T. rex specimen was discovered on private land in Harding County, South Dakota, once in 1981 by Michael and Dee Zimmerschied, and again on 4 October 1992 (Alan and Robert Detrich re-discovered Samson after it was originally found and deemed by paleontologists that several bones had washed in and there was nothing left). It was shortly after that when Fred Nuss and Candace Nuss of Nuss Fossils with the Detrich brothers found the most complete and undistorted Tyrannosaurus rex skull ever discovered. Following the sale of "Sue," another Tyrannosaurus rex skeleton was, the specimen was put up for auction on eBay in 2000 under the name of "Z-rex", with an asking price of over US$8 million. It failed to sell online but was purchased for an undisclosed price in 2001 by British millionaire Graham Ferguson Lacey, who renamed the skeleton "Samson" after the Biblical figure of the same name. It was prepared by the Carnegie Museum starting in May 2004. After preparation was complete in March 2006, the specimen was returned to Lacey. It, along with some other dinosaur skeletons, was sold again at auction on 3 October 2009.

Samson measured 11.9 m (39 ft), only slightly shorter than Sue.

== "Baby Bob" ==
On 7 July 2013, fossil hunter Robert Detrich of Wichita, Kansas, unearthed the remains of what is believed to be a 4-year-old Tyrannosaurus rex. Detrich unearthed the fossil dubbed "Baby Bob" in a fossil-rich area near the Eastern Montana town of Jordan. Its femur measures about 25 inches, and if all the preliminary data pans out, that would make it among the smallest T. rex specimens ever found. Baby Bob has been fully excavated, although it will take another year to clean. Detrich said the skull, which is about 75 percent complete, and most of the major skeletal elements were found strewn across a flood plain, although very few vertebra and ribs were found.

== "Scotty": RSM P2523.8 ==
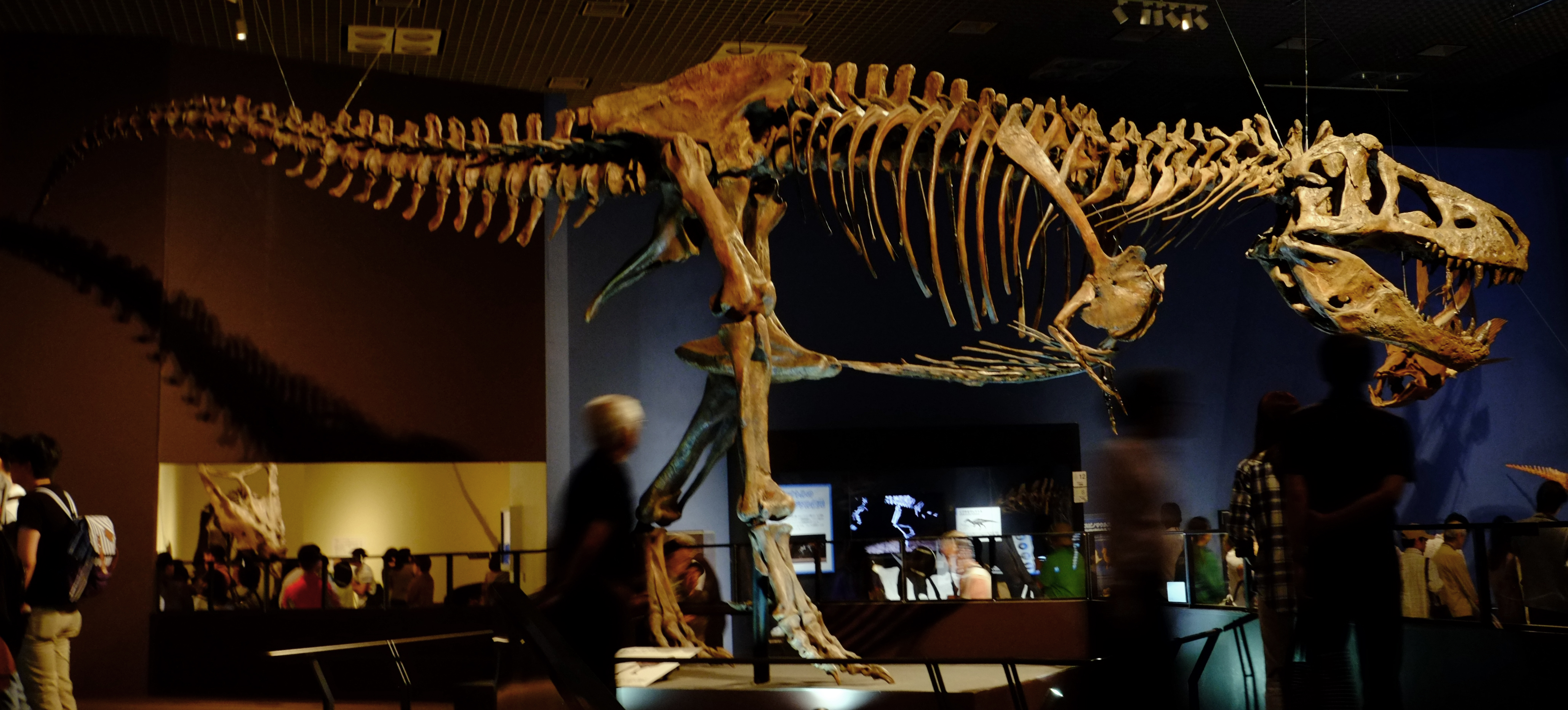
Scotty is currently thought by many to be the largest Tyrannosaurus specimen ever discovered.

"Scotty", cataloged as RSM P2523.8, was discovered in Saskatchewan, Canada in 1991. Since its discovery and extensive subsequent study, "Scotty" has been referred to as the largest T. rex ever discovered in the world, the largest of any dinosaur discovered in Canada, and as one of the oldest and most complete fossils of its kind at more than 70% bulk. "Scotty" resides at the Royal Saskatchewan Museum's T. rex Discovery Centre in Eastend, SK, Canada. In May 2019, a second mount was erected at the Royal Saskatchewan Museum in Regina, where the exhibit reflects the recent discoveries about the fossil.

"Scotty" was discovered by Robert Gebhardt, a high school principal from Eastend, SK who accompanied palaeontologists from the Royal Saskatchewan Museum on a prospective expedition into the Frenchman Formation in southwestern Saskatchewan on 16 August 1991. It wasn't until June 1994 that the Royal Saskatchewan Museum was able to begin the excavation, which was led and overseen by the Museum's Ron Borden, as well as resident paleontologists Tim Tokaryk and John Storer who were with Gebhardt when he uncovered the first fossils. The bones were deeply packed in dense, iron-laden sandstone, which took more than twenty years for the team to fully remove, excavate, and assemble the majority of the skeleton, with additional trips being made to the site to retrieve smaller bones and teeth. The entire process of excavating the skeleton was also slowed down by its considerable size.

"Scotty" is reported to be 13.1 metres (43 feet) long and weighed an estimated 8.8 tonnes (8,800 kg). Despite it not being a complete fossil, paleontologists were able to create the estimation for the weight and length through measurements of important weight bearing bones such as the femur, hip, and shoulder bones that have all been measured to be larger and thicker with "Scotty" than the corresponding bones with "Sue". Going from the latest study "Scotty" exceeds "Sue" in 84.6% of the published measurements.

Like other T. rex fossils, "Scotty" shows signs of trichomoniasis, a parasitic infection in the jaw that left visible holes in the bone and was unique to this specific species of dinosaur. Additionally, a broken and healed rib on its right side, broken tail vertebra, as well as a hole near the eye socket are possibly the result of another T. rex attack. Other abnormalities, such as impacted teeth, suggest that "Scotty" was not only bitten, but also bit other animals.

== "Tristan Otto" ==
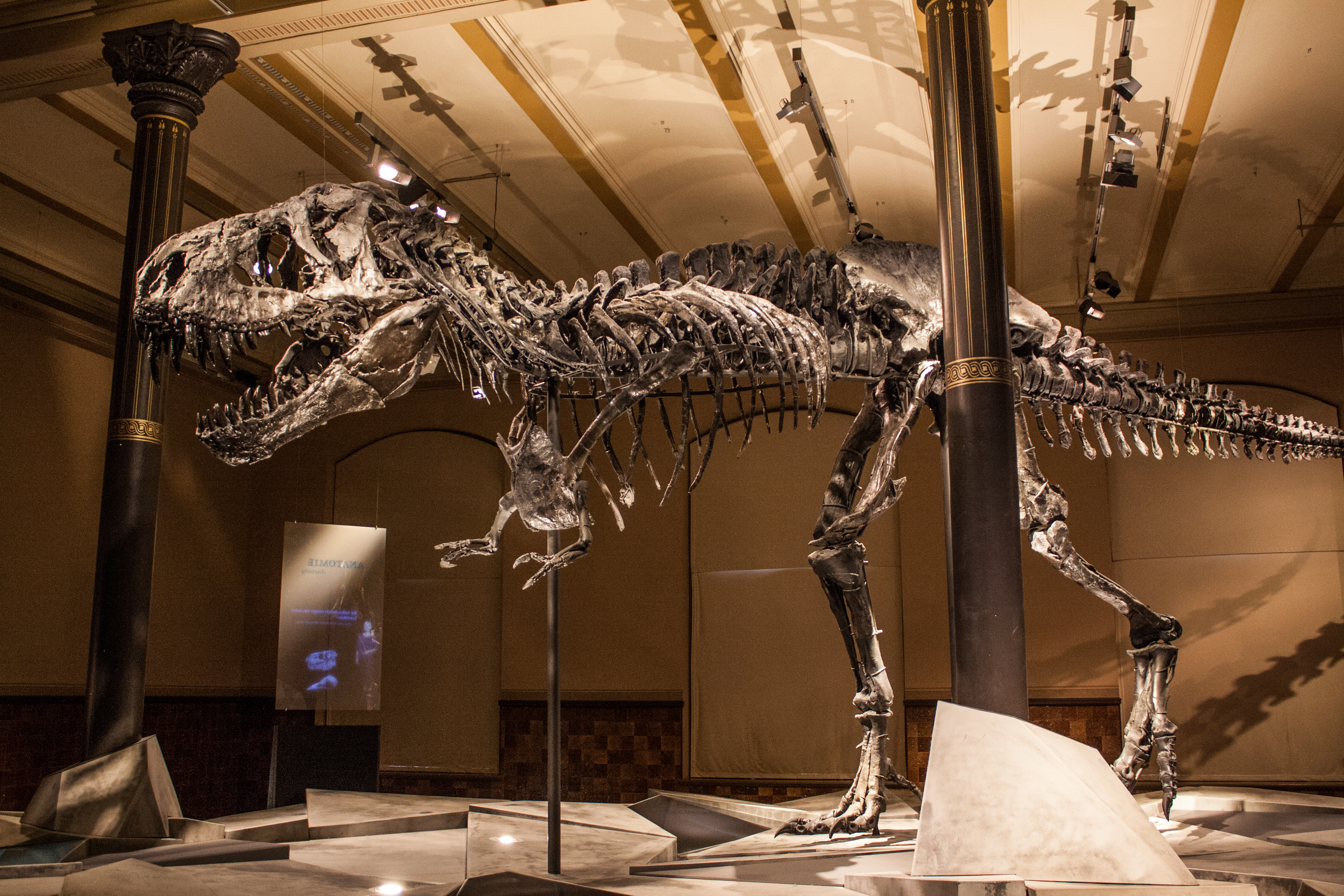
Tristan Otto in Berlin

Commercial paleontologist Craig Pfister discovered the specimen in the lower Hell Creek Formation in Carter County, Montana, in 2010. Its excavation and preservation lasted four years. It was later sold to Danish-born investment banker Niels Nielsen, who loaned the specimen to the Museum für Naturkunde in Berlin, Germany, for research and exhibition where it has been on display since 2015. In 2020, it was loaned for a period of one year to the Natural History Museum of Denmark, to return in 2021. However, the return was delayed by the COVID-19 pandemic and the specimen instead returned to Berlin in July of 2022.

Nielsen and his friend Jens Jensen named the specimen Tristan-Otto (short: Tristan) for their sons. The Museum für Naturkunde Berlin lists it under specimen number MB.R.91216. Several European museums have Tyrannosaurus casts (replicas) or parts, but Tristan is one of only two original skeletons on display in the continent (the other is "Trix" in the Netherlands). The matte-black fossilised skeleton is about 12 m (39 ft) long and 3.4 m (11 ft) tall at the hips. Tristan is among the most complete known Tyrannosaurus skeletons: It was re-assembled from about 300 separate parts, 170 of which are original (including 98% of the skull and all the teeth), the rest reproductions. It is estimated to have died when about 20 years old and it was in poor health, having several bone fractures, bite marks to the skull and signs of disease in the jaw. The disease present in Tristan's jaw was suggested to be a case of tumefactive osteomyelitis.

== "Thomas": LACM 150167 ==
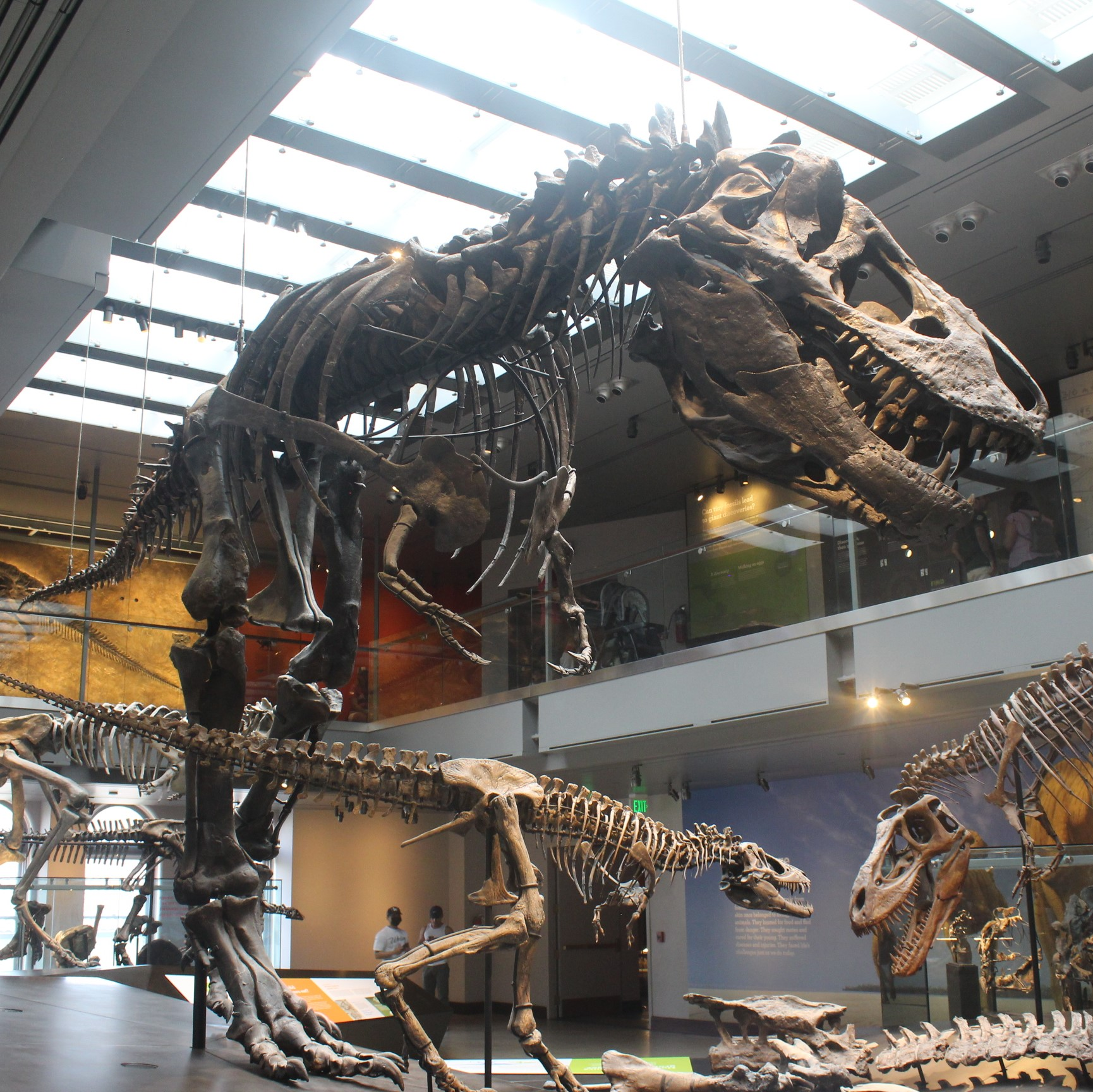
Thomas, mounted with two younger specimens

From 2003 to 2005, Thomas was excavated by NHMLA paleontologists in southeastern Montana. At 17 years old, 34 ft (10 m) long and nearly 7,000 lb (3,200 kg), it is estimated to be a 70% complete specimen. Thomas is mounted in a "growth series" with the youngest-known Tyrannosaurus rex fossil, a two-year-old, 11-foot-long (3.4 m) specimen, and a 13-year-old, 20-foot-long (6.1 m) juvenile specimen.

This fossil is one of the geologically youngest T. rex specimens known, discovered very near the Cretaceous–Tertiary boundary.

== "Victoria" ==
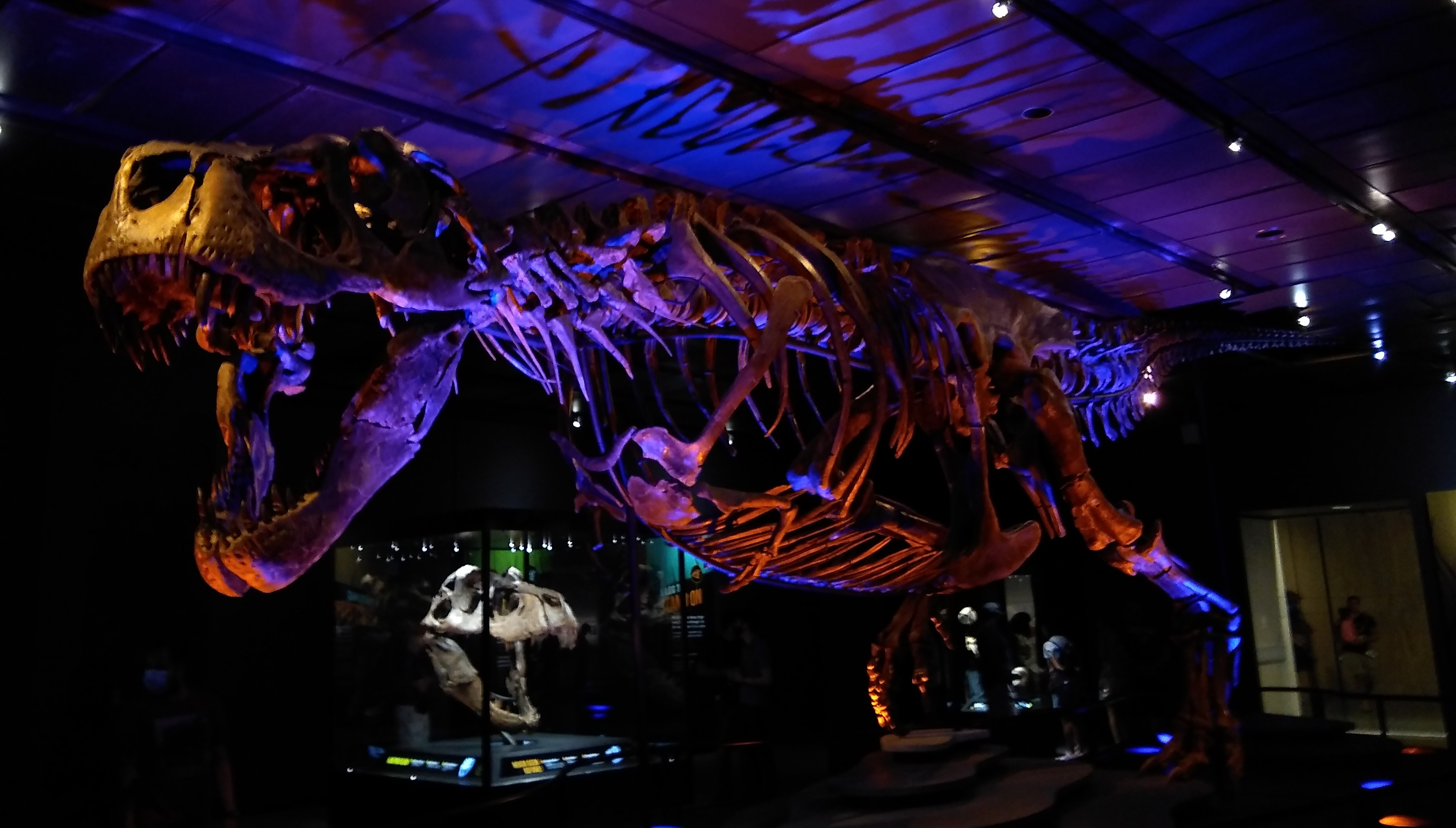
Victoria on display at HMNS

Victoria is a specimen found near Faith, South Dakota in 2013. Victoria is estimated to be around 12 ft tall and 40 ft long, and she is thought to have died in her subadult stage, between 15 and 25 years of age. Victoria has also been the subject of a traveling exhibition being displayed in places such as the Arizona Science Center. Her cause of death is unknown; however, she was believed to have been bitten in the lower jaw by another Tyrannosaurus. The bite may have become infected, spreading and leading to sepsis.

== "Ivan" ==
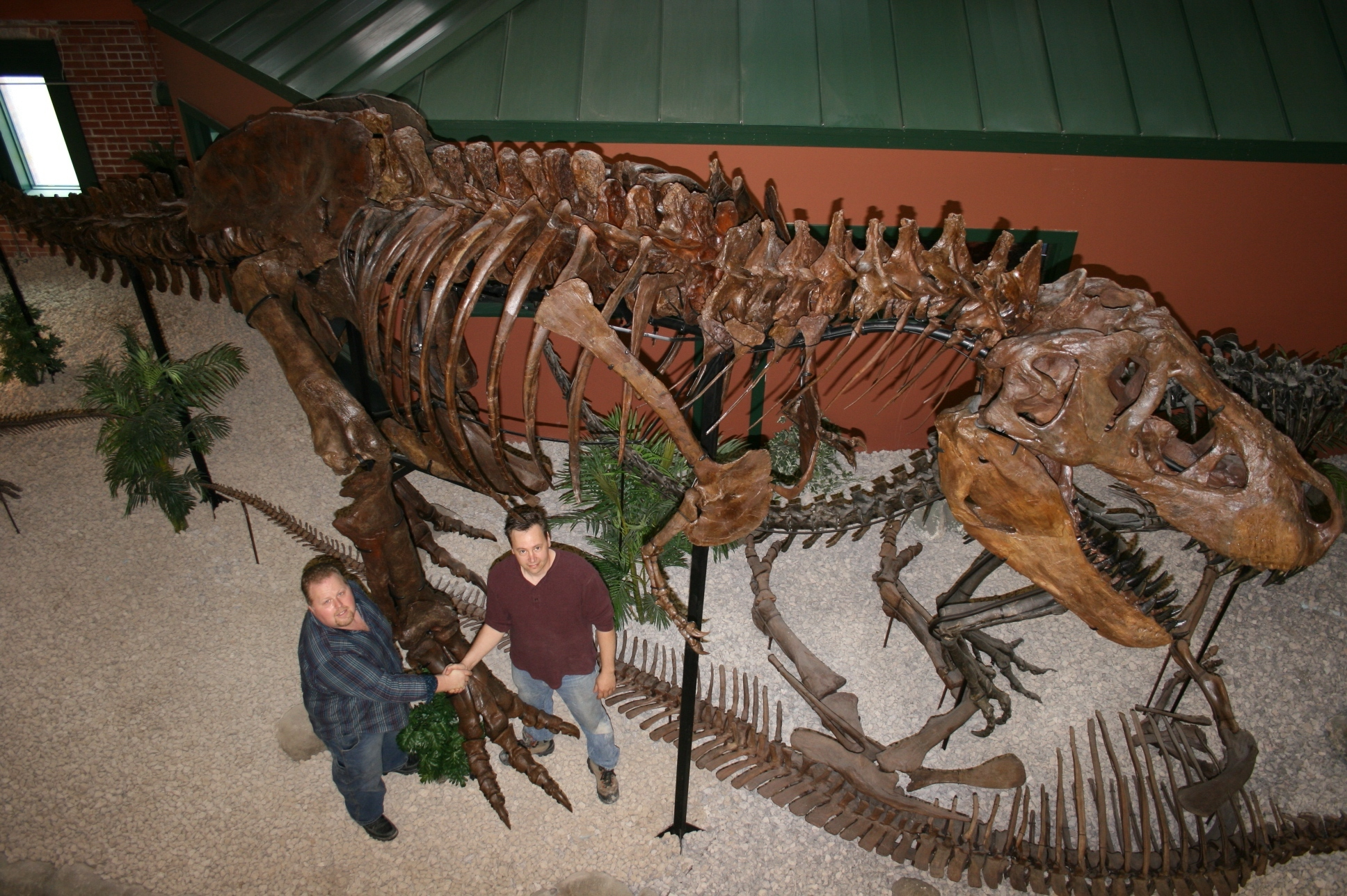
Ivan the T. rex, during installation

Ivan is a 65% complete T. rex displayed at the Museum of World Treasures in Wichita, Kansas. The specimen has the most complete tail of any T. rex, only missing around 3 vertebrae. Ivan is around 40 ft long and 12 feet high.

== "Trix": RGM 792.000 ==
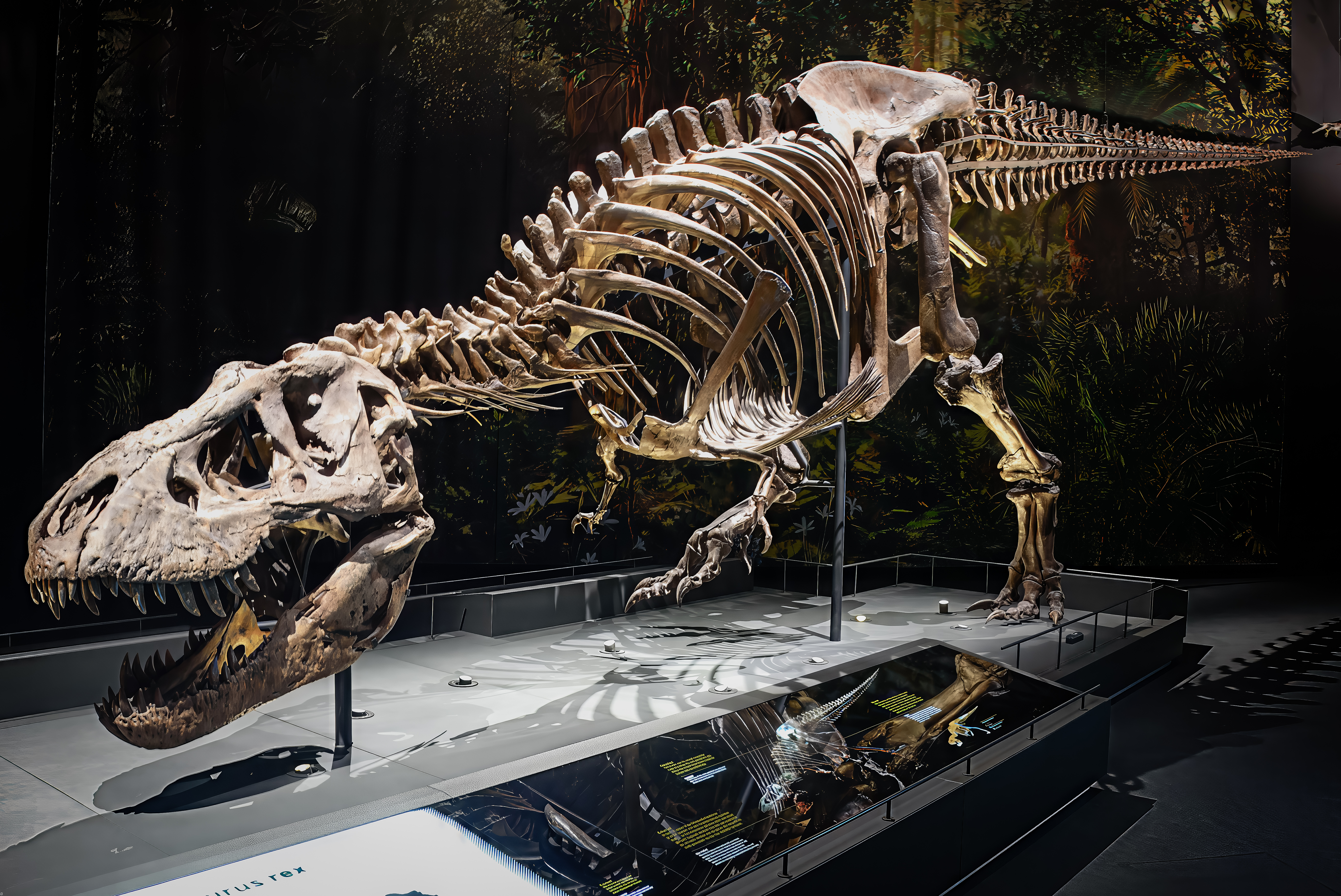
Mounted skeleton of Trix

In 2013, a team of paleontologists from the Naturalis Biodiversity Center (Leiden, Netherlands) traveled to Montana where they discovered and unearthed a large and remarkably complete Tyrannosaurus rex specimen that lived 67 million years ago. Black Hills institute collaborated with the team in the excavation. The bones were cleaned and assembled in a mount at Black Hills Institute's installations, with the help of both Chicago's Field Museum of Natural History and the Naturalis Museum in Leiden. Chicago's Field museum sent digital models of their famous specimen, FMNH PR 2081 (Sue) to complete the cast and Naturalis museum replicated the bones using 3D-printing technology.

The specimen was named Trix after former Netherlands' Queen Beatrix. At arrival in the Netherlands, it started touring on public display in an itinerant exhibition titled T. rex in Town. The first exhibit spanned from 10 September 2016 to 5 June 2017 and was set at the only room of the Naturalis museum open to public at the time (the 17th-century building known as Pesthuis), due to the fact that the museum was undergoing restoration. When the Netherlands exhibition ended, it continued travelling through other European countries in 2017, 2018 and 2019. As of August 2019, Trix was returned to display at the Naturalis museum where it is installed in a special room that was under construction during Trix's European tour.

According to Peter Larson (director of Black Hills Institute), Trix is among the most complete Tyrannosaurus found. Between 75% and 80% of its skeletal volume was recovered. They are thought to have been at least 30 years old at death.

== "Titus" ==
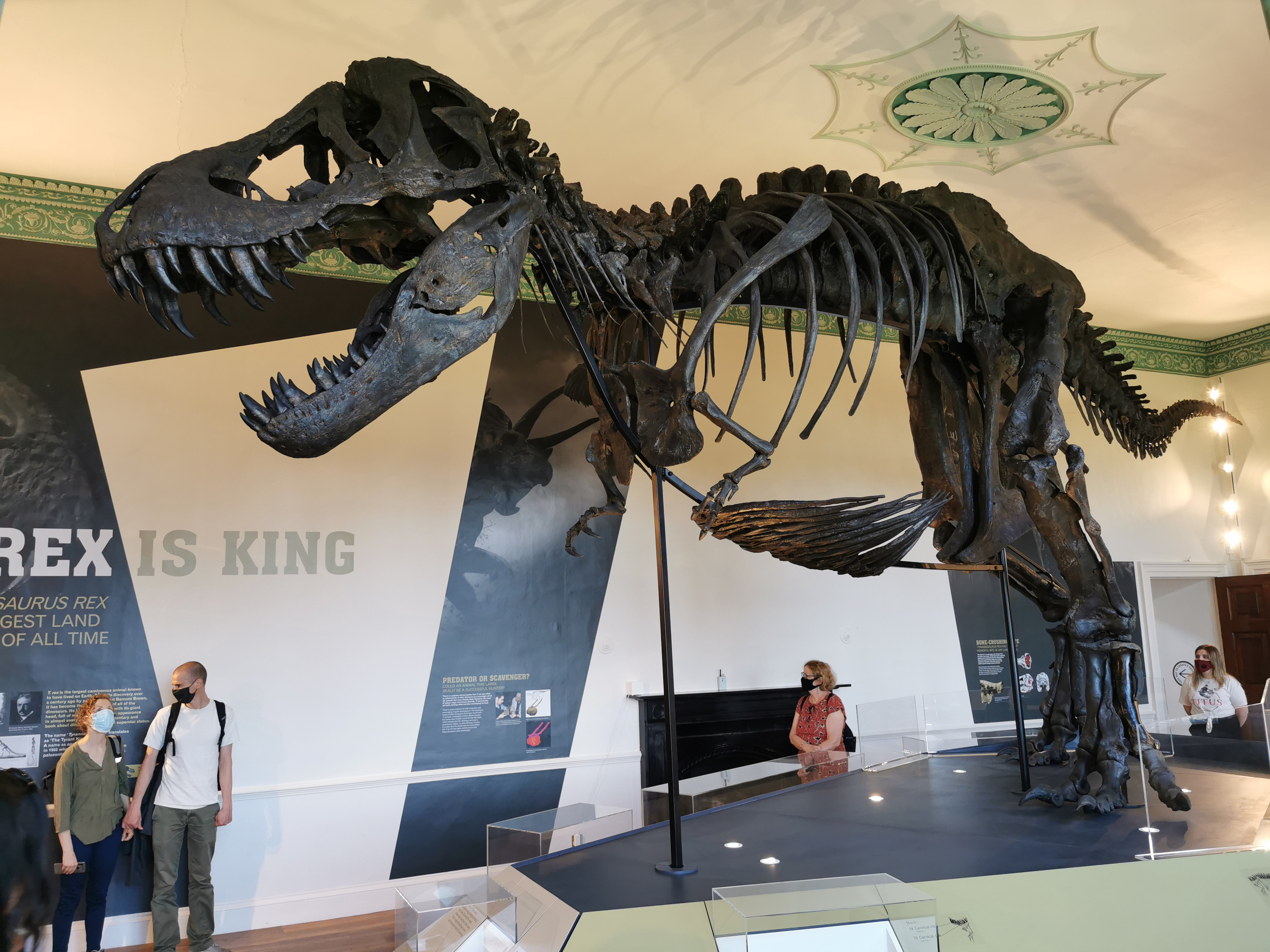
Cast of T. rex skeleton incorporating authentic fossil elements from "Titus", exhibited at Wollaton Hall, Nottingham

"Titus" is the name given to an obsidian-black skeleton of a Tyrannosaurus rex discovered in Montana's Hell Creek Formation in 2014 and excavated in 2018. It is 20% complete, and was named after the protagonist in Shakespeare's Titus Andronicus. Exhibited in the Nottingham Natural History Museum for 13 months beginning July 2021, it was during that time only the second specimen of Tyrannosaurus to be on exhibit in United Kingdom, the other being the type of the junior synonym Dynamosaurus imperosus which has the jaw on display in the Natural History Museum, London. External bone inspection has revealed injuries to Titus' right tibia (possibly a claw or bite wound); a deformed toe on the right foot; and a bitten and healed tail. The bite wound near the end of the tail indicates a possible attack by another Tyrannosaurus rex.

The remains of "Titus" were discovered in September 2014 by commercial paleontologist Craig Pfister near Ekalaka, Carter County, Montana. Excavation of the specimen began in 2018, and took 18 months. The bones of "Titus" were shipped to conservationist Nigel Larkin in the UK, who constructed the mount using a cast of the Tyrannosaurus specimen Stan to supplement the known bones of "Titus", after scanning the bones using photogrammetry to create digital models that were 3D printed for use in the exhibition, alongside the display of the real fossil skeleton, and which remained at the museum after the end of the exhibition. For the exhibit at the Nottingham Natural History Museum at Wollaton Hall, Titus was reconstructed in a walking pose.

== "Tufts-Love": UWBM 99000 ==
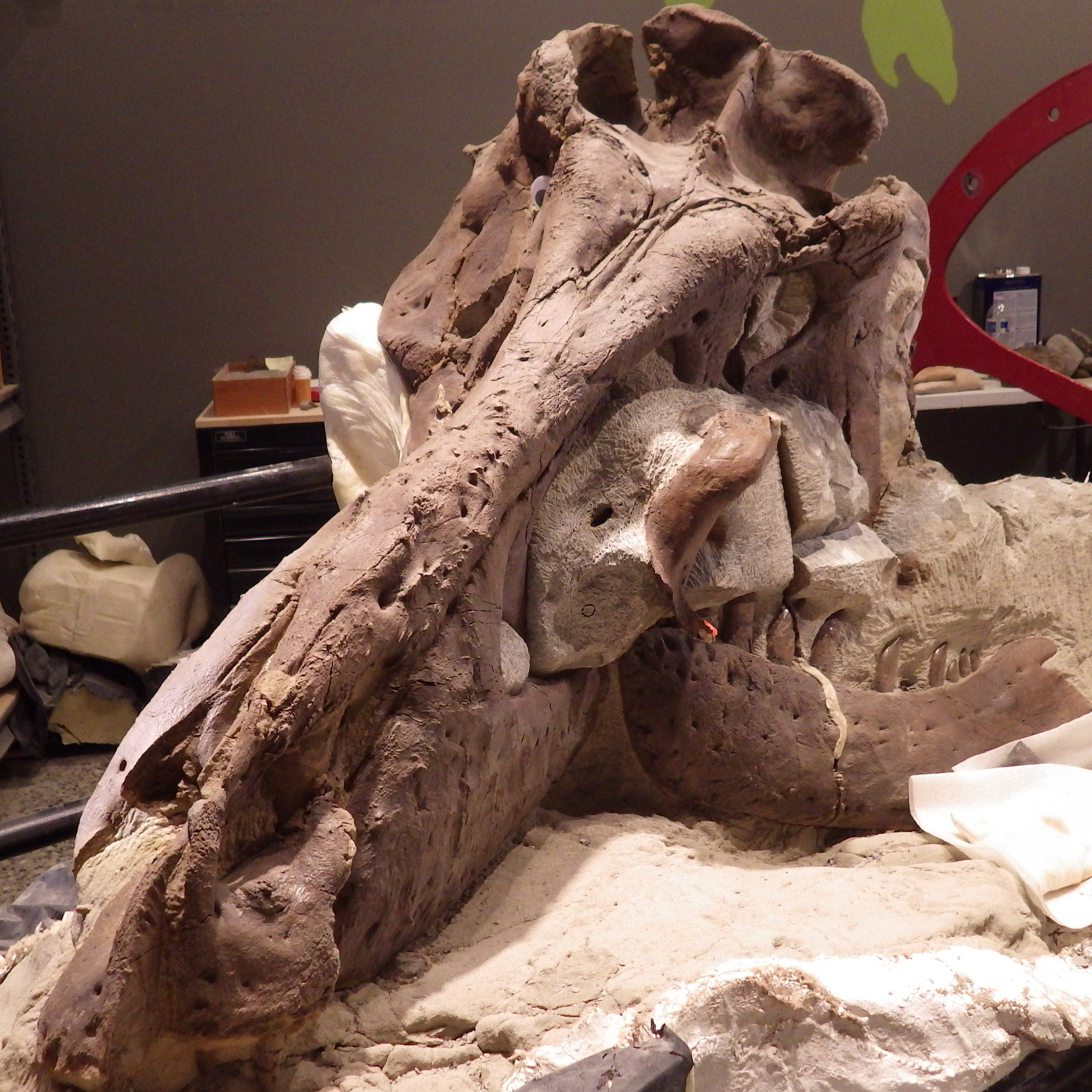
Tufts-Love T. rex

In 2016 Greg Wilson, David DeMar, and a paleontology team from the Burke Museum of Natural History and Culture, the University of Washington, and the Dig Field school excavated the partial remains of a Tyrannosaurus rex from Montana. The partial skeleton was found by two Burke Museum volunteers, Jason Love and Luke Tufts, and was named the "Tufts-Love" rex. Paleontologists at the Burke Museum believe that the Tufts-Love rex was around 15 years old when it died. The skull is of average size for an adult T. rex. The specimen was found in Late Cretaceous deposits and it is estimated to be 66.3 million years old. The Tufts-Love rex is undergoing preparation by Michael Holland and his team at the Burke Museum. The skeleton is estimated to be 30% complete, but it includes a complete (all of the bones of the skull and jaws are preserved) and mostly articulated skull. Holland describes the skull as minimally distorted and in an "exquisite" state of preservation.

== "Peter": AWMM-IL 2022.9 ==
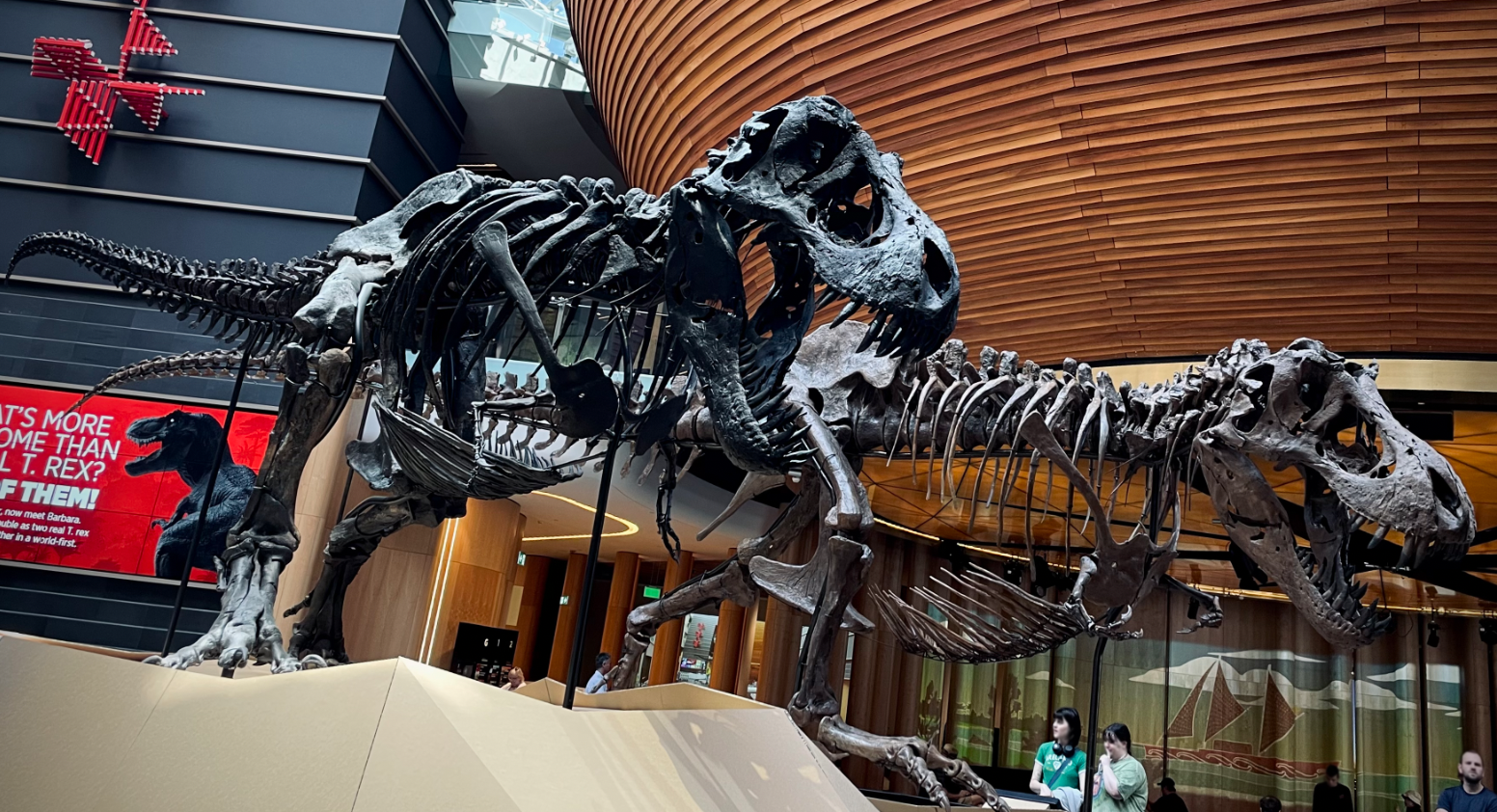
Peter (L) & Barbara (R) side by side 2022

Peter is the nickname given to a specimen on loan to the Auckland War Memorial Museum by an anonymous owner, currently on display alongside "Barbara" until the end of 2023. The specimen is estimated to be 66.8 million years old and almost of adult size. He was recovered from Niobrara County, Wyoming.

"Peter" is one of only four incredibly rare obsidian black colored tyrannosaurus rexes.

He was likely killed by exocannibalism as entire sections of bone were damaged, and some were split open by huge crushing bite-forces. The nature of the crushing on the femur and tibia, along with size of the bite marks, indicates that these bones were bitten through by another Tyrannosaurus rex. There is also a set of smaller, parallel tooth marks nearby on the shaft that are not attributable to an adult T. rex. Explanations for this behavior range from response to over-crowded populations, limited food supply, sexual dominance, or even play.

== "Barbara": AWMM-IL 2022.21 ==
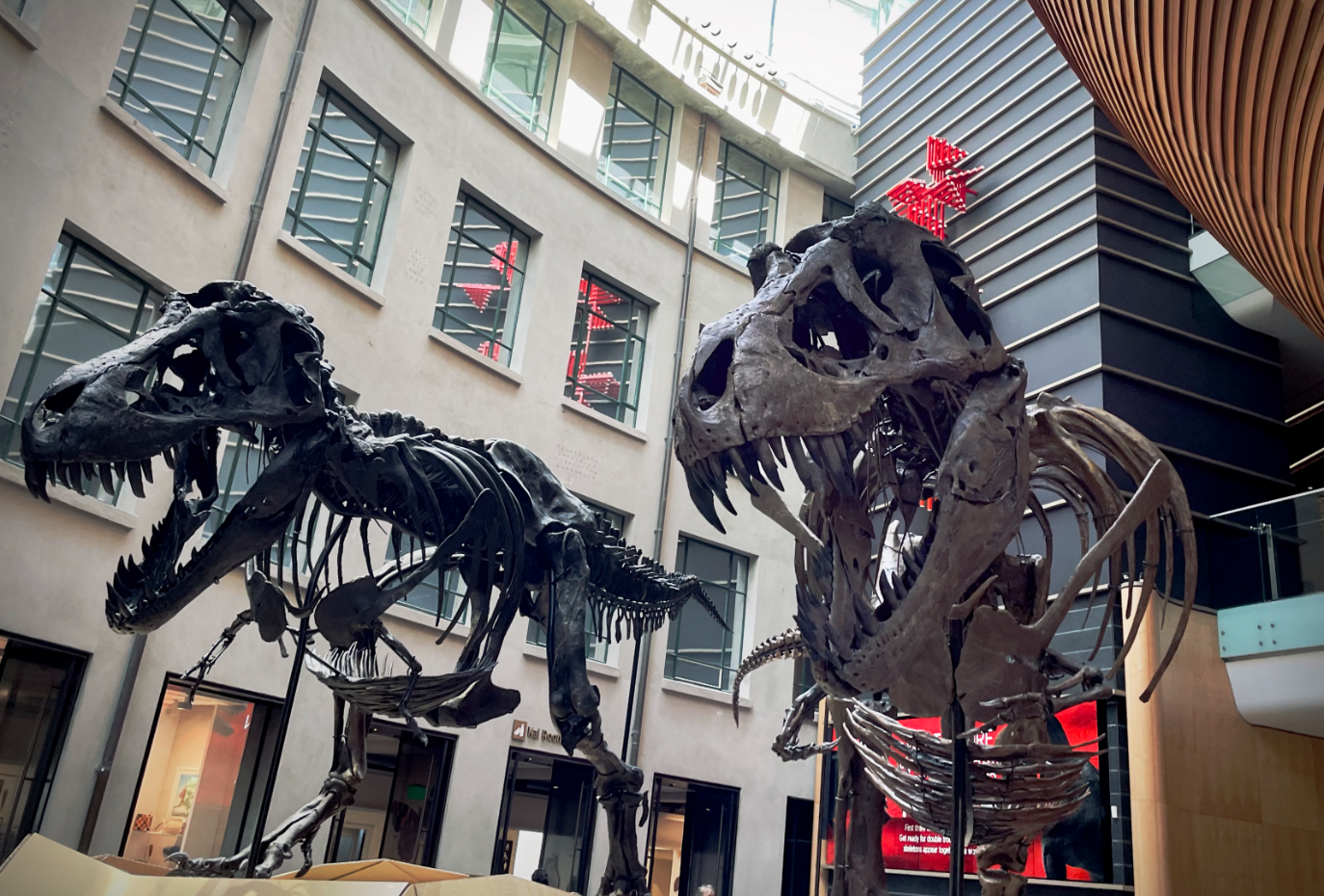
Peter (Black, Left) & Barbara (Right, Beige) Pose at Auckland Museum 2022

Barbara is the nickname given to a specimen on loan to the Auckland War Memorial Museum by the same anonymous owner as "Peter", currently on display alongside him until the end of 2023. The pair will be the first adult male and female T. rex to be displayed together. She is one of a few specimens believed to be pregnant.

"Barbara's" circumstances are particularly rare, more so when taken into account that she suffered and survived long after a debilitating foot injury. While she was no longer able to capture her prey, it is suggested that she got by with the help of a mate or cohort feeding her, as the injury would have rendered her immobile for upwards of 6 months. This is vaguely supported by trackway evidence that has been used to imply tyrannosaur group hunting. It is doubtful that "Barbara" ever successfully hunted again as a predator unless its prey was nearby.

== "Tyson" ==
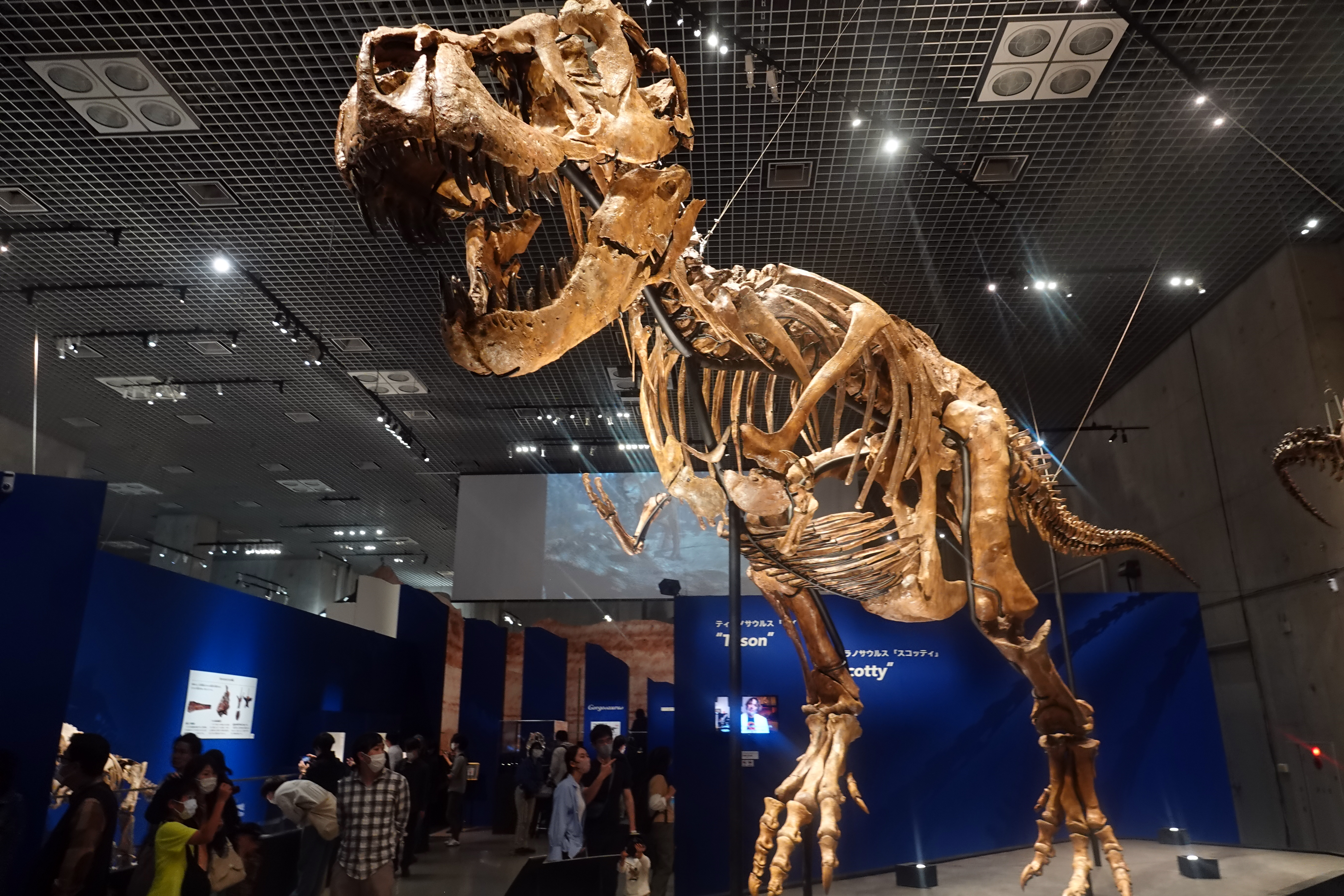
Tyson at the National Museum of Nature and Science 2023

Tyson (タイソン) is the nickname given to a specimen on loan to the National Museum of Nature and Science. It was first shown to the public at a special exhibition held in 2023.

A total of 177 bones are known from this specimen, representing approximately 59% of the entire skeleton. Tumor-like bulges and bone detachment can be seen in some of the ribs, and a structure that appears to be an exostosis can be seen in the gastralia. There was also a morphological abnormality in the phalanges of the left foot, and a pathological deformity was confirmed in the right humerus. Bite marks are left on the lower jaw, shoulders, and humerus, and it is assumed that these were wounds sustained by other Tyrannosaurus during its lifetime.

== "Rex Jr.": UCRC PV1 ==
This specimen was excavated in 2001 at Zerbst Ranch, in the Lance Formation of Wyoming. It was found in a sandstone concretion and is articulated and only slightly distorted. It comprises the trunk including the right forelimb and a fragmentary hind limb, and was the first Tyrannosaurus specimen to include an undisputed furcula. In 2025, Paul Sereno and colleagues noted that the original outline of the belly is partially preserved, making the specimen an example of a dinosaur mummy. These researchers suggest that the carcass was buried intact, so that sediment could only slowly enter the body.

== Tyrannosaurus mcraeensis: NMMNH P-3698 ==
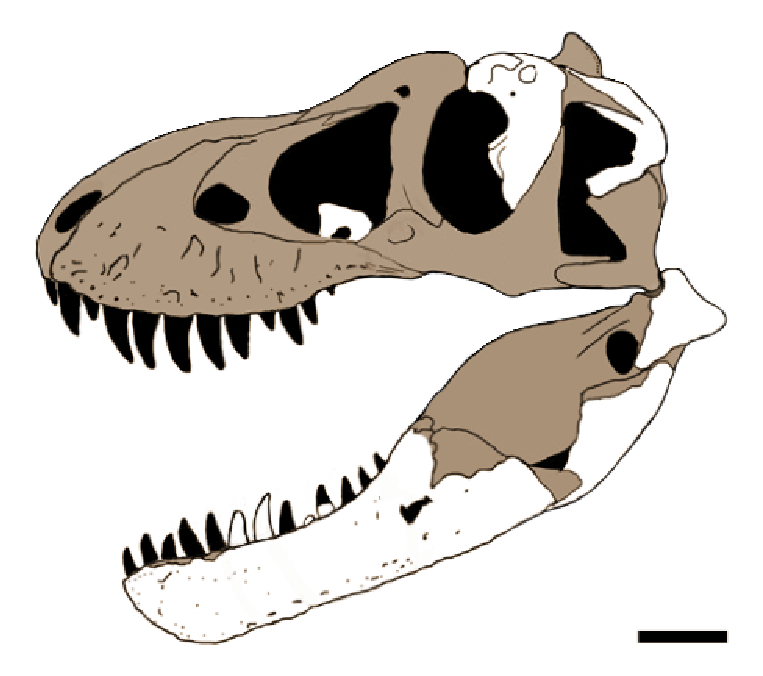
Reconstructed skull of T. mcraeensis indicating the holotype material in white

The remains of a tyrannosaur were discovered in 1983 in the Campanian-early Maastrichtian Hall Lake Formation in New Mexico by Donald Staton and Joe LaPoint. Reposited at the New Mexico Museum of Natural History and Science, the fossil material (NMMNH P-3698) consists of skull and lower jaw bones, in addition to isolated teeth and chevrons. Some of the bones were briefly mentioned in 1984 as belonging to T. rex, and were described in 1986. In 2024, Sebastian G. Dalman and colleagues described this specimen as the holotype of a new Tyrannosaurus species, T. mcraeensis. This species differs from T. rex in having smaller postorbital crests, a proportionately longer and shallower lower jaw with a less prominent chin suggestive of a weaker bite, and more laterally compressed teeth.

== "Gus" ==
"Gus" was excavated on a ranch in Harding County, South Dakota, United States between 2021 and 2023 and was sold at auction at Sothebys, New York, on July 14, 2026, for $50,100,100.

== Formerly assigned specimens ==
=== Nanotyrannus: CMNH 7541 ===
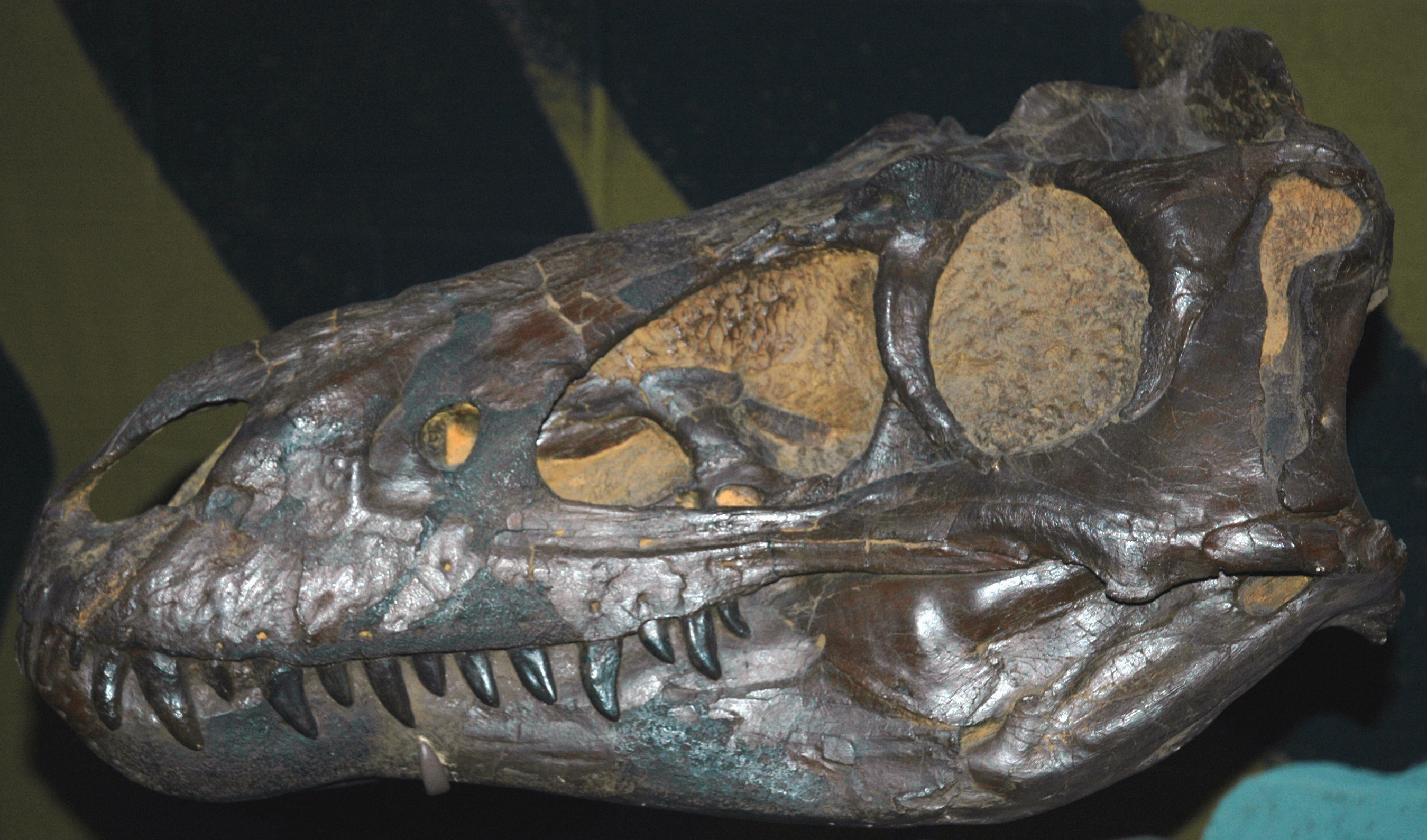
Nanotyrannus holotype

A small but nearly complete skull of Nanotyrannus lancensis, frequently considered to be a juvenile T. rex, was recovered from Montana in 1942. This skull, Cleveland Museum of Natural History (CMNH) 7541, measures 60 centimeters (2.0 ft) in length and was originally classified as a species of Gorgosaurus (G. lancensis) by Charles W. Gilmore in 1946. In 1988, the specimen was re-described by Robert T. Bakker, Phil Currie, and Michael Williams, then the curator of paleontology at the Cleveland Museum of Natural History, where the original specimen was housed and is now on display. Their initial research indicated that the skull bones were fused, and that it therefore represented an adult specimen. In light of this, Bakker and colleagues assigned the skull to a new genus, named Nanotyrannus for its apparently small adult size. The specimen is estimated to have been around 5.2 meters (17 ft) long when it died. However, a detailed analysis of the specimen by Thomas Carr in 1999 suggested that the specimen was a juvenile, leading Carr and many other paleontologists to consider it a juvenile specimen of T. rex. Conversely, in 2025, Christopher T. Griffin and colleagues published the results of a study indicating that histology of hyoid bones could be used to assess the ontogenetic maturity of archosaurs. After sampling the hyoids of the N. lancensis holotype, the researchers concluded that it belongs to a mature individual, and thus a species distinct from Tyrannosaurus rex. They further suggested that other eutyrannosaurs similar in size and morphology to the N. lancensis holotype may be taxonomically distinct from it and T. rex. The current classification of CMNH 7541 is not universal, with more recent research suggesting the specimen belongs to a taxon distinct from Tyrannosaurus.

=== "Jane": BMRP 2002.4.1 ===
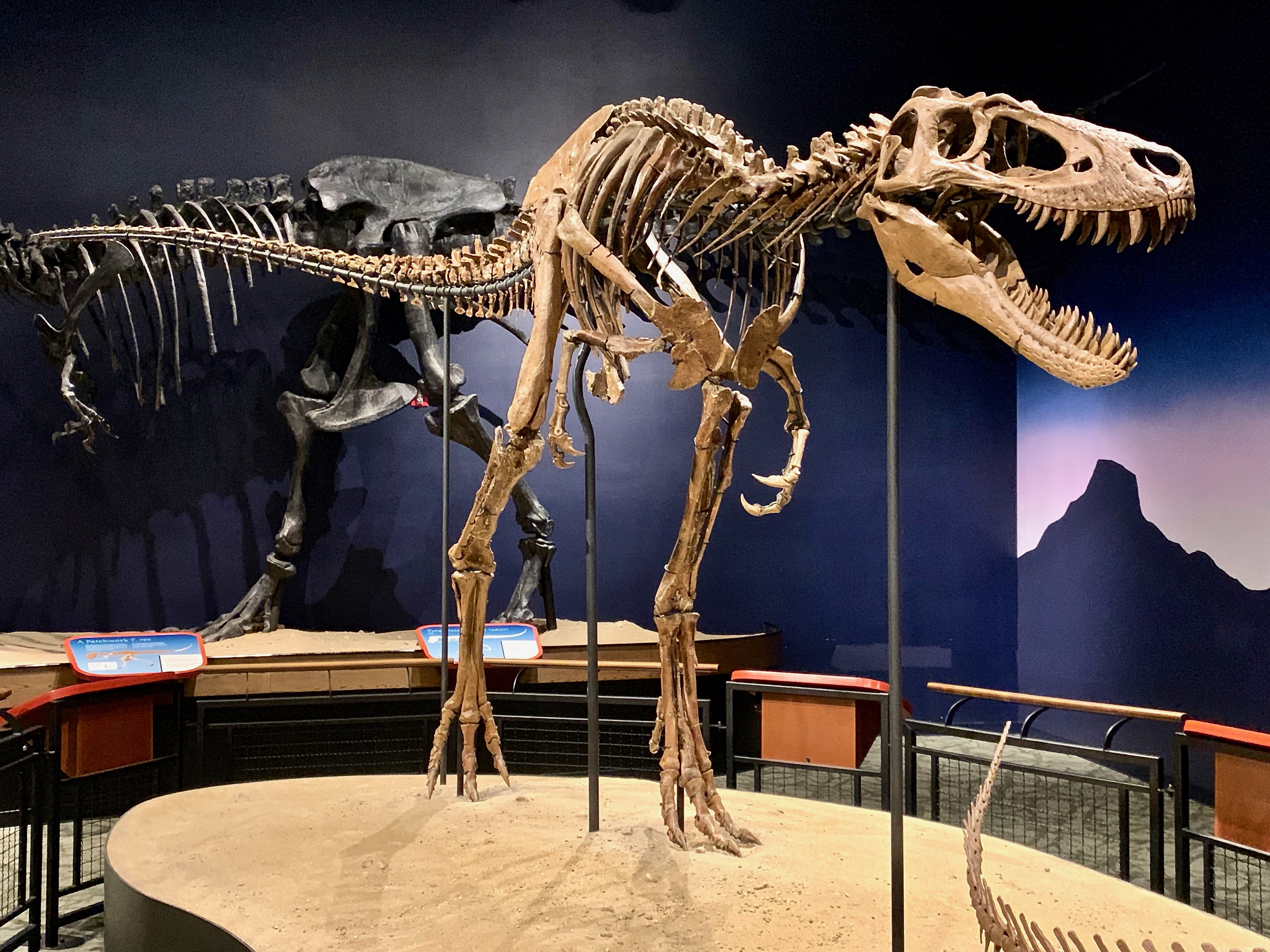
Juvenile Nanotyrannus lethaeus fossil "Jane" displayed at Burpee Museum of Natural History at Rockford, Illinois

Jane is a fossil specimen of small tyrannosauroid dinosaur, officially known as BMRP 2002.4.1, discovered in the Hell Creek Formation in southern Montana in 2001. Despite having a typically female name, Jane's sex is unknown—the specimen was named after Burpee Museum benefactor Jane Solem. The specimen was found in the summer of 2001 by Carol Tuck and Bill Harrison on an expedition led by Burpee Museum curator Michael Henderson. After four years of preparation, Jane was put on display at Rockford, Illinois' Burpee Museum of Natural History as the centerpiece of an exhibit called "Jane: Diary of a Dinosaur."

The Jane specimen has been central to the debate regarding the validity of the proposed tyrannosauroid genus Nanotyrannus. However, the Jane material has yet to be properly studied and described by scientists. Although Larson (2013) saw Jane as more identical to CMNH 7541 and LACM 28471 than to adult T. rex in having a higher tooth count, large pneumatic foramen on the center of the quadratojugal, T-shaped postorbital, and fused shoulder blade and pelvis, Yun (2015) concurred with the opinion of most workers that Nanotyrannus is a juvenile T. rex, noting that a juvenile specimen of Tarbosaurus described by Tsuihiji et al. (2011) also has a T-shaped postorbital. Paleontologists who support the theory that Jane represents a juvenile believe the tyrannosaur was approximately 11 years old at its time of death, and its fully restored skeleton measured 6.5 meters (21 ft) long, a bit more than half as long as the largest-known complete T. rex specimen, nicknamed "Sue," which measures 12.4 m (41 ft) long. According to Hutchinson et al. (2011), the weight of the Jane specimen in life was probably between 639 kg (1,409 lb) and 1,269 kg (2,798 lb), 954 kg (2,103 lb) being the average estimate.

Zanno & Napoli (2025), arguing for the classification of Tyrannosaurus and Nanotyrannus as distinct genera, additionally assigned the Jane specimen to the distinct species of Nanotyrannus, N. lethaeus. In 2026, Woodward, Myhrvold and Horner performed a comprehensive histological analysis of 17 tyrannosaur specimens, and found that the growth trajectories of BMRP 2002.4.1 and BMRP 2006.4.4 do not fit with other Tyrannosaurus specimens in their growth curve model. While they acknowledged the possibility of these ontogenetically immature specimens representing Nanotyrannus as suggested by Zanno and Napoli (2025), they noted that the inconsistencies of these specimens observed in the growth curve do not necessarily bear weight on the proposal that Nanotyrannus is a distinct taxon.

== See also ==
- Timeline of tyrannosaur research
