= Accelerated share repurchase =

Accelerated share repurchase (ASR) refers to a method that publicly traded companies may use to buy back shares of its capital stock from the market.

The ASR method involves the company's buying its shares from an investment bank (which in turn borrows them from its clients) and paying cash to the investment bank while entering into a forward contract. The investment bank will then seek to purchase shares of the company from the market to return to its clients. At the end of the transaction, the company may receive even more shares than it initially received, which are then retired. This method can be contrasted with a typical open market repurchase, where the company simply announces that it is repurchasing shares on the market, and then does so.

A firm might choose the ASR method as a way of reducing the number of shares outstanding for a fixed cost, transferring the risk to the investment bank (which is now short the stock) for a negotiated premium.

By purchasing the shares in this way, it immediately exchanges a fixed amount of money for shares of its stock. It is currently being theorized that such arrangements are used by management to manipulate earnings figures for incentive compensation and reporting reasons. There are also earnings reporting black-out periods during which companies are not allowed to announce repurchasing of stock, so the ASR product from an investment bank could allow a company to essentially buy back shares during a blackout.
