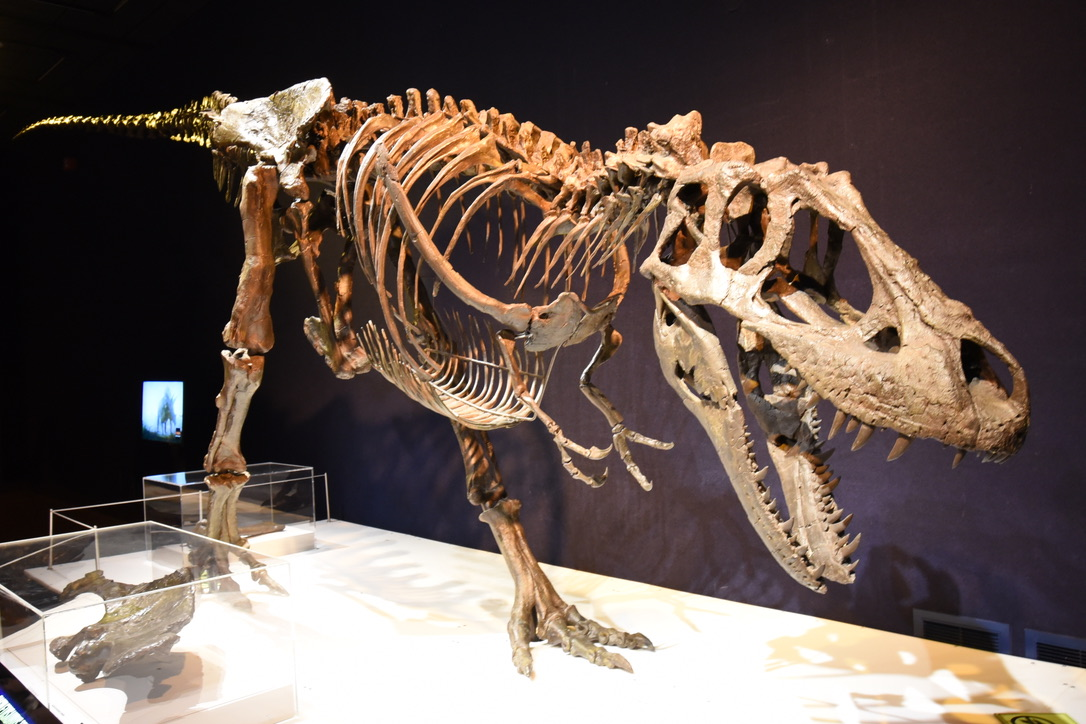
- Cast skeleton mount of D. torosus on display at Milwaukee Public Museum

Scientific classification
- Kingdom: Animalia
- Phylum: Chordata
- Class: Reptilia
- Clade: Dinosauria
- Clade: Saurischia
- Clade: Theropoda
- Superfamily: †Tyrannosauroidea
- Family: †Tyrannosauridae
- Tribe: †Daspletosaurini
- Genus: †Daspletosaurus; Russell, 1970

Type species
- †Daspletosaurus torosus Russell, 1970

Other species
- †D. horneri Carr et al., 2017; †D. degrootorum? Voris et al., 2020; †D. wilsoni? Warshaw & Fowler, 2022

Synonyms
- Thanatotheristes? Voris et al., 2020; Synonyms of D. torosus: Tyrannosaurus torosus (Russell, 1970) Paul, 1987; Tyrannosaurus (Daspletosaurus) torosus (Russell, 1970) sensu Paul, 1988

= Daspletosaurus =

Daspletosaurus Temporal range: Late Cretaceous (Campanian), 79–74.4 Ma

Genus of tyrannosaurid dinosaur from Late Cretaceous period

Daspletosaurus (/dæsˌpliːtəˈsɔːrəs/ das-PLEET-ə-SOR-əs; meaning "frightful lizard") is a genus of tyrannosaurid dinosaur that lived in Laramidia between about 77 and 74.4 million years ago, during the Late Cretaceous period. The genus Daspletosaurus contains three named species. Fossils of the earlier type species, D. torosus, have been found in Alberta, while fossils of a later species, D. horneri, have been found in Montana and Alberta. D. wilsoni has been suggested as an intermediate species between D. torosus and D. horneri that evolved through anagenesis, though further research may be required to definitively support the theory.

There are also multiple specimens which may represent new species of Daspletosaurus from Alberta and Montana, but these have not been formally described. The taxon Thanatotheristes has been suggested to represent a species of Daspletosaurus, D. degrootorum, but this has not been widely supported. Daspletosaurus is closely related to the much larger and more recent tyrannosaurid Tyrannosaurus. Like most tyrannosaurids, Daspletosaurus was a large bipedal predator, with the average adult measuring 8.5–9 m (28–30 ft) and weighing 2–3 metric tons (2.2–3.3 short tons). Daspletosaurus had the small forelimbs typical of tyrannosaurids, although they were proportionately longer than in other genera.

As an apex predator equipped with dozens of large, sharp teeth, Daspletosaurus was at the top of the food chain, probably preying on large dinosaurs like the ceratopsid Centrosaurus and the hadrosaur Hypacrosaurus. In some areas, Daspletosaurus coexisted with another tyrannosaurid, Gorgosaurus, though there is some evidence of niche differentiation between the two. While Daspletosaurus fossils are not as common as other tyrannosaurid fossils, the available specimens allow some analysis of the biology of these animals, including social behavior, diet, and life history.

== Discovery and naming ==
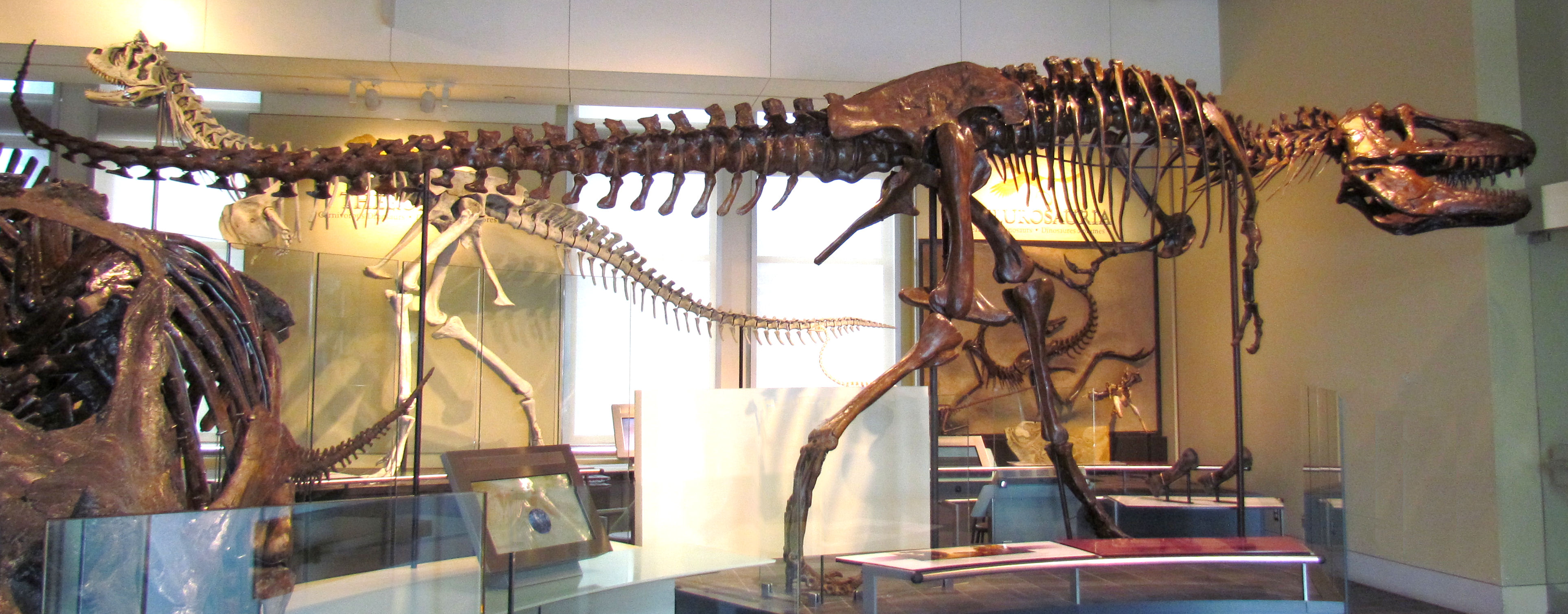
The D. torosus holotype specimen mounted at the Canadian Museum of Nature.

The type specimen of Daspletosaurus torosus (CMN 8506) is a partial skeleton including the skull, the shoulder, a forelimb, the pelvis, a femur, and all of the vertebrae from the neck, torso, and hip, as well as the first eleven tail vertebrae. It was discovered in 1921 near Steveville, Alberta, by Charles Mortram Sternberg, who thought it was a new species of Gorgosaurus. It was not until 1970 that the specimen was fully described by Dale Russell, who made it the type of a new genus, Daspletosaurus, from the Greek δασπλής (dasplēs, stem and connective vowel resulting in dasplēto-) ("frightful") and σαυρος (sauros) ("lizard"). The type species is Daspletosaurus torosus, the specific name torosus being Latin for 'muscular' or 'brawny'. Aside from the type, there is only one other well-known specimen, RTMP 2001.36.1, a relatively complete skeleton discovered in 2001. Both specimens were recovered from the Oldman Formation in the Judith River Group of Alberta. The Oldman Formation was deposited during the middle Campanian stage of the Late Cretaceous, from about 79.5 to 77 Ma (million years ago).

Dale Russell also suggested that a specimen of an immature Albertosaurus (CMN 11315) from the younger Horseshoe Canyon Formation in Alberta actually belonged to a third specimen of Daspletosaurus as D. cf. torosus, extending the temporal range of the genus by approximately 3.5 million years into the Maastrichtian. He based this referral on features of its limb and pelvic girdle, as well as the curvature of the hand claws, which he interpreted as traits matching Daspletosaurus. This reassignment was not universally accepted, and thorough re-examination of the specimen favored its initial referral to Albertosaurus sarcophagus, despite lacking many of the diagnostic skeletal traits used to identify mature tyrannosaurids. An additional maxilla and various teeth from an Edmontosaurus-dominated bonebed in the Horseshoe Canyon Formation was also mistakenly referred to Daspletosaurus, but all the tyrannosaurid material has all since been confirmed to belong to Albertosaurus.

=== Assigned species ===
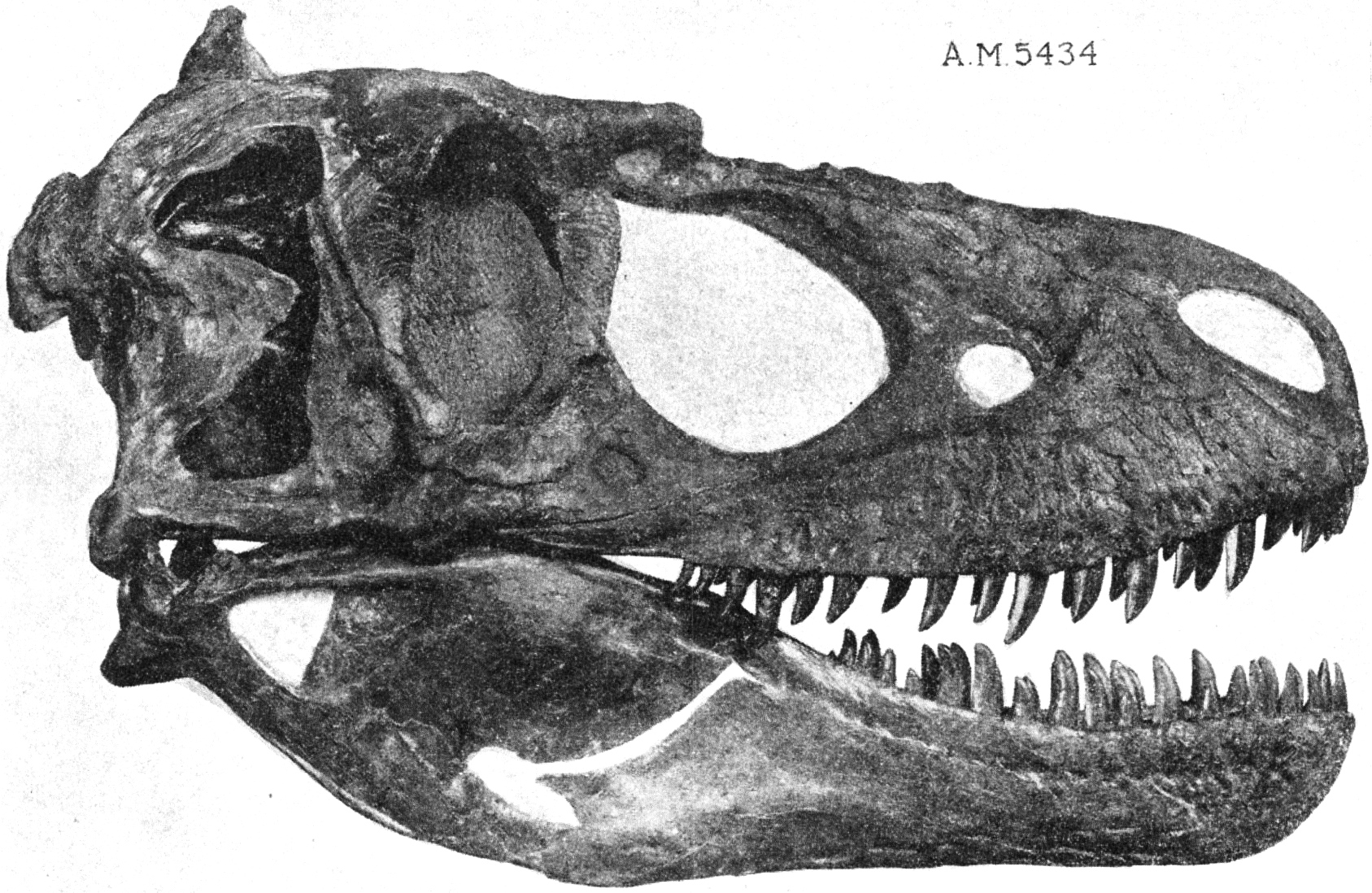
Originally believed to be a specimen of Gorgosaurus, this skull was later sold to the Field Museum and is now reassigned to Daspletosaurus torosus

Over the years, various additional species have been assigned to the genus Daspletosaurus. Though some have been designated as Daspletosaurus spp, this does not imply that they all represent the same species.

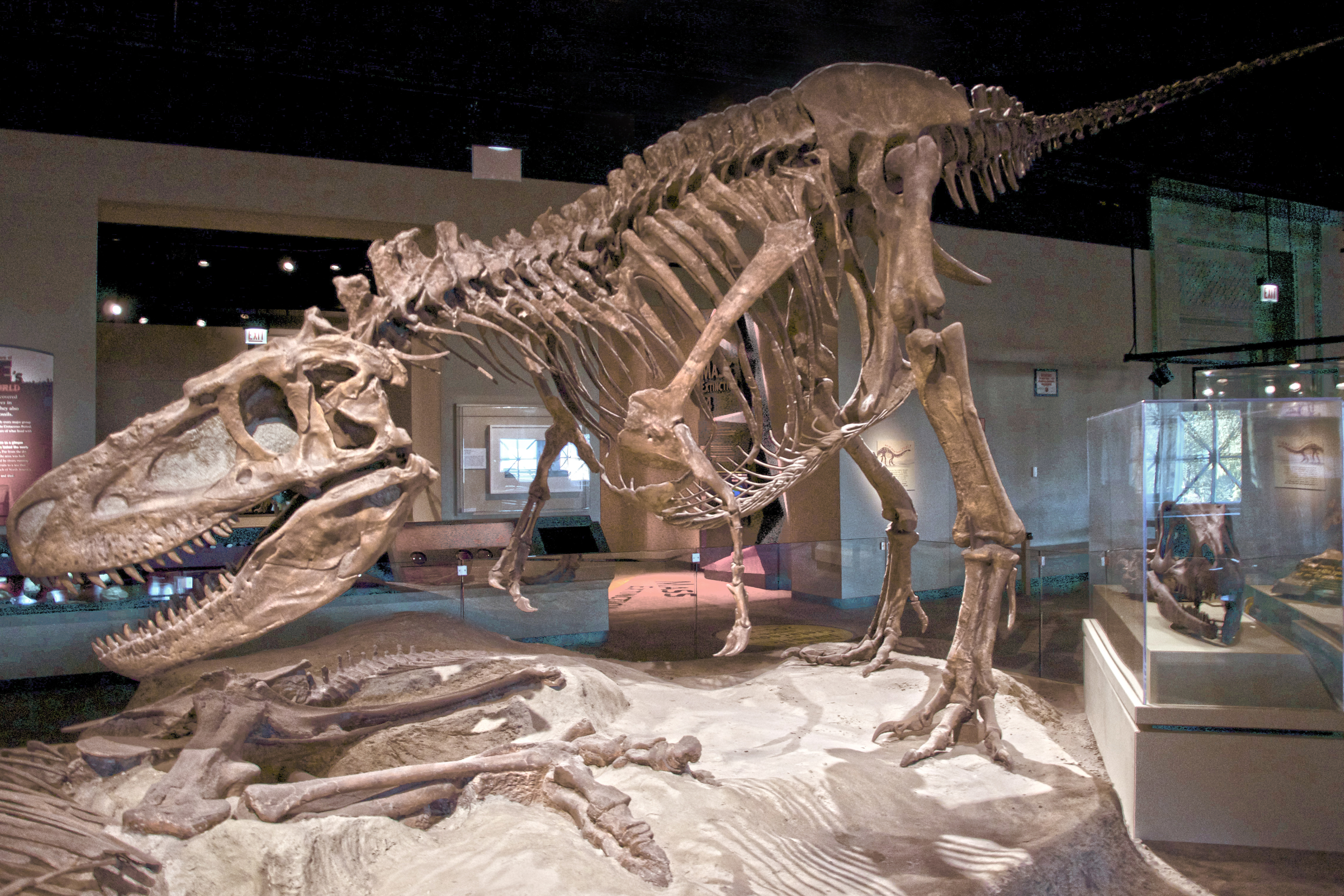
Dinosaur Park specimen (FMNH PR308), nicknamed "Gorgeous George", mounted at the Field Museum

Along with the holotype, Russell designated a specimen collected by Barnum Brown in 1913 as the paratype of D. torosus. This specimen (AMNH 5438) consists of parts of the hindleg, the pelvis, and some of its associated vertebrae. It was discovered in the Dinosaur Park Formation in Alberta. The Dinosaur Park Formation was formerly known as the Upper Oldman Formation and dates back to the middle Campanian, between 76.5 and 74.8 million years ago. Daspletosaurus fossils are known specifically from the middle to upper section of the formation, between 75.6 and 75.0 million years ago. In 1914, Brown collected a nearly complete skeleton and skull; forty years later his American Museum of Natural History sold this specimen to the Field Museum of Natural History in Chicago. It was mounted for display in Chicago and labeled as Albertosaurus libratus for many years, but after several skull features were later found to be modeled in plaster, including most of the teeth, the specimen (FMNH PR308) was reassigned to Daspletosaurus torosus by Thomas Carr in 1999. A total of eight specimens have been collected from the Dinosaur Park Formation over the years since, most of them within the boundaries of Dinosaur Provincial Park. Phil Currie believes that the Dinosaur Park specimens represent a new species of Daspletosaurus, distinguished by certain features of the skull. Pictures of this new species have been published, but it still awaits a name and full description in print. In 2024, Warshaw and colleagues suggested that the Dinosaur Park specimens likely belong to D. wilsoni. In 2025, Coppock and colleagues referred the Dinosaur Park Formation specimen CMN 350, a partial skull and skeleton with left dentary (TMP 2010.121.0001), to D. horneri.

A new tyrannosaurid specimen (OMNH 10131), including skull fragments, ribs, and parts of the hindlimb, was reported from New Mexico in 1990 and assigned to the now-defunct genus Aublysodon. Many later authors have reassigned this specimen, along with a few others from New Mexico, to yet another unnamed species of Daspletosaurus. However, research published in 2010 showed that this species, from the Hunter Wash Member of the Kirtland Formation, is actually a more primitive tyrannosauroid, and was classified in the genus Bistahieversor.

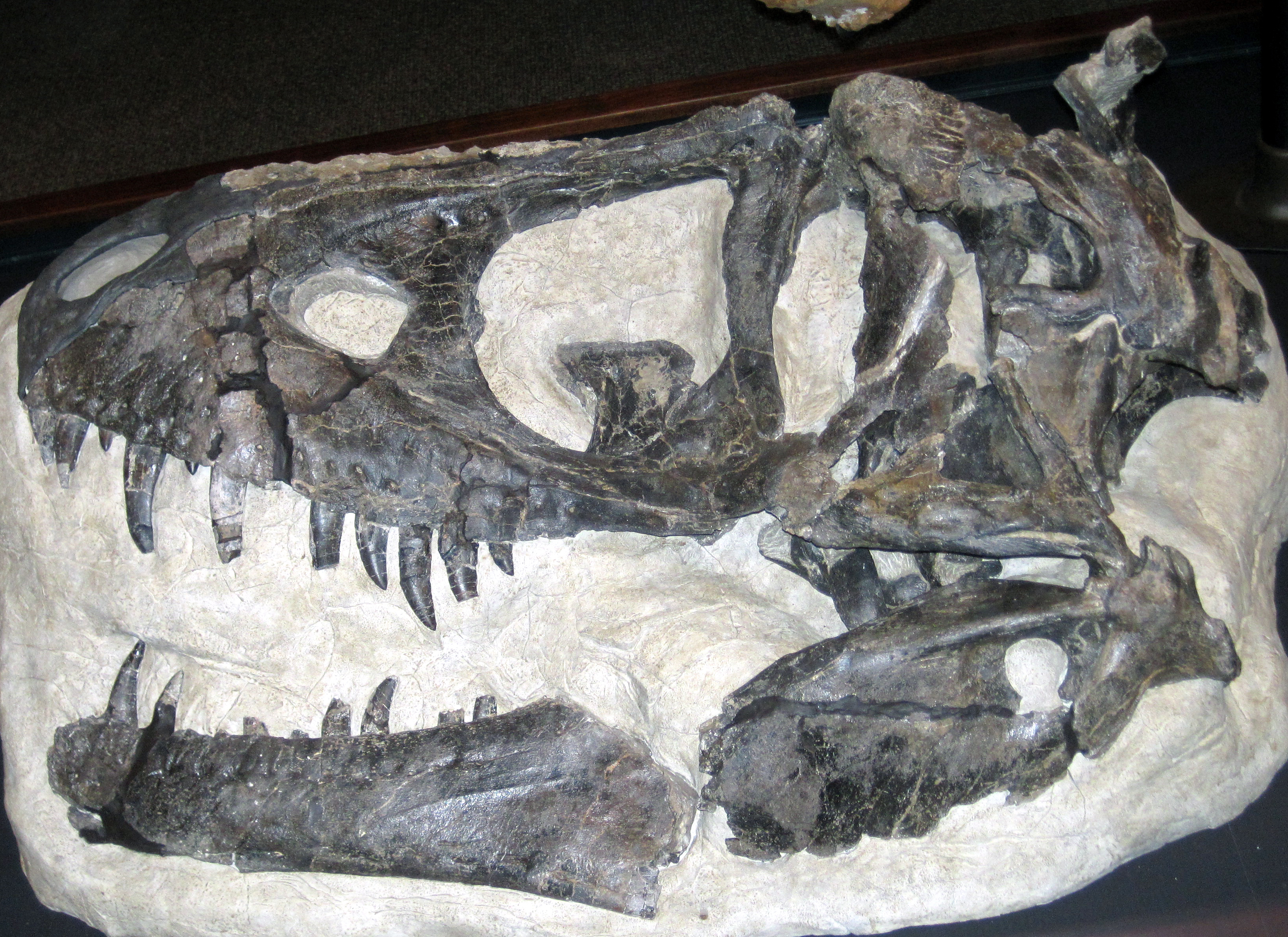
D. horneri holotype skull from Montana in Museum of the Rockies

In 1992, Jack Horner and colleagues published an extremely preliminary report of a tyrannosaurid from the upper parts of the Campanian Two Medicine Formation in Montana, which was interpreted as a transitional species between Daspletosaurus and the later Tyrannosaurus. Currie (2003) stated that the tyrannosaurid from the Two Medicine Formation mentioned by Horner et al. (1992) may be an unnamed third species of Daspletosaurus. Another partial skeleton was reported from the Upper Two Medicine in 2001, preserving the remains of a juvenile hadrosaur in its abdominal cavity. This specimen was assigned to Daspletosaurus but not to any particular species. The remains of at least three more Daspletosaurus have also been described in a Two Medicine bonebed by Currie et al. (2005); the authors stated that this fossil material likely represents then-unnamed species mentioned by Horner et al. (1992), but cautioned that further study and description of Daspletosaurus would be necessary before the species can be determined with certainty. In 2017, the Two Medicine Formation taxon was named as the new species D. horneri.

Isolated tyrannosaurid teeth in the upper portions of the Judith River Formation are likely from Gorgosaurus as well as some species of Daspletosaurus, probably D. torosus. In 2009, preliminary preparation of a Daspletosaurus specimen from the Coal Ridge Member of the Judith River Formation measuring about 11 metres (36 ft) long was reported. Some researchers assigned this specimen to D. torosus, while others considered it to be a distinct species yet to be named, referred to as D. sp. In 2025, formal description of the specimen led by Ethan Warner-Cowgill concurred with the latter opinion. In the lower portion of the Judith River Formation, around 78 million years ago, there is some evidence for a new undescribed tyrannosaurid taxon. A specimen in the collections of Triebold Paleontology excavated between 2002 and 2004, known as "Sir William" (RMDRC 2002.MT-001), shows some characteristics of Daspletosaurus suggesting a new earlier species to the genus. However, the specimen shows many characteristics typical of early tyrannosaurines such as Teratophoneus and even some of the later Tyrannosaurus, which may suggest an entirely new genus.

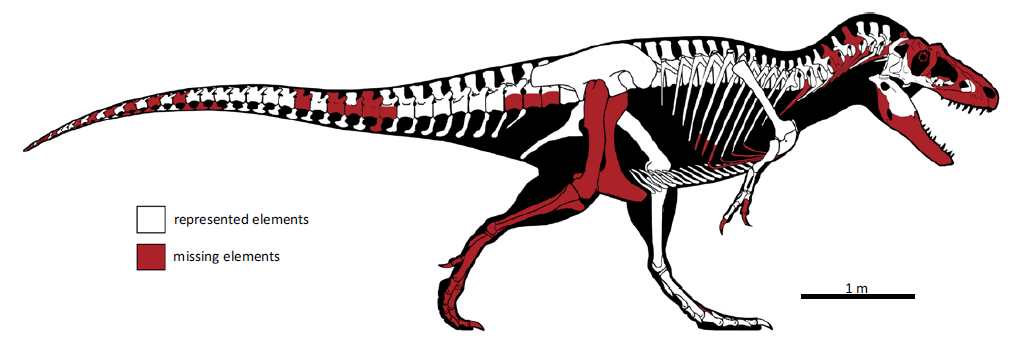
Skeletal reconstruction of Daspletosaurus sp. (specimen CMC VP15826)

In 2017, John Wilson discovered the bones of a tyrannosaurid, including a partial disarticulated skull, cervical, sacral, and caudal vertebrae, and a rib, chevron, and first metatarsal, from the "Jack's B2" site of the Judith River Formation. Elías A. Warshaw and Denver W. Fowler described these remains (BDM 107) in 2022 as belonging to a new species of Daspletosaurus, D. wilsoni. It represents a transitional species between D. torosus and D. horneri, as it existed between them in time. It has been suggested that the three species may have evolved directly through anagenesis, but this theory was disputed by Scherer and Voiculescu-Holvad (2024) who suggested that D. wilsoni may be a junior synonym of D. torosus, while Warshaw et al. (2024) supported the validity of this species and referred other specimens to it. In 2025, Scherer also supported the theory that tyrannosaurines including Daspletosaurus evolved through anagenesis, and accepted the validity of D. wilsoni. In 2025, Warner-Cowgill and colleagues described the largest known specimen of Daspletosaurus, CMC VP 15826 (nicknamed "Pete III"), identifying new anatomical features previously unknown from this genus and interpreting these characters as weakening the hypothesis that D. wilsoni and D. torosus are distinct species. In their 2025 description of the tyrannosauroid Khankhuuluu, Voris and colleagues agreed that the characters distinguishing these species were problematic and unconvincing.

== Description ==
Size of D. wilsoni, D. torosus, and D. horneri compared to a human

While very large by the standard of modern predators, Daspletosaurus was not the largest tyrannosaurid. Adults could reach a length of 8.5–9 metres (28–30 ft) from snout to tail, a hip height of 2.2 metres (7.2 ft), and a body mass of 2–3 metric tons (2.2–3.3 short tons). However, one large specimen of Daspletosaurus sp. (CMC VP 15826) suggests that the genus could reach lengths of over 9 metres (30 ft), potentially reaching sizes of 11 metres (36 ft) in length and 4–5 metric tons (4.4–5.5 short tons) in weight.

=== Skull ===
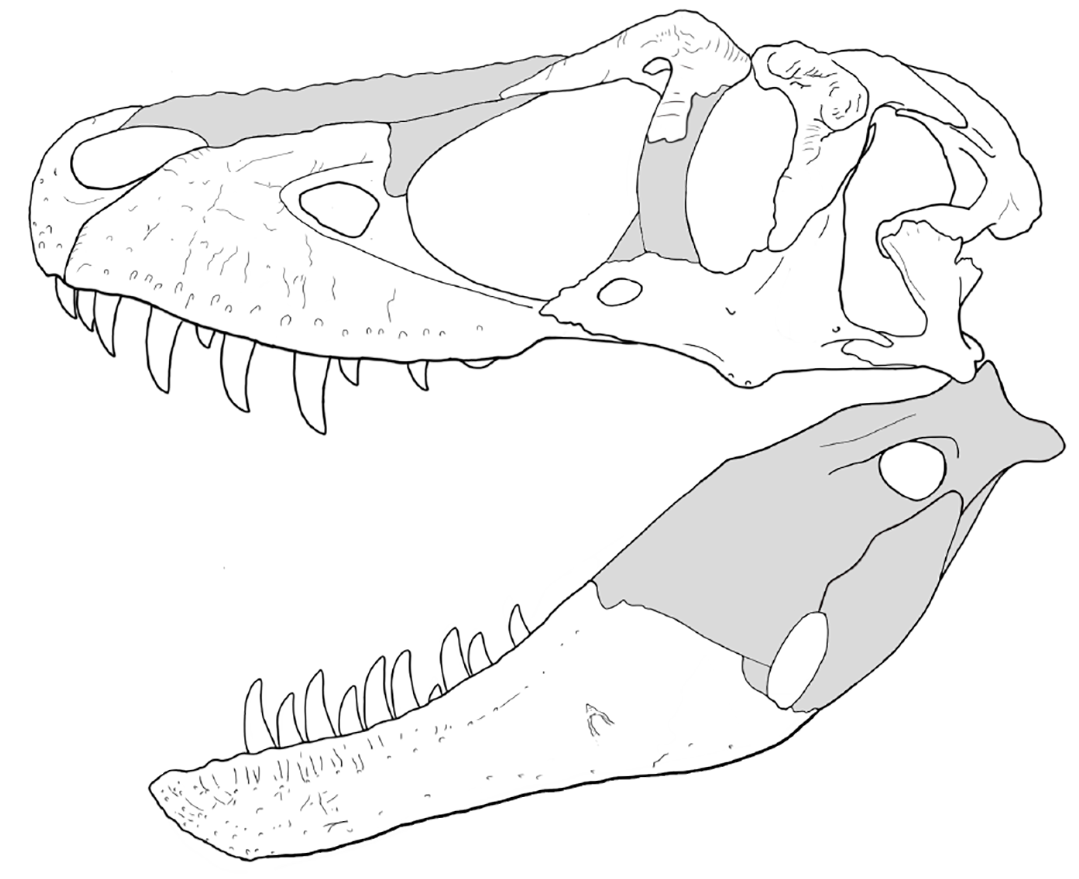
Skull of Daspletosaurus wilsoni

Daspletosaurus had a massive skull that could reach more than 1 metre (3 ft 3 in) in length. The bones were heavily constructed and some, including the nasal bones on top of the snout, were fused for strength. Large fenestrae (openings) in the skull reduced its weight. An adult Daspletosaurus was armed with about six dozen teeth that were very long but oval in cross section rather than blade-like. Unlike its other teeth, those in the premaxilla at the end of the upper jaw had a D-shaped cross section, an example of heterodonty always seen in tyrannosaurids. Unique skull features included the rough outer surface of the maxilla (upper jaw bone) and the pronounced crests around the eyes on the lacrimal, postorbital, and jugal bones. The orbit (eye socket) was a tall oval, somewhere in between the circular shape seen in Gorgosaurus and the 'keyhole' shape of Tyrannosaurus. Split carinae (edges) have been found on Daspletosaurus teeth.

=== Postcranial skeleton ===
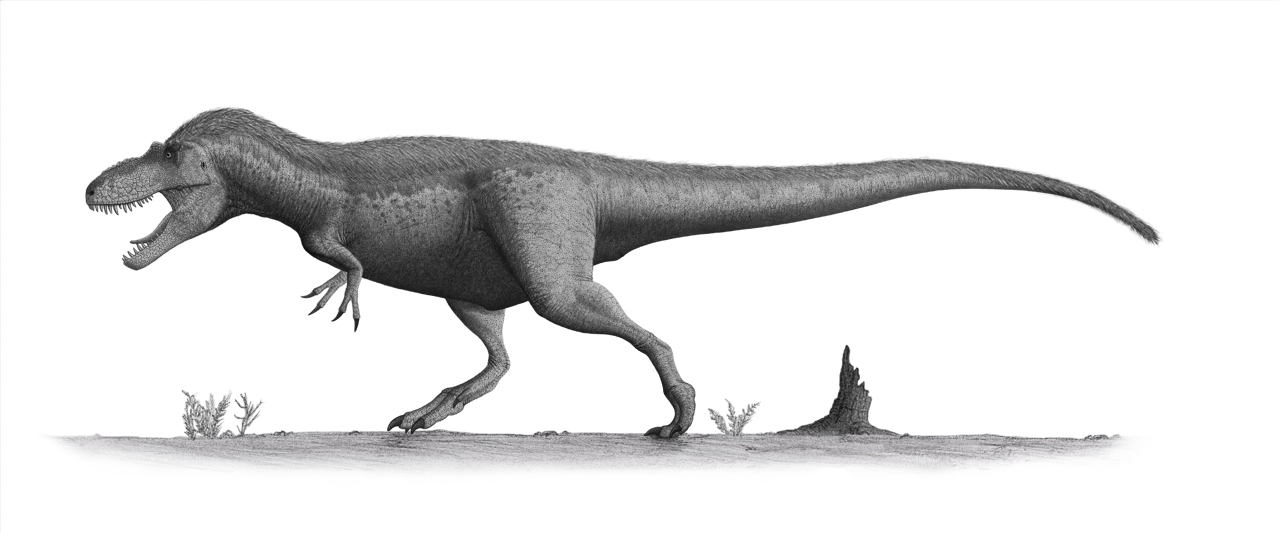
Restoration of D. torosus

Daspletosaurus shared the same body form as other tyrannosaurids, with a short, S-shaped neck supporting the massive skull. It walked on its two thick hindlimbs, which ended in four-toed feet, although the first digit (the hallux) did not contact the ground. In contrast, the forelimbs were extremely small and bore only two digits, although Daspletosaurus had the longest forelimbs in proportion to body size of any tyrannosaurid. A long, heavy tail served as a counterweight to the head and torso, with the center of gravity over the hips.

=== Soft tissue reconstruction ===
From a comparison of the degree of wear of teeth of Daspletosaurus with other extinct and extant animals, it is concluded that Daspletosaurus, as well as other non-avian theropods, had lips that protected the teeth from external influences. Due to this feature, the snout of Daspletosaurus more closely resembled lizards than crocodiles, which lack lips.

A skin impression from Daspletosaurus torosus has been described, showing small polygonal scales measuring 3 mm in diameter. The placement of the scales on the body is not known.

== Classification and systematics ==
Daspletosaurus belongs in the subfamily Tyrannosaurinae within the family Tyrannosauridae, along with Tarbosaurus, Tyrannosaurus, and Alioramini. Animals in this subfamily are more closely related to Tyrannosaurus than to Albertosaurus and are known – with the exception of Alioramus – for their robust build with proportionally larger skulls and longer femora than in the other subfamily, the Albertosaurinae. It further belongs to the tribe Daspletosaurini, consisting of it and the taxon Thanatotheristes.

Daspletosaurus is usually considered to be closely related to Tyrannosaurus, or even a direct ancestor through anagenesis. Gregory Paul reassigned D. torosus to the genus Tyrannosaurus, creating the new combination Tyrannosaurus torosus, but this has not been generally accepted. Many researchers believe Tarbosaurus and Tyrannosaurus to be sister taxa or even to be the same genus, with Daspletosaurus a more basal relative. On the other hand, Phil Currie and colleagues find Daspletosaurus to be more closely related to Tarbosaurus and other Asian tyrannosaurids like Alioramus than to the North American Tyrannosaurus. The systematics (evolutionary relationships) of Daspletosaurus have become clearer as new species have been described.

Below is a cladogram of Tyrannosaurinae based on the phylogenetic analysis conducted by Warshaw & Fowler (2022). Here, it is proposed that the three Daspletosaurus species evolved through anagenesis in the Tyrannosaurinae in a line leading to Zhuchengtyrannus, Tarbosaurus, and Tyrannosaurus. Due to their more fragmentary nature, Thanatotheristes and Nanuqsaurus were excluded from this analysis.

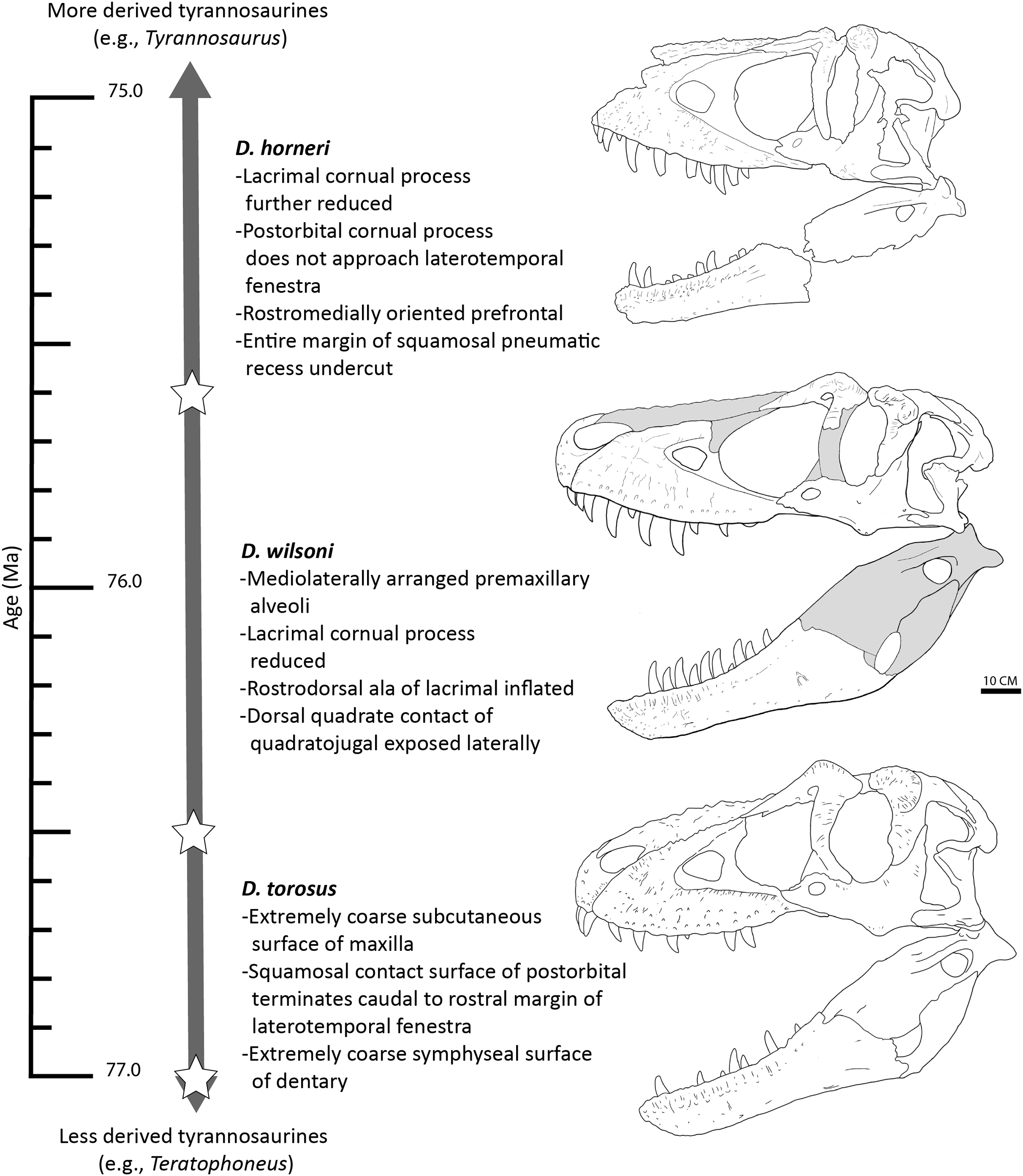
Proposed anagenetic transition of Daspletosaurus species

- Tyrannosaurinae
  - - Alioramus remotus
    - - Alioramus altai
      - Qianzhousaurus
  - - - Dynamoterror
      - - Teratophoneus
        - Lythronax
    - - Daspletosaurus torosus
      - - Daspletosaurus wilsoni
        - - Daspletosaurus horneri
          - - Zhuchengtyrannus
            - - Tarbosaurus
              - Tyrannosaurus

In 2024, Scherer and Voiculescu-Holvad argued that the stratigraphic ranges of D. torosus, D. wilsoni and an unnamed species from the Dinosaur Park Formation and Oldman Formation show a clear overlap, indicating that anagenesis may not be the predominant factor of speciation within the genus, since all species of Daspletosaurus were contemporaneous with each other at some point during its evolution. Phylogenetic analyzes resolved D. horneri as the most basal species, in spite of being the youngest species stratigraphically. While the authors did not completely refute the possibility that anagenesis was the main driver of Daspletosaurus evolution based on the intermediate morphological features, they also suggested that D. wilsoni may be a junior synonym of D. torosus, since there is a near lack of autapomorphic characters that can differentiate this species. They also claimed that Daspletosaurus did not evolve from Thanatotheristes, since they found no support on the basis of morphological and stratigraphical data, and that anagenesis will not be supported unequivocally due to the limited sample and nature of the fossil record, which does not show a great degree of variation in morphology. The cladogram presented for their phylogenetic analysis is shown below.

- Tyrannosaurinae
  - Alioramini
    - Alioramus remotus
    - - Alioramus altai
      - Qianzhousaurus
  - - Teratophoneini
      - - Lythronax
        - Teratophoneus
      - Dynamoterror
    - - Daspletosaurini
        - Thanatotheristes
        - - Daspletosaurus horneri
          - - Daspletosaurus wilsoni
            - - Daspletosaurus torosus
              - Dinosaur Park and Oldman formations taxon (TMP 2001.36.1)
      - Tyrannosaurini
        - Zhuchengtyrannus
        - - Tarbosaurus
          - Tyrannosaurus

In the same year, Warshaw and colleagues supported the anagenesis theory by referring other specimens to D. wilsoni (including the Dinosaur Park specimen) which they considered as a valid taxon, and by reanalysing the previous study of Scherer and Voiculescu-Holvad (2024). They claimed that the known species of Daspletosaurus show a gradient of morphologies consistent with them representing a series of ancestors and descendants. They also argued that there is no stratigraphic overlap between D. torosus and D. wilsoni, since a large specimen (CMC VP 15826) previously referred to as D. torosus is from a strata recently dated to be later than D. wilsoni, and since this specimen likely belongs to a distinct species of Daspletosaurus yet to be named. They also recovered the paraphyletic Daspletosaurus at the base of Tyrannosaurini, making the genus ancestral to Tyrannosaurus.

In 2025, contrary to his initial skepticism, Scherer supported the theory that Daspletosaurus evolved through anagenesis based on his reevaulation of the evidence for anagenesis and cladogenesis in tyrannosaurines. He recovered the genus Daspletosaurus as paraphyletic, forming an evolutionary grade within Tyrannosaurinae, but not as a direct ancestor of Tyrannosaurini based on the fragmentary tyrannosaurine specimens probably from the Campanian age, including Tyrannosaurus mcraeensis, which bear strong similarities to Tyrannosaurus.

== Paleobiology ==
=== Senses ===
There are indications of D. horneri possessing integumentary sensory organs, possibly used in touch, modulation of precise jaw movements, temperature reading, and prey detection. The large flat scales may have further protected the snout during prey capture and intra-specific combat.

=== Social behavior ===
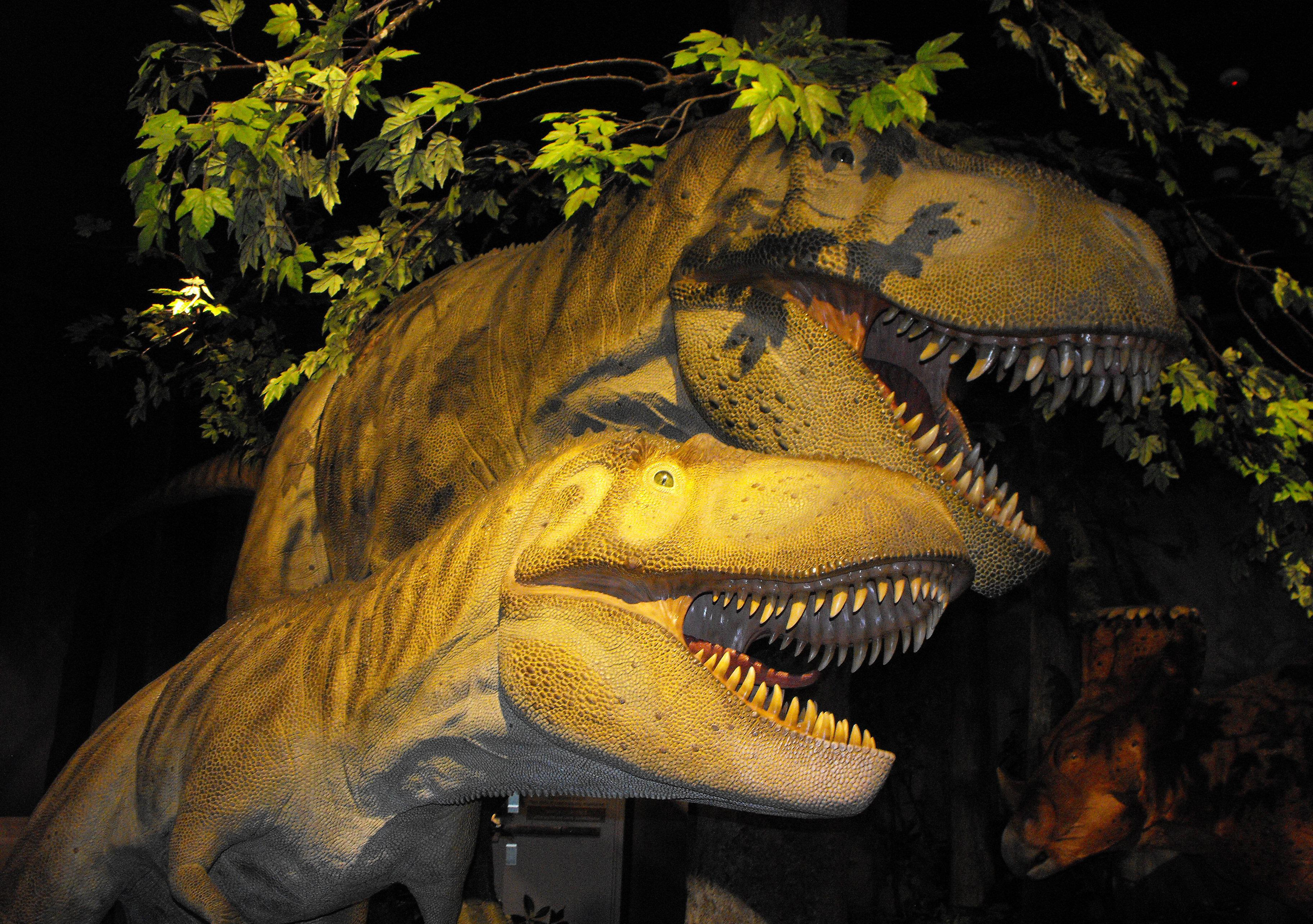
Two D. torosus models in the Canadian Museum of Nature

A full-grown Dinosaur Park Daspletosaurus (TMP 85.62.1) exhibits tyrannosaur bite marks on its skull. While it is possible that the bites were attributable to other species, intraspecific aggression such as facial biting is very common among predators. Facial bites are seen in other tyrannosaurs like Gorgosaurus and Tyrannosaurus, as well as in other theropod genera like Sinraptor and Saurornitholestes. Darren Tanke and Phil Currie hypothesize that the bites are due to intraspecific competition for territory or resources, or for dominance within a social group. A young specimen of the tyrannosaurid (TMP 1994.143.1), initially identified as the Dinosaur Park Daspletosaurus but subsequently referred to Gorgosaurus libratus, also shows bite marks on the face that were inflicted by another tyrannosaur. The bite marks are healed over, indicating that the animal survived the bite.

Evidence that Daspletosaurus lived in social groups comes from a bonebed found in the Two Medicine Formation of Montana. The bonebed includes the remains of three Daspletosaurus, including a large adult, a small juvenile, and another individual of intermediate size. At least five hadrosaurs are preserved at the same location. Geologic evidence indicates that the remains were not brought together by river currents but that all of the animals were buried simultaneously at the same location. The hadrosaur remains are scattered and bear numerous marks from tyrannosaur teeth, indicating that the Daspletosaurus were feeding on the hadrosaurs at the time of death. The cause of death is unknown. Currie speculates that the daspletosaurs formed a pack, although this cannot be stated with certainty. Other scientists are skeptical of the evidence for social groups in Daspletosaurus and other large theropods;

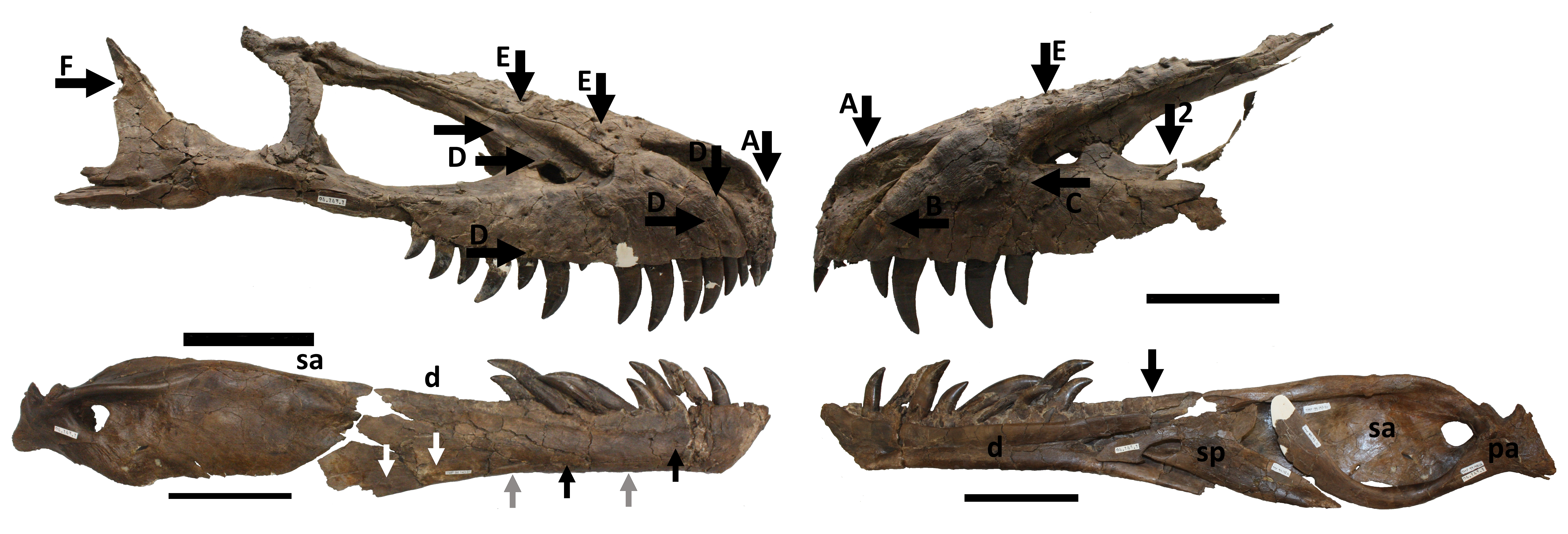
Juvenile Gorgosaurus libratus skull TMP 1994.143.1 from the Dinosaur Park Formation, previously assigned to Daspletosaurus sp., with several bite marks by other tyrannosaurs

Brian Roach and Daniel Brinkman have suggested that Daspletosaurus social interaction would have more closely resembled the modern Komodo dragon, where non-cooperative individuals mob carcasses, frequently attacking and even cannibalizing each other in the process.

Fossils of other tyrannosaurids like Teratophoneus and Albertosaurus among other genera suggest that gregarious behavior may have been widespread in tyrannosaurs and thus may vindicate the hypothesis of Daspletosaurus being a social animal, as bonebeds of these genera containing multiple specimens in a wide range of ages have been excavated and described from these different genera.

Evidence of cannibalism in Daspletosaurus was published in 2015.

=== Life history ===
A graph showing the hypothesized growth curves (body mass versus age) of four tyrannosaurids. Daspletosaurus is shown in green, based on Erickson et al., 2004

Paleontologist Gregory Erickson and colleagues have studied the growth and life history of tyrannosaurids. Analysis of bone histology can determine the age of a specimen when it died. Growth rates can be examined when the ages of various individuals are plotted against their size on a graph. Erickson has shown that after a long time as juveniles, tyrannosaurs underwent tremendous growth spurts for about four years midway through their lives. After the rapid growth phase ended with sexual maturity, growth slowed down considerably in adult animals. Erickson only examined Daspletosaurus from the Dinosaur Park Formation, but these specimens show the same pattern. Compared to albertosaurines, Daspletosaurus showed a faster growth rate during the rapid growth period due to its higher adult weight. The maximum growth rate in Daspletosaurus was 180 kilograms (400 lb) per year, based on a mass estimate of 1,800 kilograms (2.0 short tons) in adults. Other authors have suggested higher adult weights for Daspletosaurus; this would change the magnitude of the growth rate but not the overall pattern.

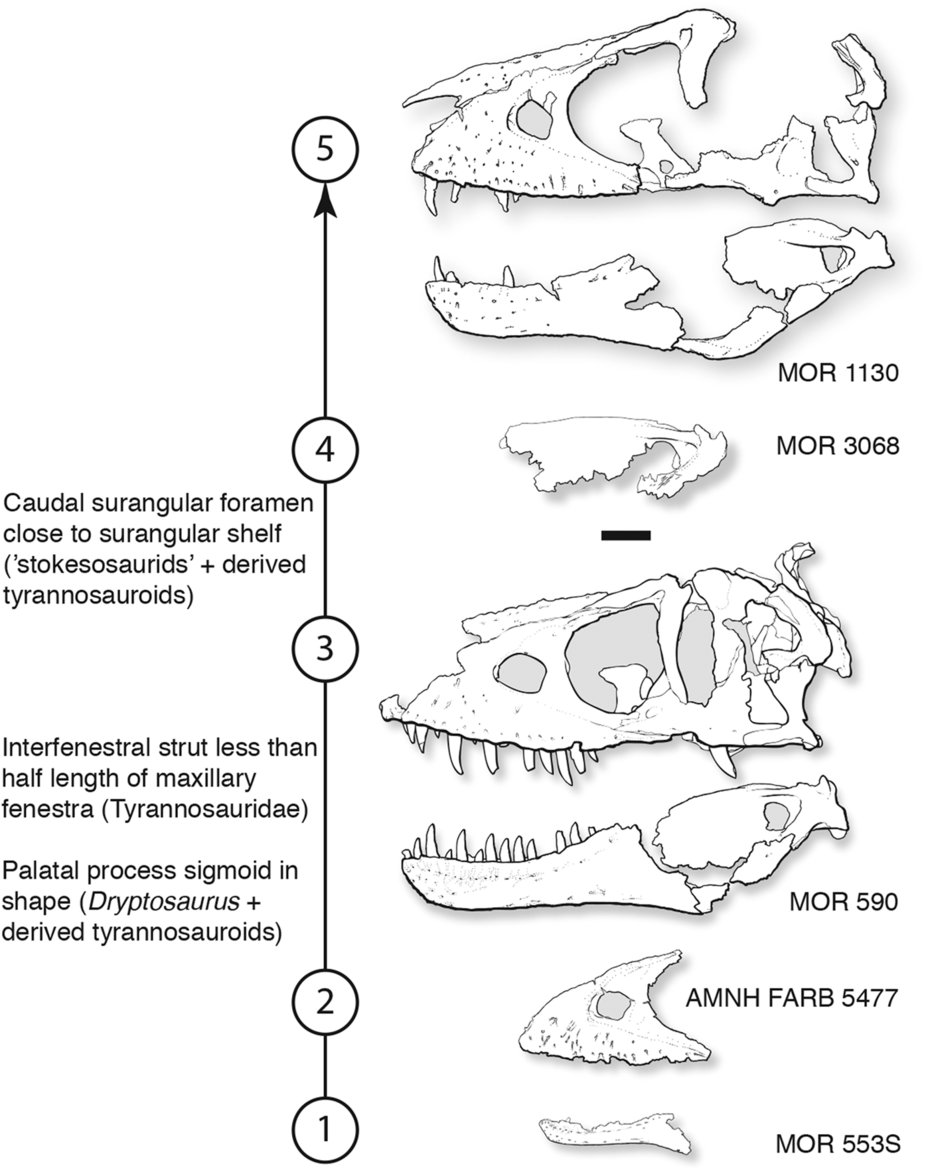
Growth series of D. horneri

By tabulating the number of specimens of each age group, Erickson and his colleagues were able to draw conclusions about life history in a population of Albertosaurus. Their analysis showed that, while juveniles were rare in the fossil record, subadults in the rapid growth phase and adults were far more common. While this could be due to preservation or collection biases, Erickson hypothesized that the difference was due to low mortality among juveniles over a certain size, which is also seen in some modern large mammals like elephants. This low mortality may have resulted from a lack of predation, since tyrannosaurs surpassed all contemporaneous predators in size by the age of two. Paleontologists have not found enough Daspletosaurus remains for a similar analysis, but Erickson notes that the same general trend seems to apply.

A 2009 study found evidence of Trichomonas gallinae-like infection in the jaws of various specimens of Daspletosaurus.

== Paleoecology ==
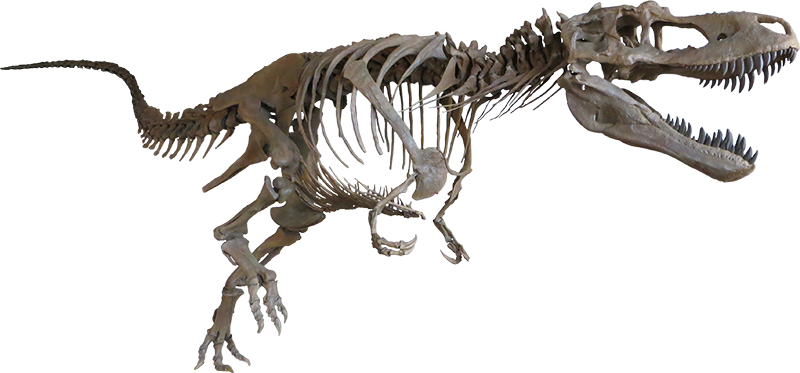
D. torosus skeleton cast in the Rocky Mountain Dinosaur Resource Center based on a nearly complete specimen from Montana's Judith River Formation.

All known Daspletosaurus fossils have been found in formations dating to the middle to late Campanian stage of the Late Cretaceous Period, between 78 and 74.4 million years ago. Since the middle of the Cretaceous, North America had been divided in half by the Western Interior Seaway, with much of Montana and Alberta below the surface. However, the uplift of the Rocky Mountains in the Laramide Orogeny to the west, which began during the time of Daspletosaurus, forced the seaway to retreat eastwards and southwards. Rivers flowed down from the mountains and drained into the seaway, carrying sediment along with them that formed the Two Medicine Formation, the Judith River Group, and other sedimentary formations in the region. About 73 million years ago, the seaway began to advance westwards and northwards again, and the entire region was covered by the Bearpaw Sea, represented throughout the western United States and Canada by the massive Bearpaw Shale.

Daspletosaurus lived in a vast floodplain along the western shore of the interior seaway. Large rivers watered the land, occasionally flooding and blanketing the region with new sediment. When water was plentiful, the region could support a great deal of plant and animal life, but periodic droughts also struck the region, resulting in mass mortality as preserved in the many bonebed deposits found in Two Medicine and Judith River sediments, including the Daspletosaurus bonebed. Similar conditions exist today in East Africa. Volcanic eruptions from the west periodically blanketed the region with ash, also resulting in large-scale mortality, while simultaneously enriching the soil for future plant growth. It is these ash beds that allow precise radiometric dating as well. Fluctuating sea levels also resulted in a variety of other environments at different times and places within the Judith River Group, including offshore and nearshore marine habitats, coastal wetlands, deltas, and lagoons, in addition to the inland floodplains. The Two Medicine Formation was deposited at higher elevations farther inland than the other two formations.

The excellent vertebrate fossil record of Two Medicine and Judith River rocks resulted from a combination of abundant animal life, periodic natural disasters, and the deposition of large amounts of sediment. Many types of freshwater and estuarine fish are represented, including sharks, rays, sturgeons, gars, and others. The Judith River Group preserves the remains of many aquatic amphibians and reptiles, including frogs, salamanders, turtles, Champsosaurus and crocodilians. Terrestrial lizards, including whiptails, skinks, monitors, and alligator lizards have also been discovered. Azhdarchid pterosaurs, and birds like Apatornis and Avisaurus flew overhead, while several varieties of mammals coexisted with Daspletosaurus and other types of dinosaurs in the various formations that make up the Judith River wedge.

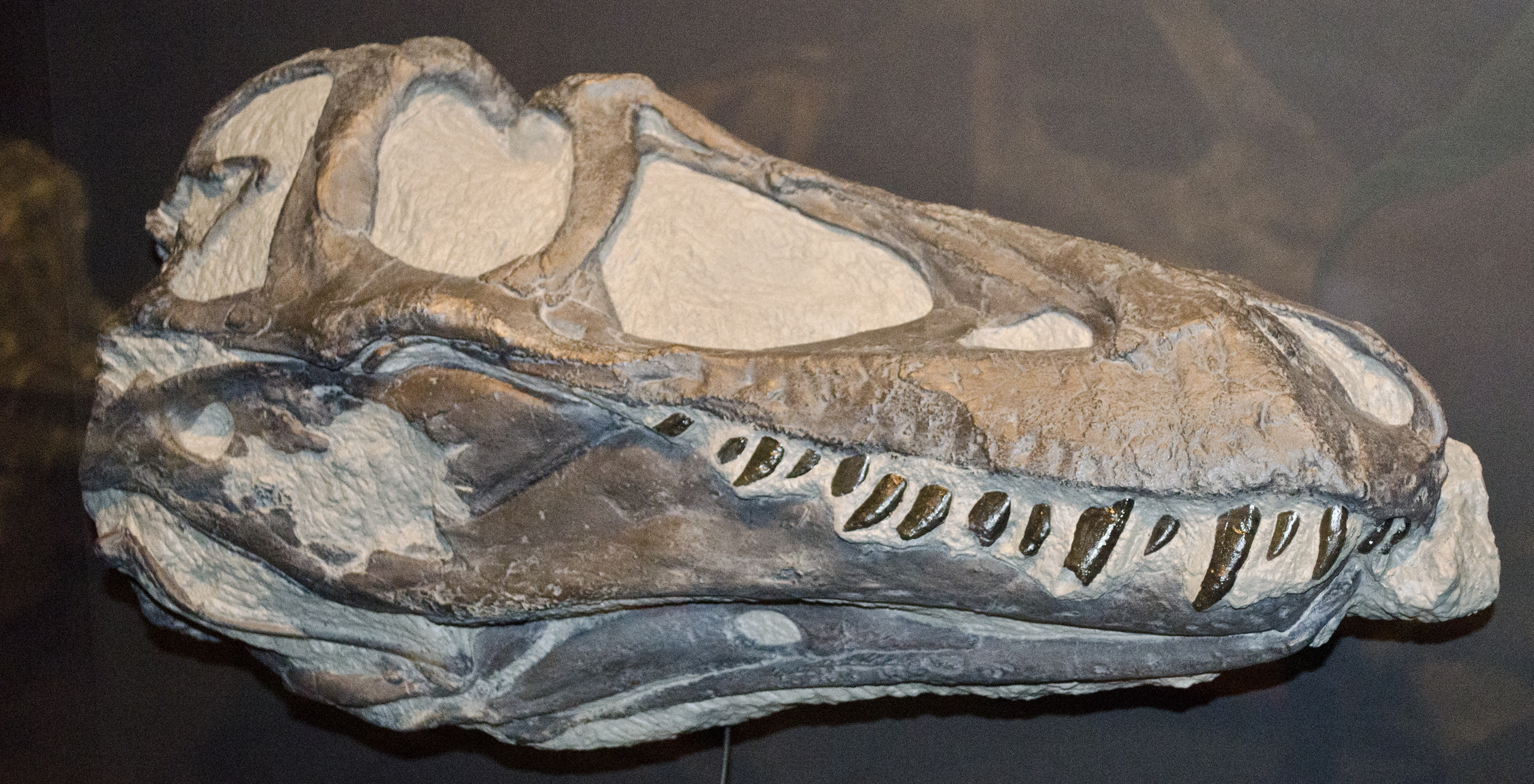
Skull of a juvenile D. horneri

In the Oldman Formation (the geological equivalent of the Judith River formation), Daspletosaurus torosus could have preyed upon the hadrosaur species Brachylophosaurus canadensis, the ceratopsians Coronosaurus brinkmani and Albertaceratops nesmoi, pachycephalosaurs, ornithomimids, therizinosaurs, and possibly ankylosaurs. Other predators included troodontids, oviraptorosaurs, the dromaeosaurid Saurornitholestes, and possibly an albertosaurine tyrannosaur (genus currently unknown). The younger Dinosaur Park and Two Medicine Formations had faunas similar to the Oldman, with the Dinosaur Park in particular preserving an unrivaled array of dinosaurs. The albertosaurine Gorgosaurus lived alongside unnamed species of Daspletosaurus in the Dinosaur Park and Upper Two Medicine environments. Young tyrannosaurs may have filled the niches in between adult tyrannosaurs and smaller theropods, which were separated by two orders of magnitude in mass. A Saurornitholestes dentary has been discovered in the Dinosaur Park Formation that bore tooth marks left by the bite of a young tyrannosaur, possibly Daspletosaurus.

=== Coexistence with Gorgosaurus ===
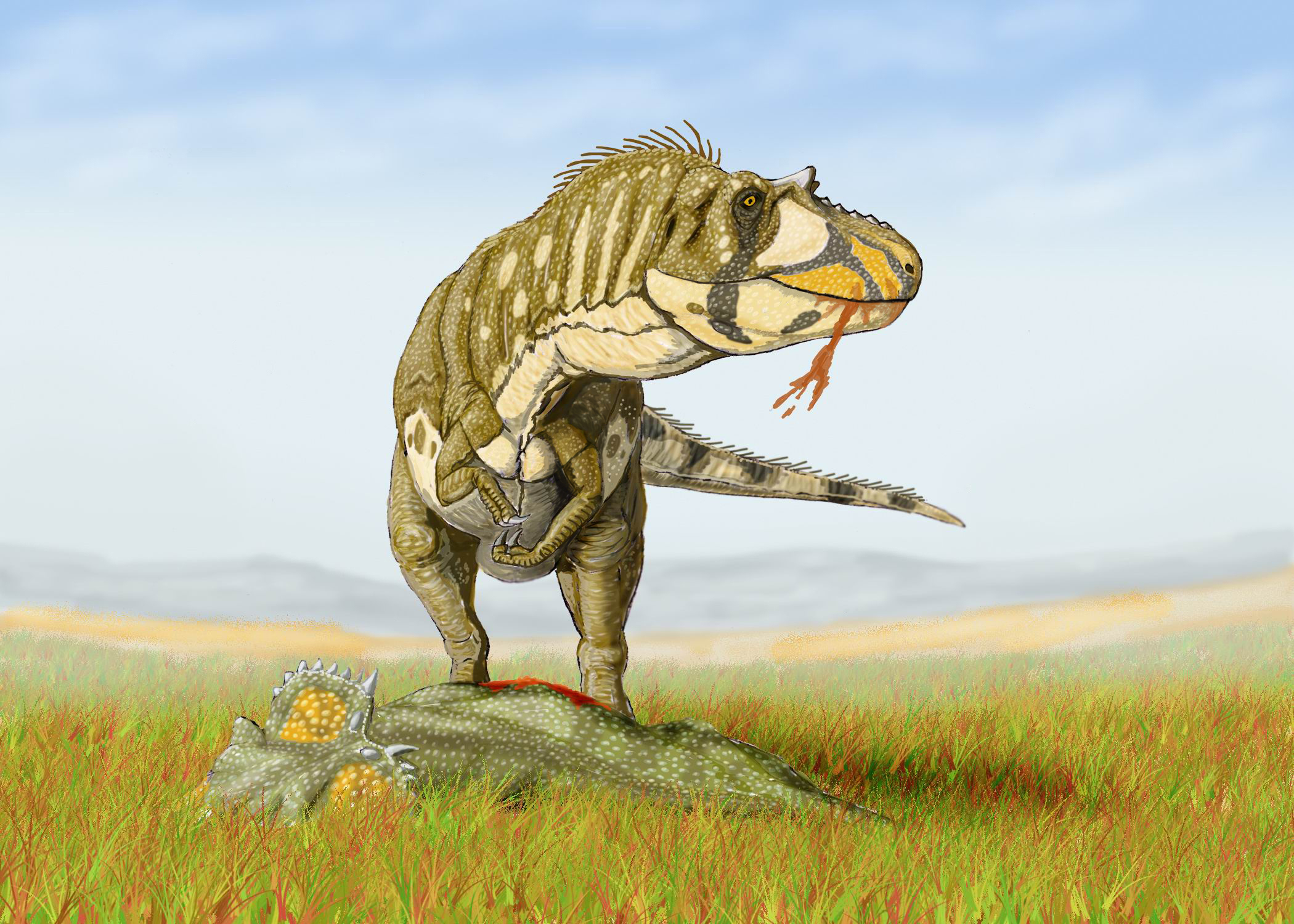
Restoration of Daspletosaurus torosus feeding on a juvenile ceratopsian

In the late Campanian of North America, Daspletosaurus was a contemporary of the albertosaurine tyrannosaurid Gorgosaurus. This is one of the few examples of two tyrannosaur genera coexisting. In modern predator guilds, similar-sized predators are separated into different ecological niches by anatomical, behavioral or geographical differences that limit competition. Several studies have attempted to explain niche differentiation in Daspletosaurus and Gorgosaurus.

Dale Russell hypothesized that the more lightly built and more common Gorgosaurus may have preyed on the abundant hadrosaurs of the time, while the more robust and less common Daspletosaurus may have specialized on the less prevalent but better-defended ceratopsids, which may have been more difficult to hunt. However, a specimen of Daspletosaurus (OTM 200) from the Two Medicine Formation preserves the digested remains of a juvenile hadrosaur in its gut region. The higher and broader muzzles of tyrannosaurines like Daspletosaurus are mechanically stronger than the lower snouts of albertosaurines like Gorgosaurus, although tooth strengths are similar between the two groups. This may indicate a difference in feeding mechanics or diet.

Other authors have suggested that competition was limited by geographical separation. Unlike some other groups of dinosaurs, there appears to be no correlation with distance from the sea. Neither Daspletosaurus nor Gorgosaurus was more common at higher or lower elevations than the other. However, while there is some overlap, Gorgosaurus appears to be more common at northern latitudes, with species of Daspletosaurus more abundant to the south. The same pattern is seen in other groups of dinosaurs. Chasmosaurine ceratopsians and saurolophine hadrosaurs are also more common in the Two Medicine Formation and in southwestern North America during the Campanian. Thomas Holtz has suggested that this pattern indicates shared ecological preferences between tyrannosaurines, chasmosaurines and hadrosaurines. Holtz notes that, at the end of the later Maastrichtian stage, tyrannosaurines like Tyrannosaurus, hadrosaurines and chasmosaurines like Triceratops were widespread throughout western North America, while albertosaurines and centrosaurines became extinct, and lambeosaurines were very rare.

== See also ==
- Timeline of tyrannosaur research
- 2017 in archosaur paleontology
