= Rocky Mountain Dinosaur Resource Center =

Museum in Woodland Park, Colorado

Coordinates: 38.993743°N 105.051307°W

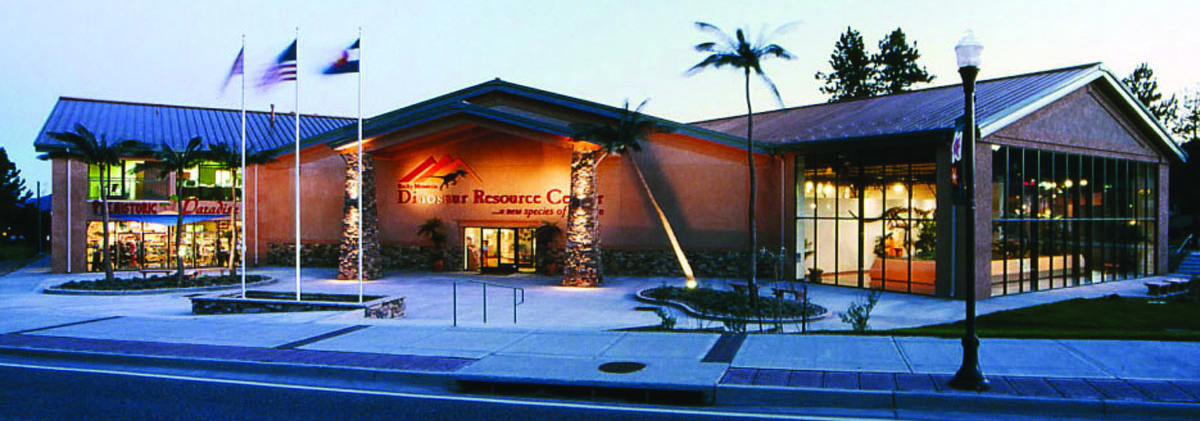
- Rocky Mountain Dinosaur Resource Center viewed from US Highway 24 in Woodland Park, Colorado
- Established: May 2004
- Location: U.S. Highway 24 at Fairview Street; Woodland Park, Colorado
- Type: Natural history
- Visitors: About 100,000 annually
- Director: J.J. Triebold
- Curator: Anthony Maltese
- Website: RMDRC.com

The Rocky Mountain Dinosaur Resource Center is a fossil museum primarily exhibiting fossil organisms of North America's Late Cretaceous including dinosaurs, pterosaurs, marine reptiles, and fish. The museum includes a fossil preparation lab and a large gift shop. Live tours are delivered by visitor experience guides highlighting the history of the individual specimens as well as the paleontology of the fossil species they represent. The RMDRC is headquarters to its parent company, Triebold Paleontology Incorporated.

== History ==
VOA report about the museum

The Dinosaur Resource Center was created to be an intentionally temporary fossil repository, displaying fossil specimens collected and cast by Triebold Paleontology Incorporated. The museum was opened to the public in May, 2004, exhibiting original and replica specimens including dinosaurs, pterosaurs and an extensive collection of Late Cretaceous marine fossil organisms primarily from the shale and chalk beds of Western Kansas. Since its opening, the Dinosaur Resource Center has exhibited a number of important original fossil specimens on their way to academic institutions including the holotype specimens of Anzu wyliei, Mercuriceratops gemini and other yet-to-be-named fossil species.

== Exhibits ==
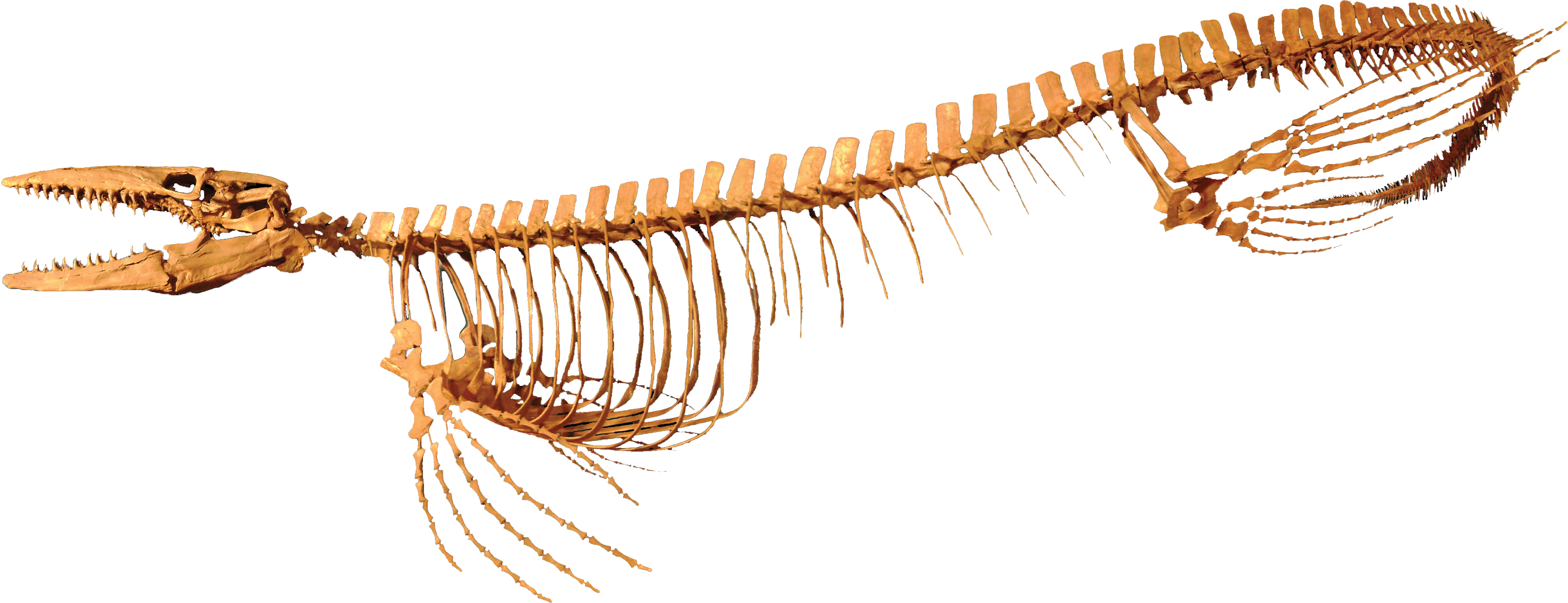
T. kansasensis mounted skeleton

The museum has two main fossil exhibit halls, one featuring primarily terrestrial fossil species including dinosaurs, pterosaurs and fossil mammals, and the other featuring fossil marine organisms such as fish, mosasaurs and plesiosaurs. Many original fossil specimens are displayed as tactile exhibits available for guests to touch. A hands-on children's corner includes a touchscreen featuring 3D digital models and other hands-on activities like fossil dig stations and puzzles.

== Location ==
The Dinosaur Resource Center is located on the south side of U.S. Highway 24 (Colorado) at Fairview Street in Woodland Park, Colorado.

== Gallery ==
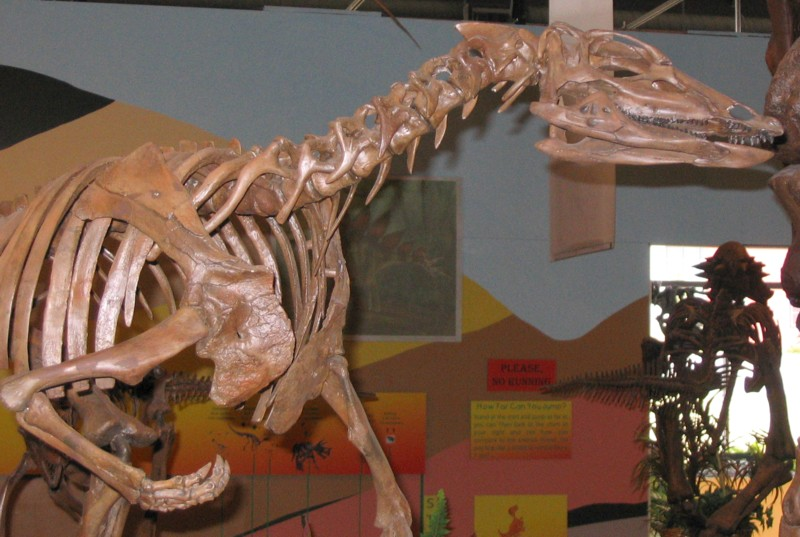
Front of Thescelosaurus

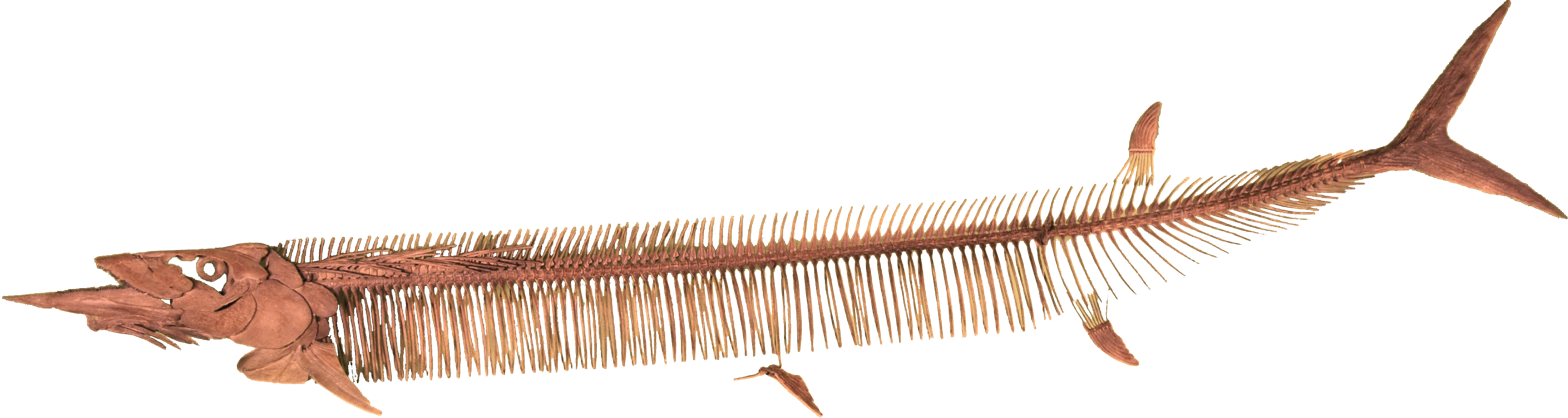
Saurodon leanus

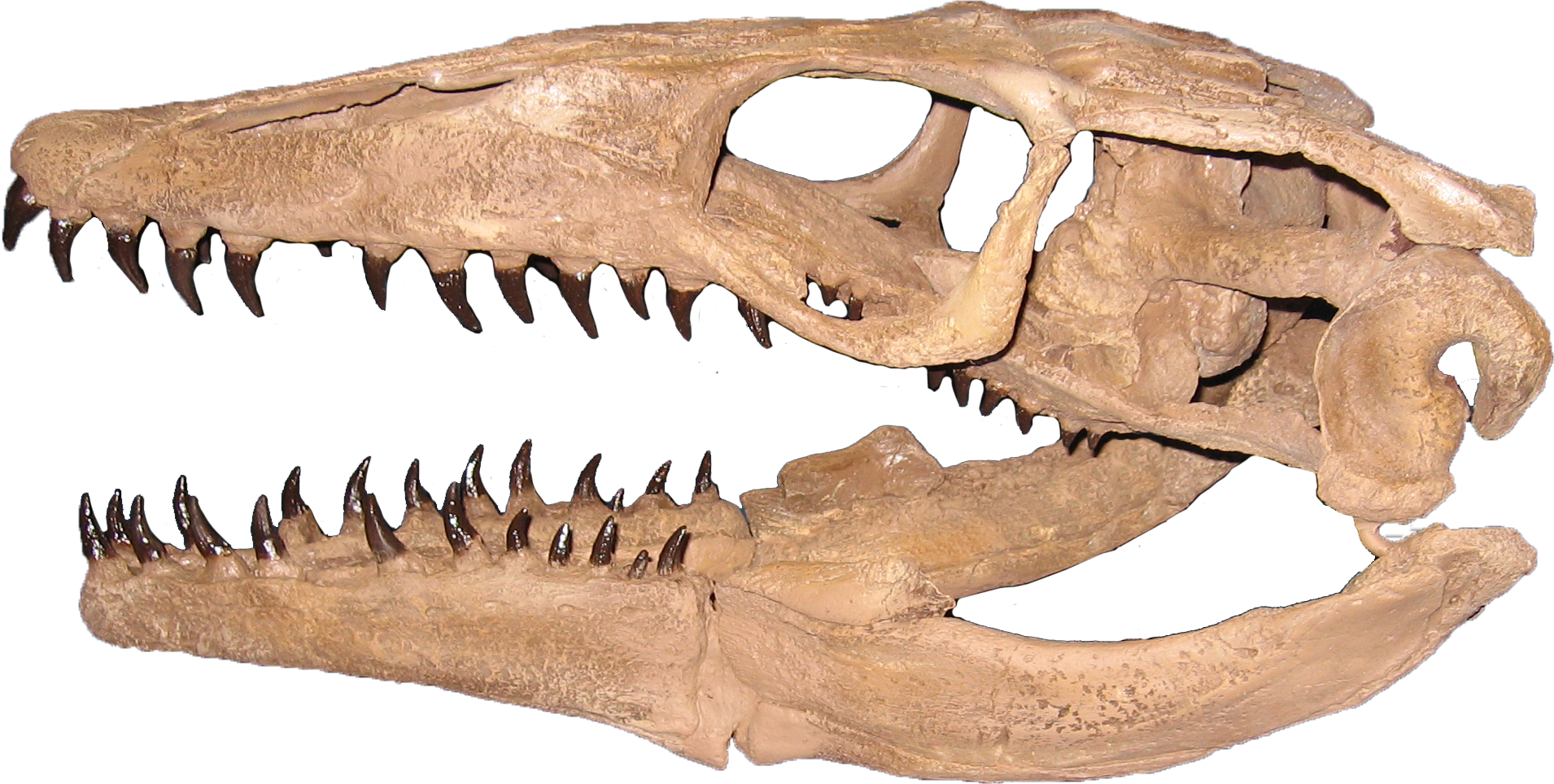
Plioplatecarpus skull

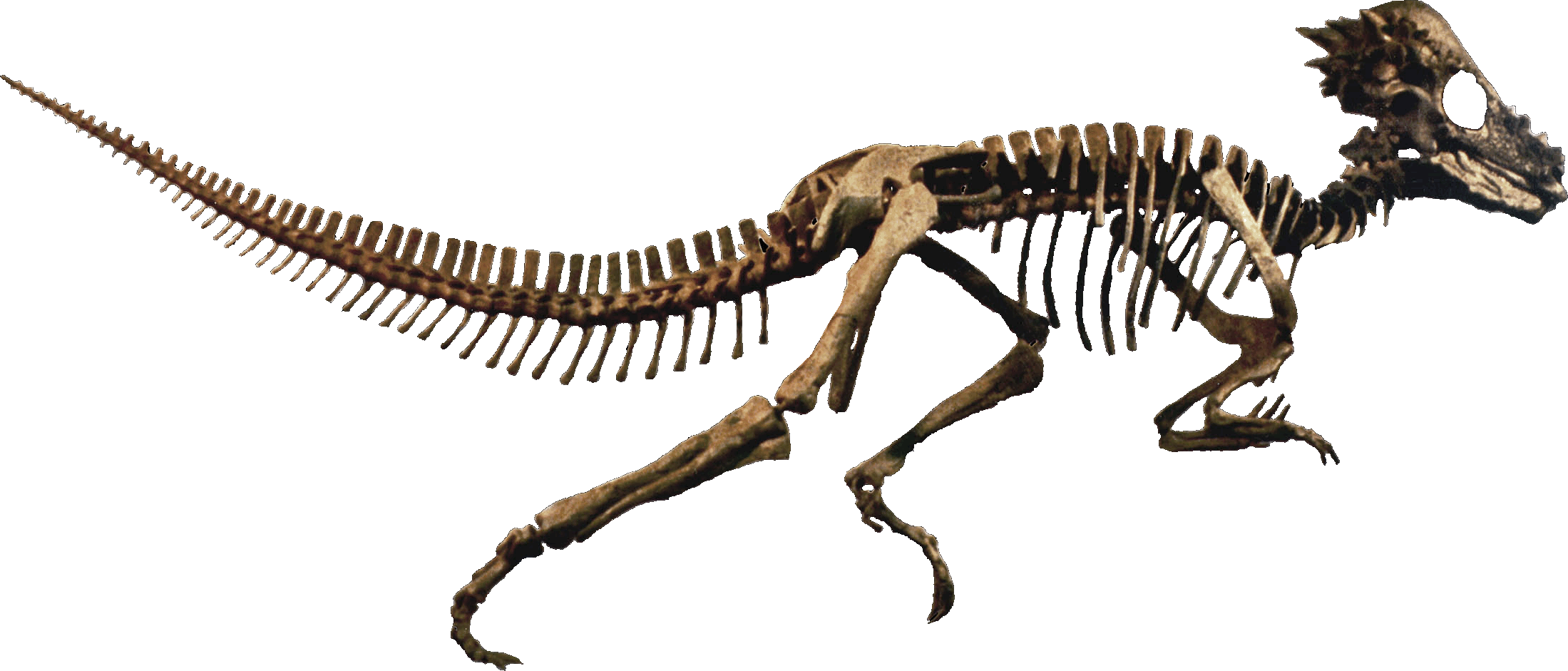
Pachycephalosaurus

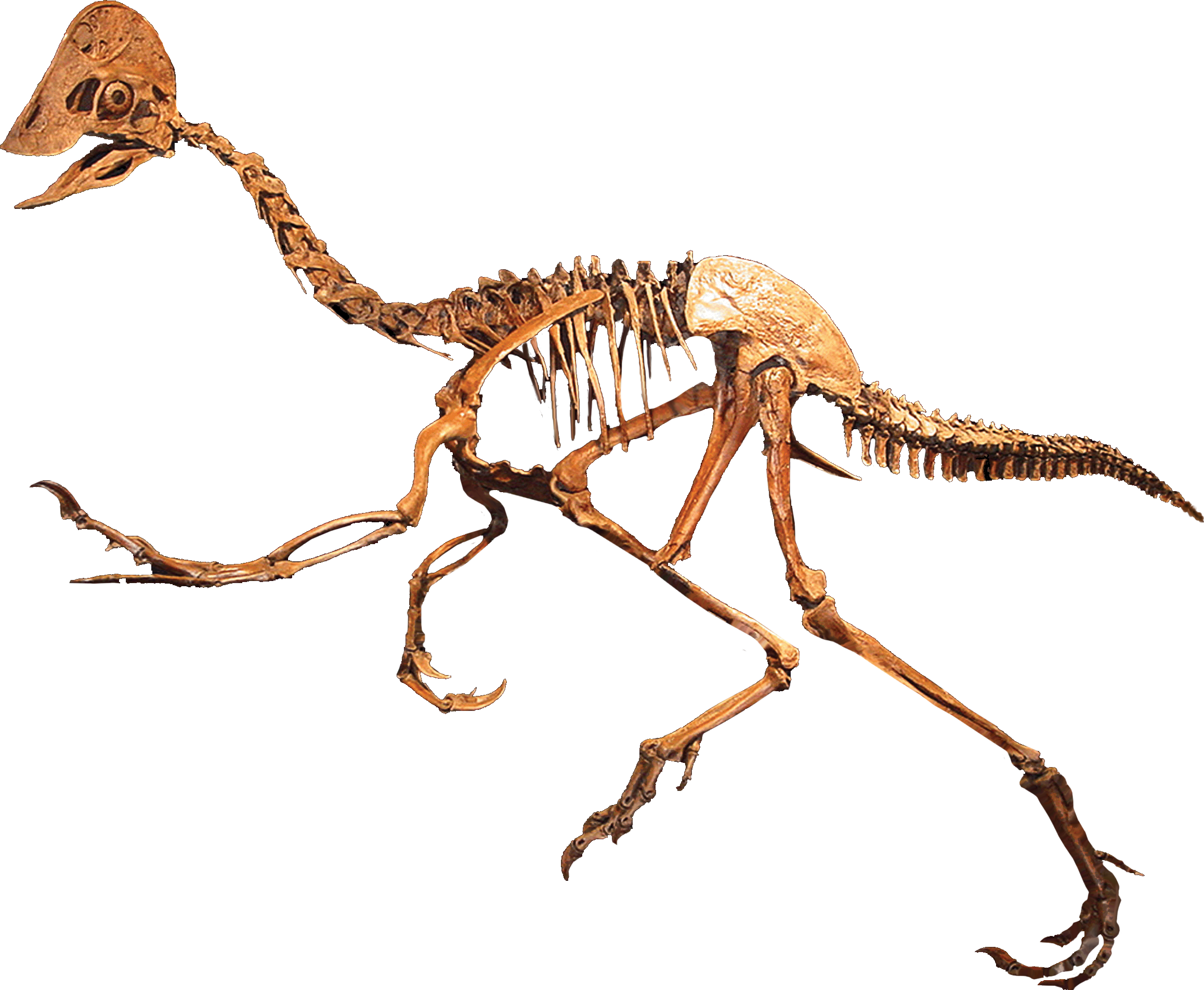
Anzu wyliei skeleton cast

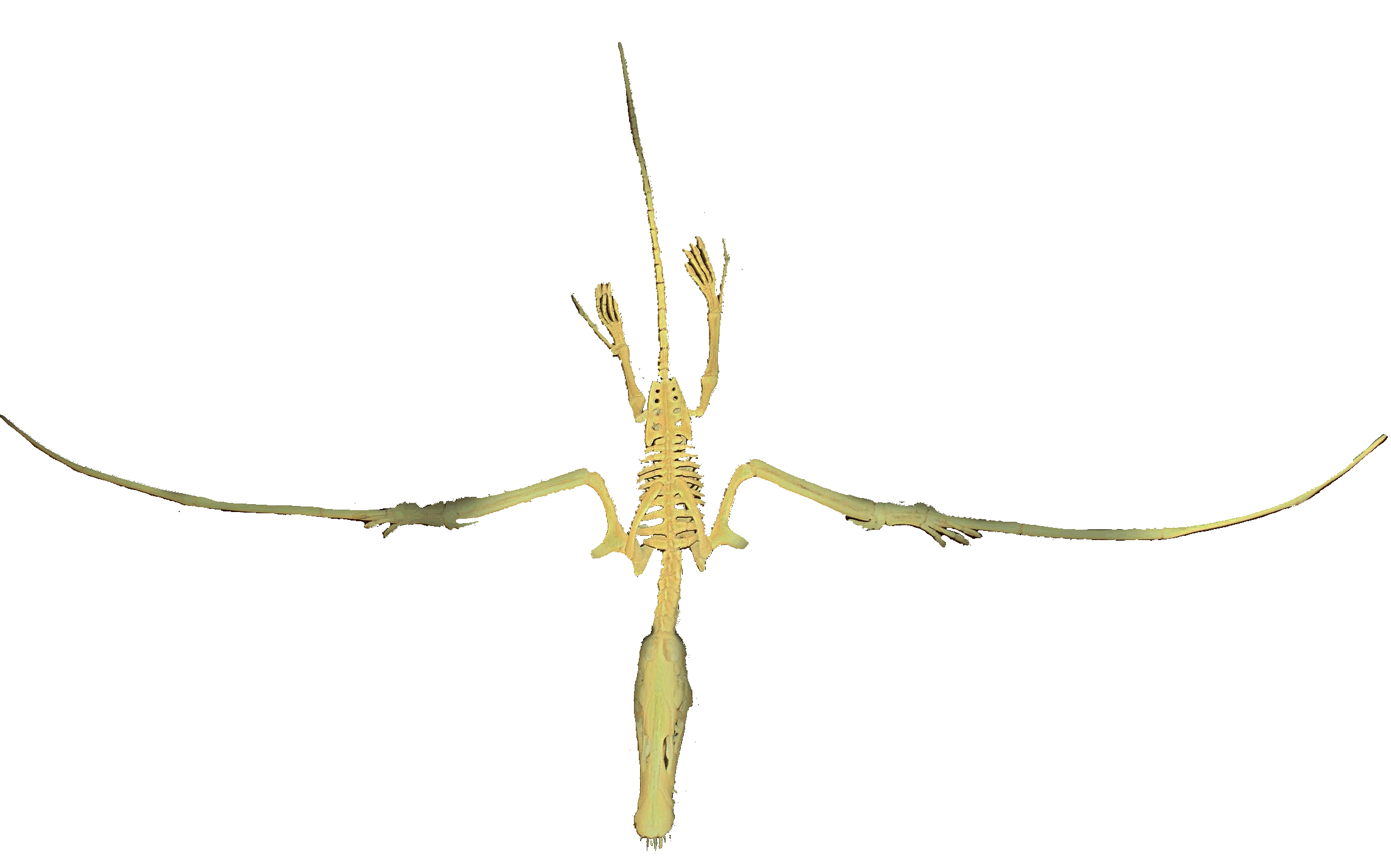
Dorygnathus in flight

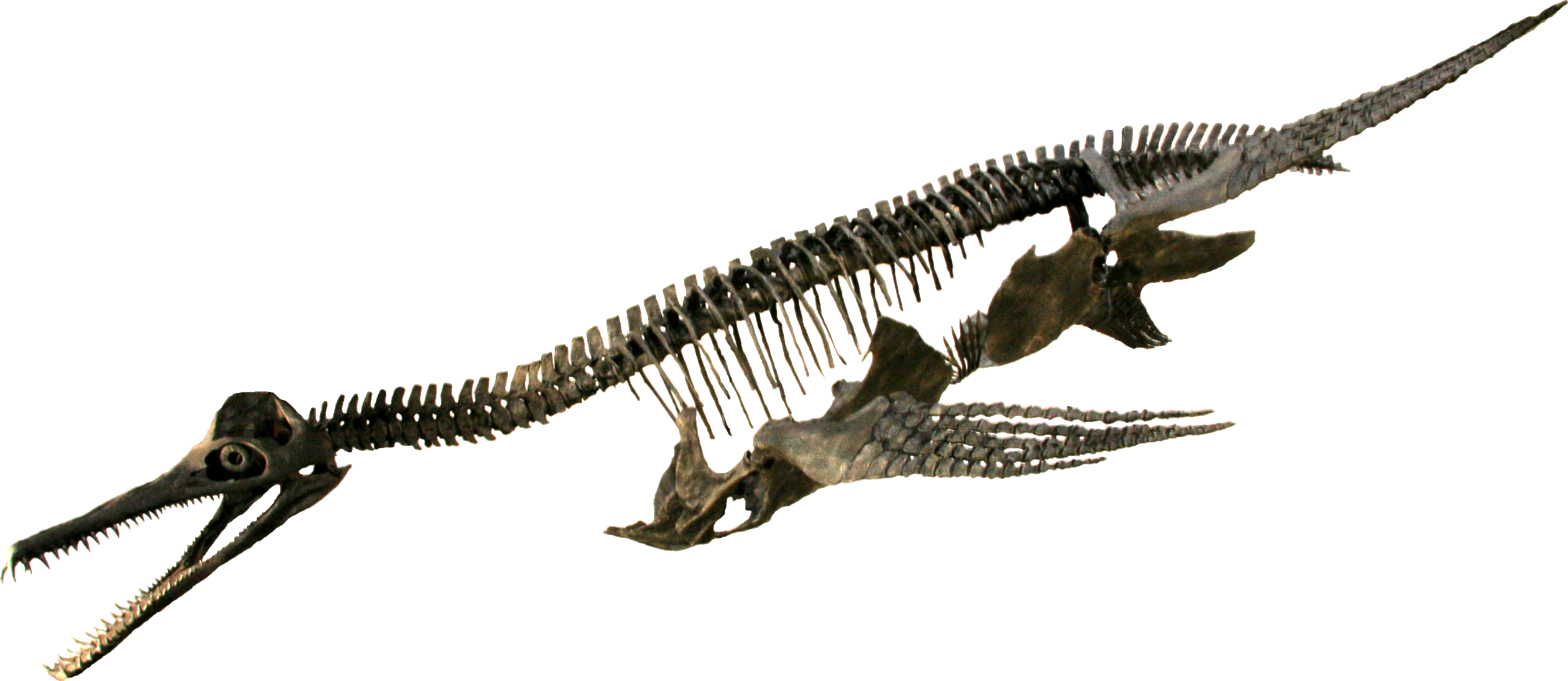
Martinectes bonneri

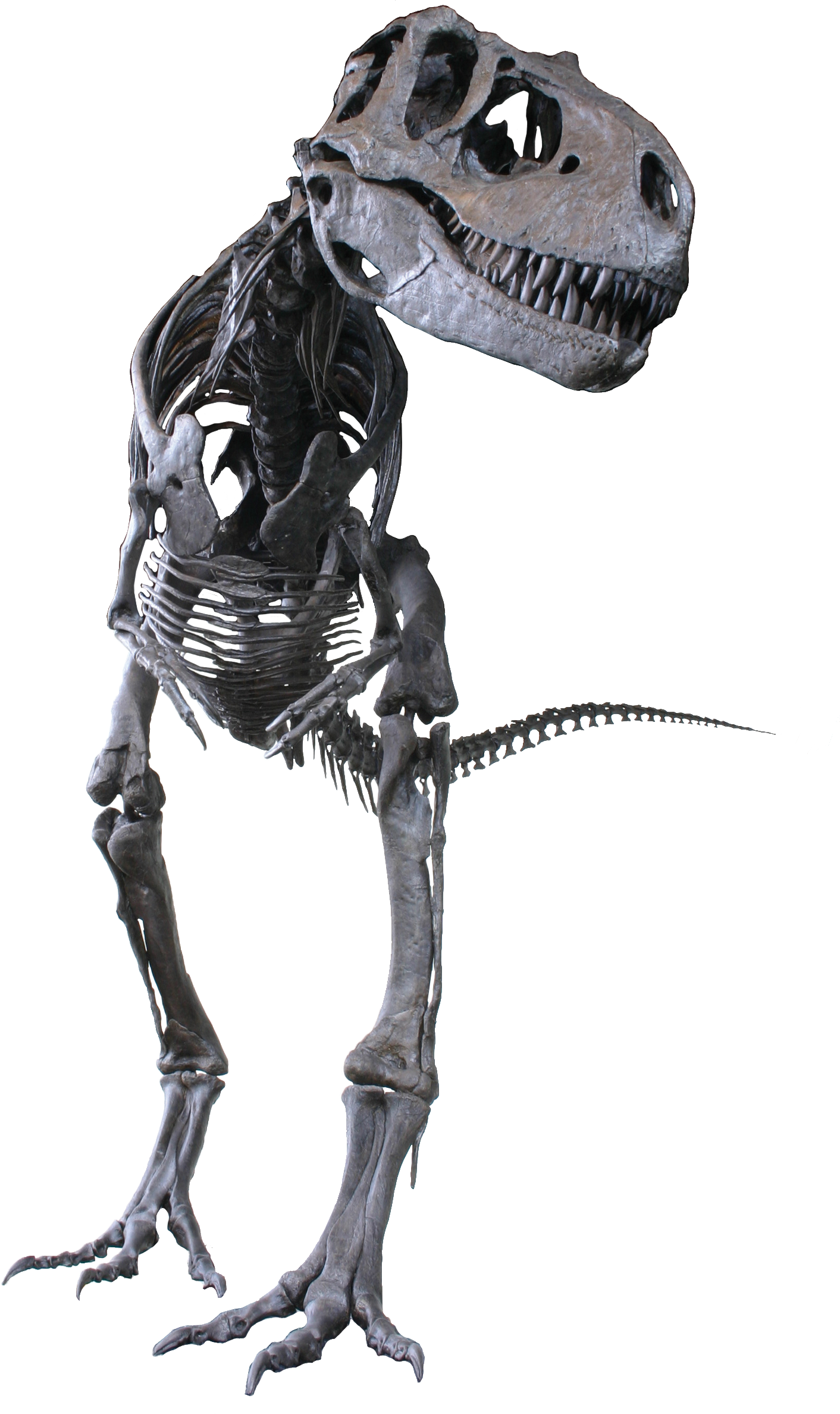
Cast of Albertosaurus

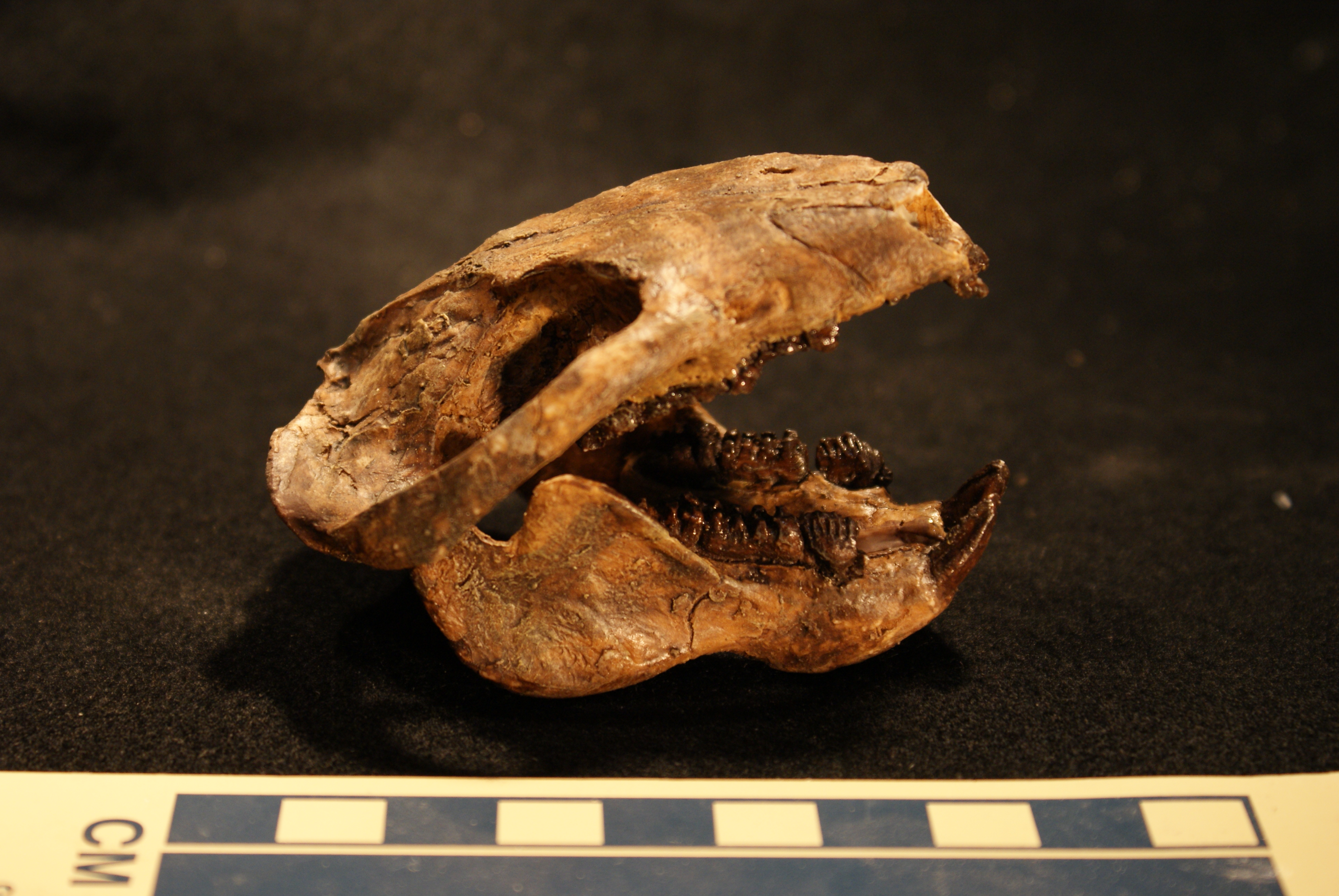
Meniscoessus skull

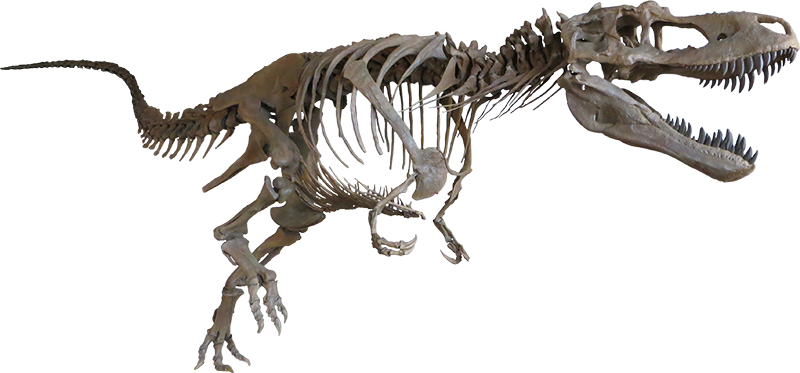
Daspletosaurus torosus
