= 1830 in paleontology =

Paleontology or palaeontology is the study of prehistoric life forms on Earth through the examination of plant and animal fossils. This includes the study of body fossils, tracks (ichnites), burrows, cast-off parts, fossilised feces (coprolites), palynomorphs and chemical residues. Because humans have encountered fossils for millennia, paleontology has a long history both before and after becoming formalized as a science. This article records significant discoveries and events related to paleontology that occurred or were published in the year 1830.

== Archosauromorphs ==
=== Crocodylomorphs ===
==== New taxa ====
Taxon	Novelty	Status	Author(s)	Age	Unit	Location	Notes	Images
Aeolodon	Gen. nov.	Valid	von Meyer	Kimmeridgian	Solnhofen Formation	Germany	A teleosaurid, named for Crocodilus priscus.	

=== Pterosaurs ===
- Georg Wagler argued that pterosaurs represented a distinct class of aquatic vertebrates that he called Gryphi. Like Collini, Wagler thought that pterosaurs swam underwater using their forelimbs as flippers.

==== New taxa ====
Taxon	Novelty	Status	Author(s)	Age	Unit	Location	Notes	Images
Ornithocephalus banthensis	Sp. nov.	Valid	Theodori	Toarcian	Posidonia Shale	Germany	Later renamed Dorygnathus banthensis	

=== Other archosauromorphs ===
==== New taxa ====
Taxon	Novelty	Status	Author(s)	Age	Unit	Location	Notes	Images
Protorosaurus speneri	Gen. et sp. nov.	Valid	von Meyer	Guadalupian, 260–251 mya	Pirambola Formation	Germany	One of the most primitive archosauromorphs. Previously considered to be related to Prolacerta within Prolacertiformes, but now a new genus shows that they were in fact not closely related.	
