= Triebold Paleontology Incorporated =

Paleontological Services Company

Triebold Paleontology, Inc. logo

Triebold Paleontology Incorporated (TPI) is a company based in Woodland Park, Colorado, United States providing fossil-related goods and services. TPI is headquartered in the Rocky Mountain Dinosaur Resource Center. Subsidiary companies of TPI include the traveling exhibitions company, Embedded Exhibitions, LLC, Dinosaur Sanctuary, and the Rocky Mountain Dinosaur Resource Center.

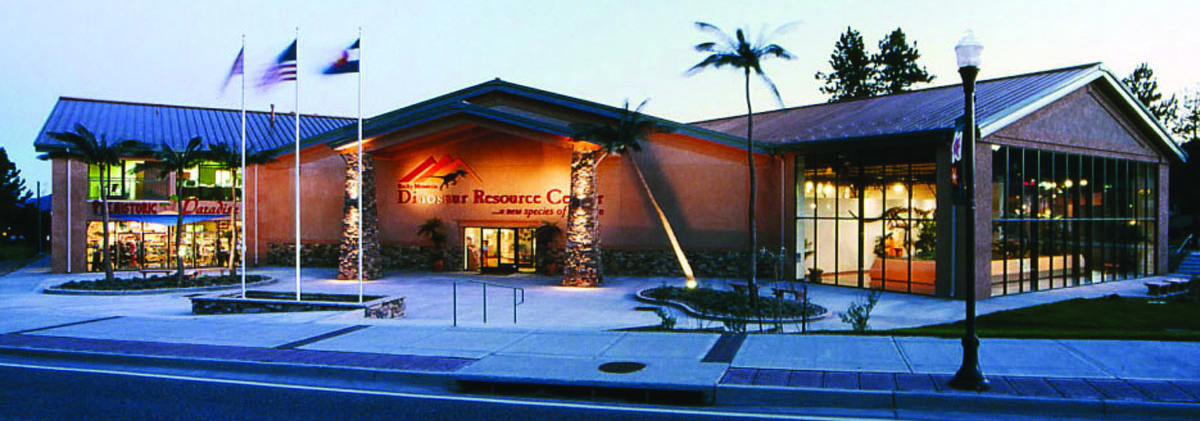
Rocky Mountain Dinosaur Resource Center viewed from US Highway 24 in Woodland Park, CO

== History ==
Triebold Paleontology Incorporated was established in 1989 and is headed by Michael Triebold. The traveling exhibition, Savage Ancient Seas, was created and hosted in 2000 and Triebold started a subsidiary company to put its traveling exhibition business under a separate brand, Embedded Exhibitions, in 2001. In 2004, the Rocky Mountain Dinosaur Resource Center was opened as the world's first intentionally temporary fossil repository, TPI's new headquarters and as a natural history museum serving around 100,000 visitors annually.

== Services ==
Triebold Paleontology Incorporated supplies real and replicated fossil specimens to museums and collectors. Leases on over 30 private localities rich in Late Cretaceous fossils are held and regularly prospected by TPI paleontologists. Triebold Paleontology Incorporated provides every fossil-related service in the museums service industry including molding and casting, preparation and restoration, prospecting and collecting, and mounting and remounting fossils and petroleum casts.

== See also ==
- Asteroid 45519 Triebold
