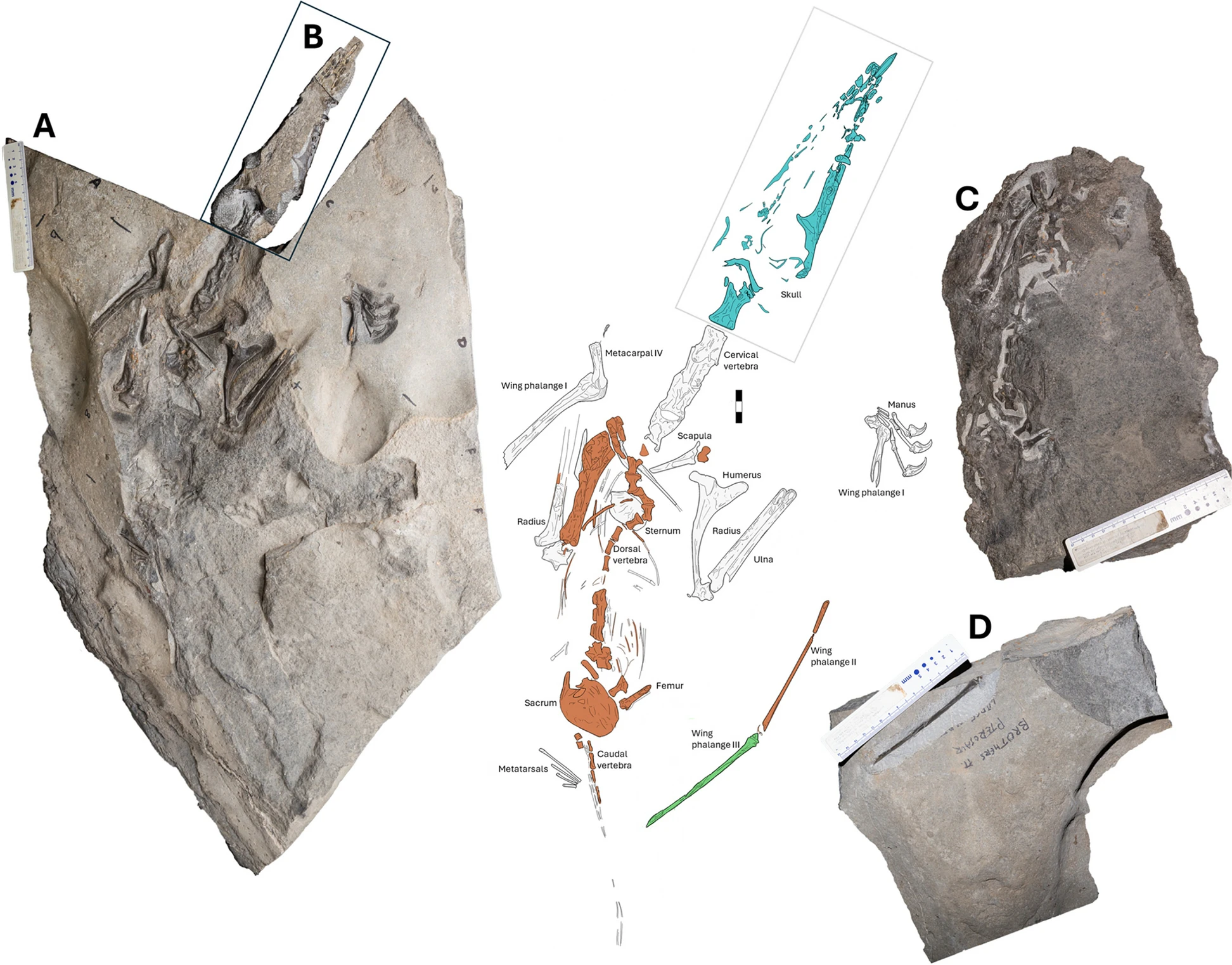
- Holotype of Dearc

Scientific classification
- Kingdom: Animalia
- Phylum: Chordata
- Class: Reptilia
- Order: †Pterosauria
- Family: †Rhamphorhynchidae
- Tribe: †Angustinaripterini
- Genus: †Dearc; Jagielska et al., 2022
- Species: †D. sgiathanach

Binomial name
- †Dearc sgiathanach Jagielska et al., 2022

= Dearc =

Dearc Temporal range: Middle Jurassic, Bathonian

Genus of rhamphorhynchine pterosaur

Dearc (Scottish Gaelic pronunciation: [tʲɛrxk] dearc) is a genus of large-bodied rhamphorhynchine pterosaur from the Middle Jurassic Lealt Shale Formation of Scotland. The holotype, a juvenile or subadult that was still actively growing, has an estimated wingspan of 2.5 to 3 meters, making it the largest flying animal of its time. This pushes the origin of large pterosaurs back significantly, as it was previously assumed that pterosaurs did not reach greater body sizes until the short-tailed pterodactyloid lineages of the Cretaceous. The genus contains a single species, Dearc sgiathanach ([ˈtʲɛɾxk ˈs̪kʲiəhanəx] dearc sgiathanach).

== Discovery and naming ==
The holotype of Dearc, NMS G.2021.6.1-4, was found in 2017 by Amelia Penny in the Lealt Shale Formation and consists of a three-dimensionally preserved skeleton preserved in articulation in a slab of limestone (separated into four pieces for preparation). The specimen preserves most of the body with the exception of the end of the tail, most of the hindlimbs, parts of the wing and the very tip of the beak. The specimen was found on the east coast of the peninsula of Trotternish, part of the Isle of Skye in north-west Scotland, and the rock slab removed to the University of Edinburgh. The fossil was prepared by Nigel Larkin. It is to be displayed by National Museums Scotland.

In 2022, the type species Dearc sgiathanach was named and described by Natalia Jagielska, Michael O’Sullivan, Gregory F. Funston, Ian B. Butler, Thomas J. Challands, Neil D.L. Clark, Nicholas C. Fraser, Amelia Penny, Dugald A. Ross, Mark Wilkinson and Stephen Louis Brusatte. The name is derived from the Scottish Gaelic language and has a double meaning. It can be simultaneously translated as "winged reptile" and "reptile from Skye", as dearc means "reptile" and sgiathanach (from sgiathan "small wing") means "winged", an element that also appears in the Gaelic name of the Isle of Skye (An t-Eilean Sgiathanach), often interpreted as meaning "The Winged Island".

== Description ==
=== Size ===
Different wingspan estimates for Dearc (based on Rhamphorhynchus and Dorygnathus)

The wingspan could not be directly measured for Dearc as several phalanges of the wingfinger were missing, in particular the very tip and a central portion of the wing. However, an estimate could be made based on comparison with better sampled taxa, in this case Rhamphorhynchus and Dorygnathus. Using the proportions of Rhamphorhynchus, an estimated wingspan between 2.2 meters (based on skull length) and 3.8 meters (based on humerus length) was recovered. Estimates based on the humerus length of Dorygnathus give an estimated wingspan of 1.9 meters. These results already make Dearc one of the largest known Jurassic pterosaurs, larger than the largest Dorygnathus (1.69 meters wingspan) and smaller among non-pterodactyloids only than a large rhamphorhynchid specimen from Ettling in Germany, consisting of two possible neck vertebrae, which may belong to the genus Rhamphorhynchus. The larger interpretation is favored by the authors for a series of reasons including the well established ontogenetic series of Rhamphorhynchus, phylogenetic proximity.

Dearc possesses several features typical of fully grown adults in the related Rhamphorhynchus, including the large recurved teeth of the premaxilla, the well developed crest of the humerus, fusion between the scapula-coracoid, smooth bone texture and other features. However, at the same time other areas of the fossil show signs of immaturity, including unfused bones of the skull and unfused sacral vertebrae. Histology supports the later interpretation, indicating that, while at least two years old at its time of death, the animal was still actively growing. The wing bone shows two prominent lines of growth that allow this interpretation and further suggest that it died shortly after emerging from a hiatus in growth. The fact that the holotype of Dearc was still growing makes a wingspan of up to three meters quite possible.

=== Skeletal anatomy ===
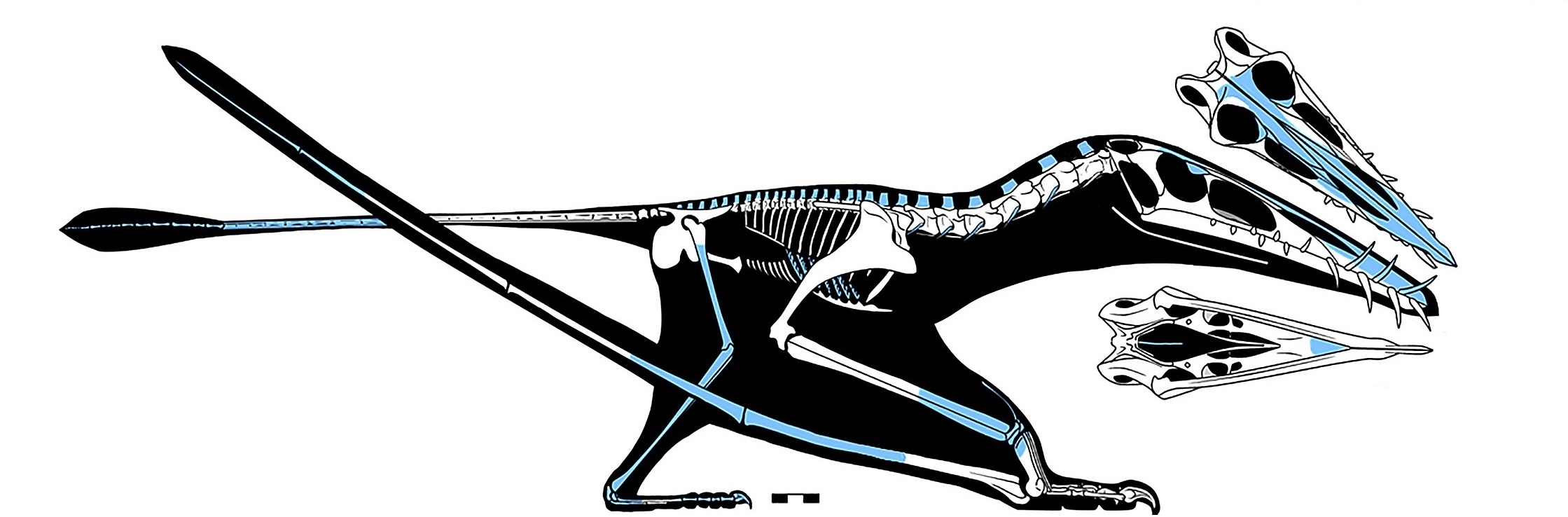
Skeletal reconstruction of holotype (known material in white)

Generally, Dearc shows the typical bodyplan of non-monofenestratan pterosaurs. The neck was short and the tail elongated, supported by interlocking zygapophyses of the caudal vertebrae. The mandibular symphysis is elongated and the metacarpus short. There are however some features shared with pterodactyloids such as a skull longer than the dorsal and sacral vertebrae combined and the shape of the quadrate. Furthermore, although proportionally short compared to pterodactyloids, the cervical vertebrae are notably elongated compared to other non-monofenestratans, resembling those of the more derived Wukongopterus. The dentition shows two distinct types of teeth: elongated fangs close to the tip of the snout and more conical peg-like teeth further back.

The describing authors indicated several distinguishing traits. Four are autapomorphies, unique derived characters. In the palate, the vomers contain three tubes, forming a trident. The contribution of the upper jaw bone, the maxilla, to the palate, in front of the choana, the inner nostril, has a depression. The brain has enlarged optic lobes that are expanded lengthwise. In the foot the fourth metatarsal is more robust than the first, second and third metatarsal, about 2.5 times as thick. Additionally, there are two traits that in themselves are not unique but the combination of which is unique. The infratemporal fenestra is pear-shaped, with the narrow part on top. In the palate, the ectopterygoid bone has an upwards projecting process, running through the choana and perpendicularly contacting the vomer.

Dearc possesses large, highly curved manual unguals with well-developed sesamoids and flexor tendons. This would suggest the claws would be retractable to some extent, allowing Dearc to elevate the tips of its claws above substrate when walking to maintain their function. The morphology of the claws suggests a role in scansorial or arboreal locomotion and perhaps supplement in predation, though more extensive analyses of the ungual morphologies of the taxon and other non-monofenestran pterosaurs with extant taxa is required.

== Classification ==
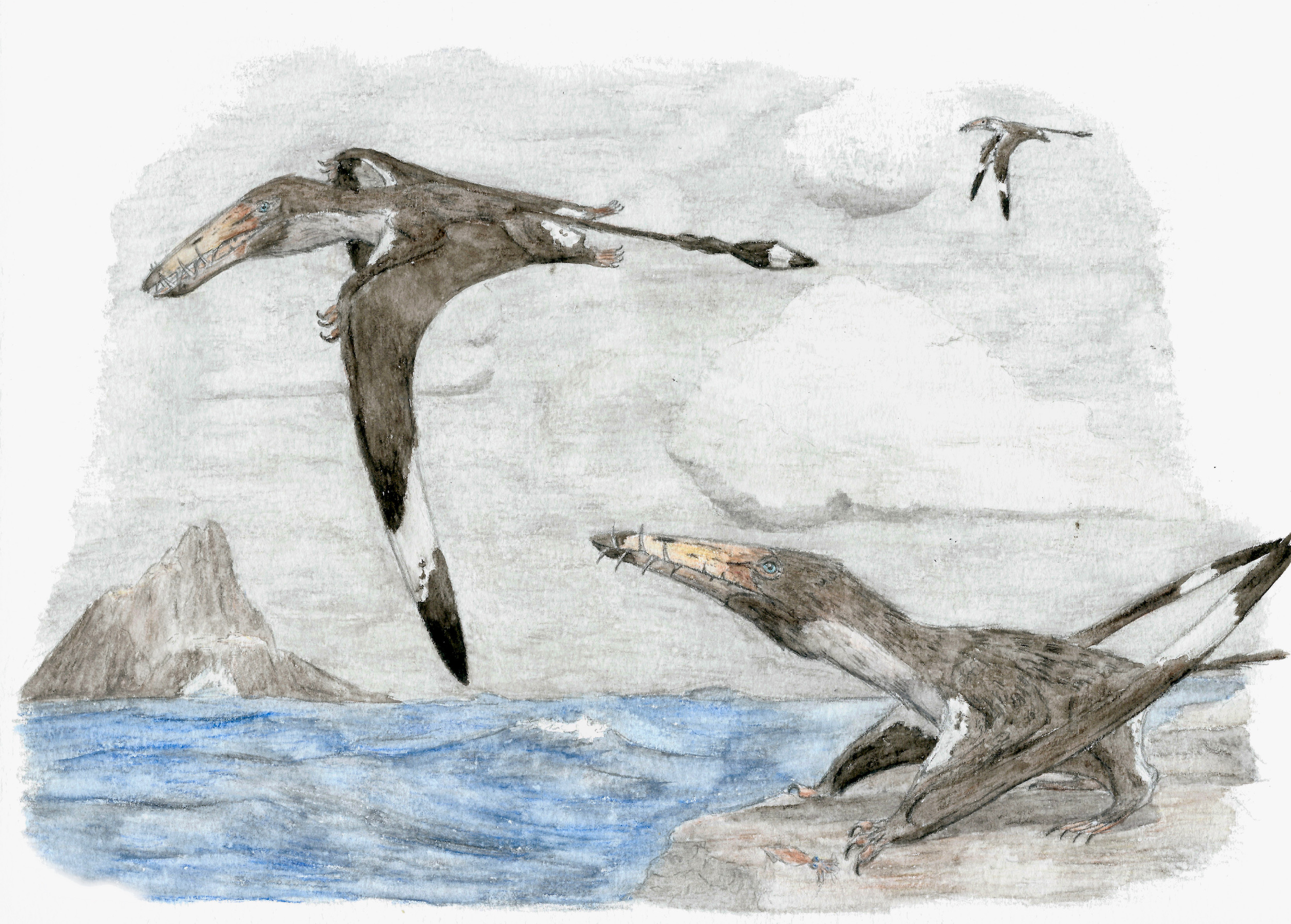
Speculative life restoration

The phylogenetic analysis conducted by Jagielska et al. (2022) for Dearc included characters from several independent publications as well as entirely new ones, while also excluding those that are only known from very young animals or known to vary greatly with age. The resulting tree recovered Dearc to lie within the Rhamphorhynchinae, specifically in the tribe Angustinaripterini, including Angustinaripterus and Sericipterus. These results are displayed in the cladogram below:

- - Lagerpetidae
  - - Raeticodactylus filisurensis
    - - Preondactylus bufarinii
      - Eudimorphodon ranzii
      - - - Dimorphodon macronyx
          - Caelestiventus hanseni
        - - Campylognathoides zitteli
          - - - Fenghuangopterus lii
              - Jianchangnathus robustus
              - Scaphognathus crassirostris
              - Dorygnathus banthensis
            - - Cacibupteryx caribensis
              - Parapsicephalus purdoni
            - - Rhamphorhynchus muensteri
              - Angustinaripterini
                - Angustinaripterus longicephalus
                - Dearc sgiathanach
                - Sericipterus wucaiwanensis
            - - Changchengopterus pani
              - Wukongopteridae
              - Anurognathidae
              - Pterodactyloidea

In their 2024 description of the monofenestratan pterosaur Skiphosoura, Hone and colleagues recovered Dearc and Angustinaripterus as independent consecutive branches at the very base of the Pterodactylomorpha. Rhamphorhynchini was found to be the sister taxon to pterodactylomorphs, forming the broader clade Breviquartossa.
