= Jianchangopterus =

Jianchangopterus Temporal range: Middle Jurassic

Scientific classification
- Domain: Eukaryota
- Kingdom: Animalia
- Phylum: Chordata
- Order: †Pterosauria
- Family: †Rhamphorhynchidae
- Subfamily: †Rhamphorhynchinae
- Genus: †Jianchangopterus; Lü & Bo, 2011

Type species
- Jianchangopterus zhaoianus Lü & Bo, 2011

Genus of rhamphorhynchid pterosaur from the Middle Jurassic

Jianchangopterus (meaning "wing from Jianchang") is an extinct genus of rhamphorhynchid pterosaur from the Middle Jurassic of western Liaoning, China. Jianchangopterus is known from a nearly complete skeleton with skull preserved. It was collected from the Tiaojishan Formation. It was first named (after Jianchang County) by Lü Junchang and Bo Xue in 2011 and the type species is Jianchangopterus zhaoianus, named for Zhao Limin, who was instrumental in the study of the only known fossil.

== Discovery and naming ==
The holotype, and only known fossil, of Jianchangopterus is a fully-complete skeleton preserved in articulation in a single slab with a counter-slab. It was uncovered at a locality called Linglongta in Jianchang County in Liaoning Province of China. This particular locality is part of the Tiaojishan Formation and it is extremely productive, and has yielded a wide variety of vertebrate, invertebrate, and plant fossils. The holotype of Jianchangopterus was collected and stored in the Yizhou Museum and was given the specimen number YHK-0931. It was described and named in 2011 by Lü Junchang and Bo Xue.

== Description ==
Jianchangopterus was a relatively small pterosaur, comparable in both size and morphology to Sordes. The skull was 43 mm (1.7 in) long and the combined length of the arm and finger bones was about 162 mm (6.4 in), which translates to a wingspan of at least 32 cm (13 in). Taphonomic damage to the fossil makes these measurements uncertain, and some of the sizes of individual bones are estimates. The authors of its description remark that it most likely ate insects, whereas most of the other pterosaurs it lived with likely ate fish.

Jianchangopterus can be distinguished from all other pterosaurs by the following autapomorphies: seven teeth on each side of the upper jaw and six teeth in the lower jaw, a recess on the maxilla, an even dental margin, a ridge along the center of the mandibular symphysis, a strongly curved fourth phalanx of the wing finger, a very slender first phalanx of the wing finger (relative to the other three), and a relatively short fourth phalanx on the fourth toe.

== Classification ==
Jianganchopterus was assigned to the family Rhamphorhynchidae and the subfamily Scaphognathinae by Lü and Bo. They made this assignment based on the presence of several synapomorphies of scaphognathines shared by Jianchangopterus including a relatively short skull, a relatively short wing finger, a long fifth toe, and a relatively long ulna. The authors remarked that it is likely a close relative of Sordes, while also being closely related to Scaphognathus, Harpactognathus, and Fenghuangopterus.

== Paleoenvironment ==
The only known Jianchangopterus fossil was found in rocks assigned to the Tiaojishan Formation, dating to the Callovian-Oxfordian age of the Middle-Late Jurassic, dated to approximately 159 million years ago. The ecosystem preserved in the Tiaojishan Formation is a forest dominated by bennettitales, ginkgo trees, conifers, and leptosporangiate ferns. These forests surrounded large lakes in the shadow of active volcanoes, ash from which was responsible for the remarkable preservation of many of the fossils. Based on the Tiajishan's plant life, its climate would have been subtropical to temperate, warm and humid.

The Linglongta locality, where Jianchangopterus was found, is one of the most productive fossil sites in the Tiaojishan Formation. Fossils of ostracods, branchiopods, insects, fishes, turtles, and plants are abundant, and a huge diversity of terrestrial vertebrate fossils have also been found. Among these are the theropods Anchiornis and Xiaotingia, the ornithischian Tianyulong, and a huge assemblage of pterosaurs. Pterosaurs known include the istiodactylid Archaeoistiodactylus, Wukongopterus, Kunpengopterus, three species of Darwinopterus, Douzhanopterus, and several rhamphorhynchids including Jianchangnathus, Scaphognathus, and Fenghuangopterus.

== See also ==
- 2011 in archosaur paleontology
- Haifanggou Formation
- Lagerstätte
- List of pterosaur genera
- Timeline of pterosaur research
