= Tuchengzi Formation =

Geological formation in China

- Stratigraphic range: Kimmeridgian-Berriasian; ~154–139 Ma
- Type: Geological formation
- Underlies: Zhangjiakou Formation
- Overlies: Tiaojishan Formation
- Thickness: 870–2,900 metres (2,850–9,510 ft)

Lithology
- Primary: Shale
- Other: Sandstone, mudstone

Location
- Coordinates: 42.9°N 124.0°E
- Approximate paleocoordinates: 44.1°N 126.1°E
- Region: Beijing, Hebei, Liaoning
- Country: China

Type section
- Named for: Tuchengzi, Beipiao, Liaoning
- Named by: Chao-Chi Lin
- Year defined: 1942
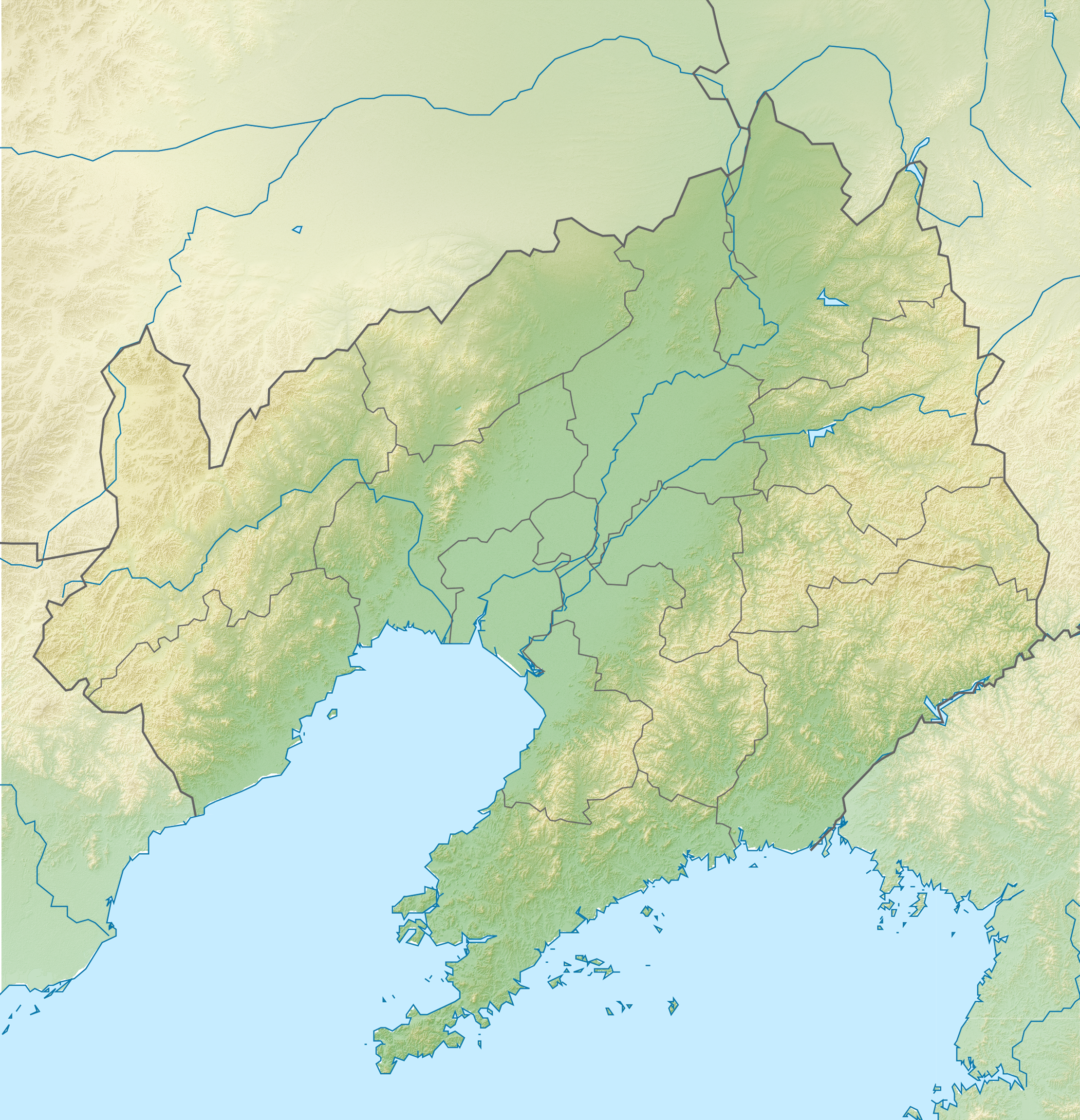
- Tuchengzi Formation (China) Tuchengzi Formation (Liaoning)

The Tuchengzi Formation (formerly known as Tucheng Conglomerate, from Chinese: 土城子; pinyin: Tǔchéngzǐ) is a geological formation in China whose strata span the Tithonian (Late Jurassic) to Berriasian (Early Cretaceous) ages. Dinosaur fossils, particularly footprints, have been found from the formation.

== Fossil content ==
Color key: Taxon / Reclassified taxon / Taxon falsely reported as present / Dubious taxon or junior synonym / Ichnotaxon / Ootaxon / Morphotaxon	Notes; Uncertain or tentative taxa are in small text; ~~crossed out~~ taxa are discredited.

The Tuchengzi Formation was deposited during a time of transition between the Daohugou Biota and the Jehol biota. The Tuchengzi represents a poorer, more arid climate that appears to have caused much of the Daohugou fauna to become extinct. They would later be replaced by the Jehol biota when conditions became more favorable to a diversity of terrestrial animal life.

=== Reptiles ===
Indeterminate sauropod remains formerly attributed to the Mamenchisauridae and Brachiosauridae have been found in Liaoning, China. Theropod tracks, including those made by avialans, have been found in Liaoning, China.

Genus	Species	County	Member	Abundance	Notes	Image
Orientognathus	O. chaoyangensis	Chaoyang, Liaoning.		"An incomplete skeleton (41HIII-0418)".	A rhamphorhynchid pterosaur.	
Chaoyangsaurus	C. youngi	Liaoning.		"Partial skull with mandible, cervicals, humerus, and scapula."	A basal ceratopsian.	
Grallator	Grallator isp.	Hebei			Footprints belonging to the Grallator form taxon, made by an unknown small theropod.	
Menglongipus	M. sinensis	Hebei			Footprints belonging to the Menglongipus sinensis form taxon, made by an unknown small (~65 cm long) deinonychosaur	

=== Crustaceans ===
Genus	Species	County	Member	Abundance	Notes	Image
Jurapingquania	C. sp.	Liaoning			A Clam shrimp	

=== Plants ===
Genus	Species	County	Member	Abundance	Notes	Images
Brachyoxylon	B. yanqingense	Yanqing District, Beijing.		Fossil wood.		
Xenoxylon	X. latiporosum	Yanqing District, Beijing.		Fossil wood.		
Xenoxylon	X. peidense	Yanqing District, Beijing.		Fossil wood.		

== See also ==
- List of dinosaur-bearing rock formations
