= Orientognathus =

Orientognathus Temporal range: Late Jurassic, 155 Ma

Scientific classification
- Kingdom: Animalia
- Phylum: Chordata
- Class: Reptilia
- Order: †Pterosauria
- Family: †Rhamphorhynchidae
- Genus: †Orientognathus; Lü et al., 2015
- Species: †O. chaoyangensis

Binomial name
- †Orientognathus chaoyangensis Lü et al., 2015

Genus of rhamphorhynchid pterosaur from the Middle Jurassic

Orientognathus is a genus of rhamphorhynchid pterosaur from the Late Jurassic of China. It is known from a single specimen which includes most of the skeleton and skull, and was first named and described in 2015 by Lü Junchang et al.. The taxon was found in the Upper Jurassic Tuchengzi Formation of China, which is slightly younger than the Tiaojishan Formation that most other Middle Jurassic pterosaurs from the region have been found in. The description study produced a phylogenetic analysis, which determined that Orientognathus was a basal member of Rhamphorhynchidae, possibly within Rhamphorhynchinae.
