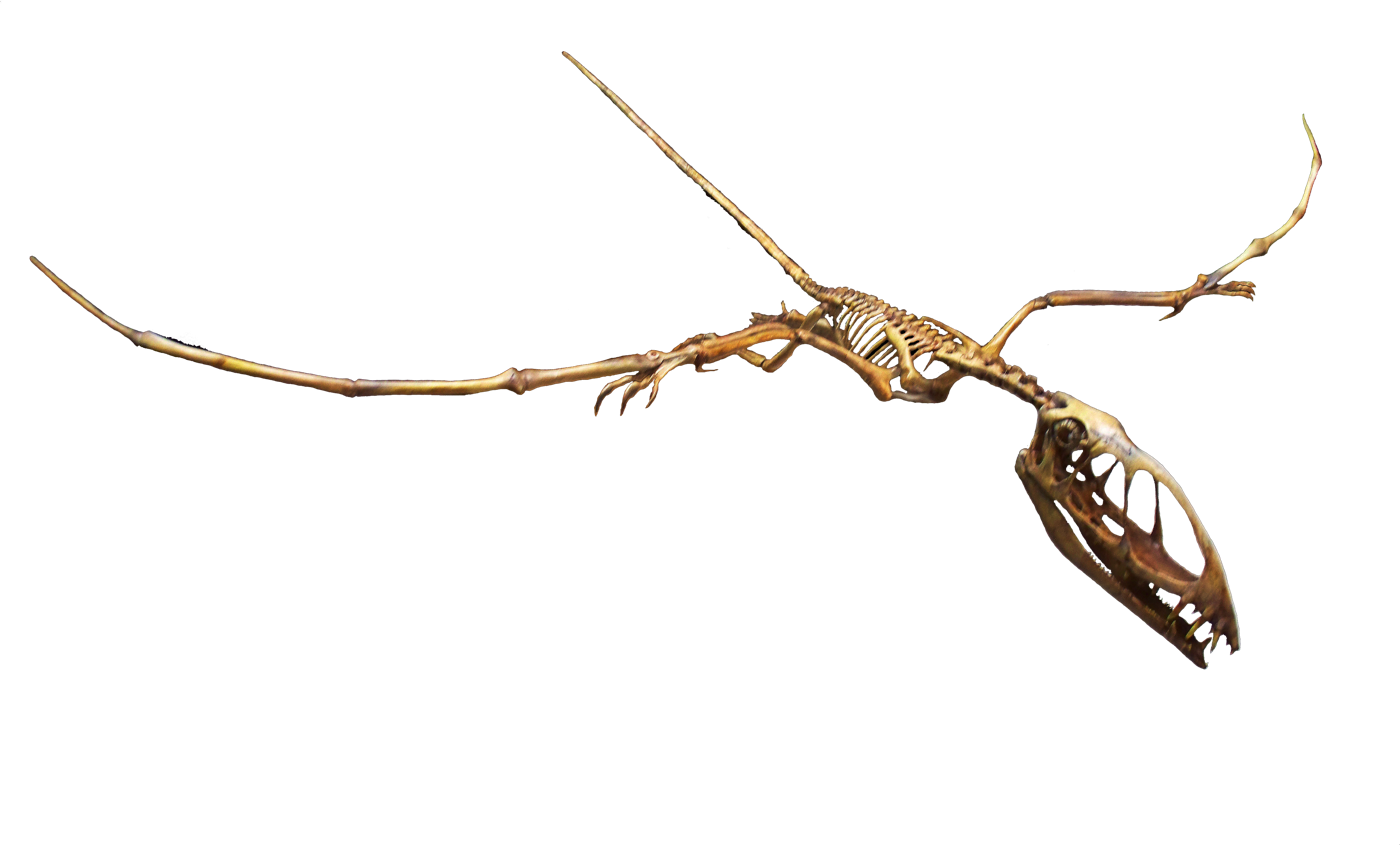
- Skeletal reconstruction of Dimorphodon macronyx, Rocky Mountain Dinosaur Resource Center

Scientific classification
- Kingdom: Animalia
- Phylum: Chordata
- Class: Reptilia
- Order: †Pterosauria
- Clade: †Macronychoptera
- Family: †Dimorphodontidae; Seeley, 1870

Genera
- †Allkaruen?; †Caelestiventus; †Dimorphodon; †Rhamphinion?

= Dimorphodontidae =

Dimorphodontids Temporal range: Late Triassic–Early Jurassic, 208–182 Ma

Family of basal macronychopteran pterosaurs

Dimorphodontidae (or dimorphodontids) is a group of early "rhamphorhynchoid" pterosaurs named after Dimorphodon, that lived in the Late Triassic to Early Jurassic. While fossils that can be definitively referred to the group are rare, dimorphodontids may have had a broad distribution, with fossils known from the UK, the southwest United States, and possibly Antarctica.

Dimorphodontidae was named in 1870 by Harry Govier Seeley (as "Dimorphodontae"), with Dimorphodon as the only known member. In 2003, David Unwin defined a clade Dimorphodontidae, as the group consisting of the last common ancestor of Dimorphodon macronyx and Peteinosaurus zambellii, and all its descendants. However, later studies found that Dimorphodon may not be closely related to Peteinosaurus, so this definition of Dimorphodontidae would therefore be superfluous.

In 2014, Brian Andres and colleagues defined another clade, Dimorphodontia, as a replacement for Dimorphodontidae. Dimorphodontia would include all pterosaurs more closely related to Dimorphodon than to Pterodactylus. According to the analysis published by Andres et al., Dimorphodontia is also a small group, including only Dimorphodon and Parapsicephalus.

In 2018, a close relative of Dimorphodon was described from the Late Triassic of North America by Britt and colleagues, and was named Caelestiventus. This discovery expanded the geographic, temporal and also the ecological range of dimorphodontids, as it was discovered in the Late Triassic Nugget Sandstone in Utah, which was a desert at the time. Britt and colleagues also redefined Dimorphodontidae as the least inclusive clade containing Dimorphodon macronyx and Caelestiventus hanseni.
