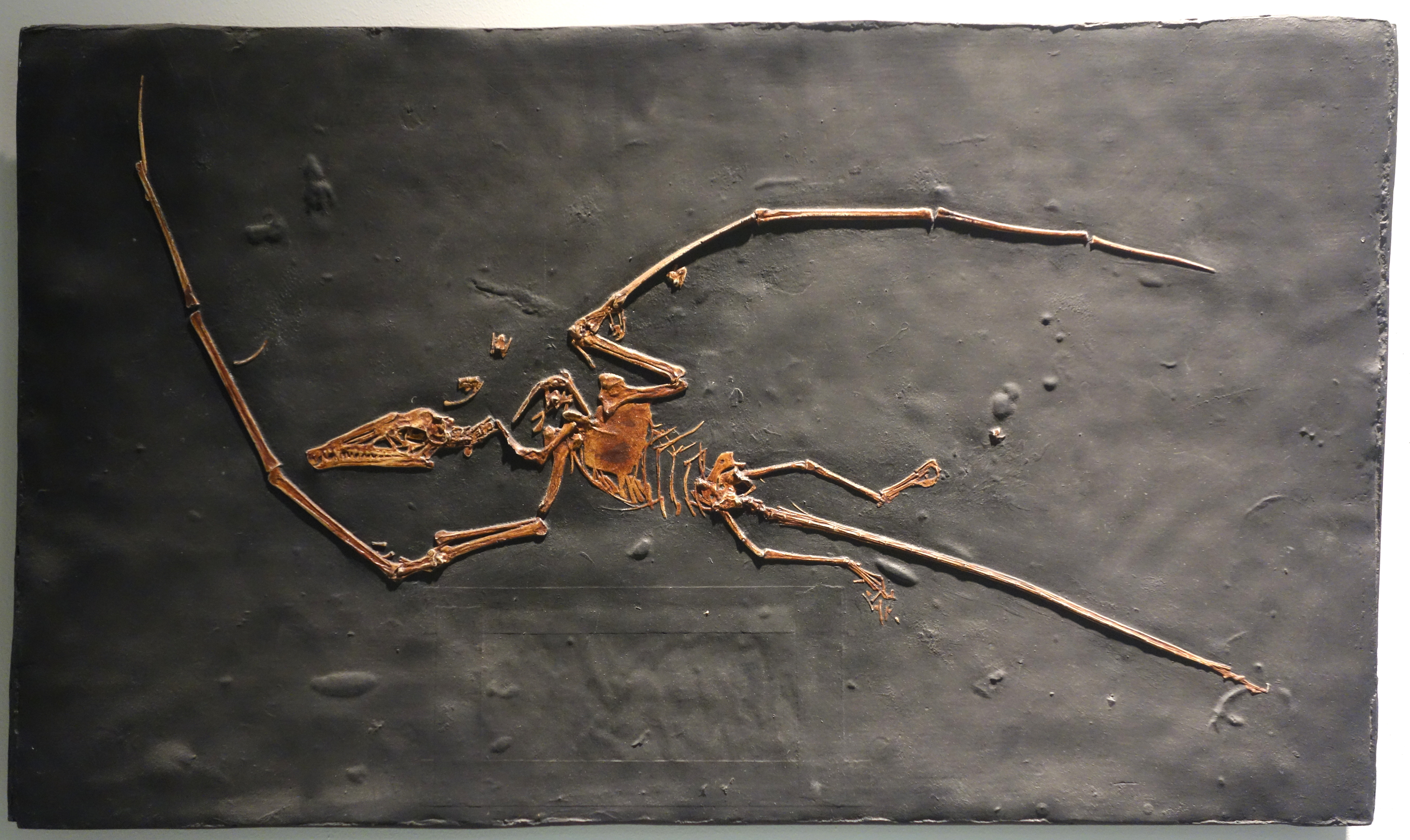
- Cast of the Pittsburgh C. liasicus specimen

Scientific classification
- Kingdom: Animalia
- Phylum: Chordata
- Class: Reptilia
- Order: †Pterosauria
- Clade: †Novialoidea
- Superfamily: †Campylognathoidea; Kuhn, 1967
- Family: †Campylognathoididae; Kuhn, 1967
- Subfamily: †Campylognathoidinae; Kuhn, 1967
- Genus: †Campylognathoides; Strand, 1928

Type species
- †Campylognathus zitteli Plieninger, 1894

Species
- †C. zitteli (Plieninger, 1894); †?C. indicus Jain, 1978; †C. liasicus (Quenstedt, 1858)

= Campylognathoides =

Campylognathoides Temporal range: Early Jurassic, 182 Ma

Genus of campylognathoidid pterosaur from the Early Jurassic

Campylognathoides is an extinct genus of pterosaur discovered in the Württemberg Lias deposits (dated to the early Toarcian age) of Germany; this first specimen, however, consisted only of wing fragments. Further better preserved specimens were found in the Holzmaden shale; based on these specimens, Felix Plieninger erected a new genus.

== Discovery ==
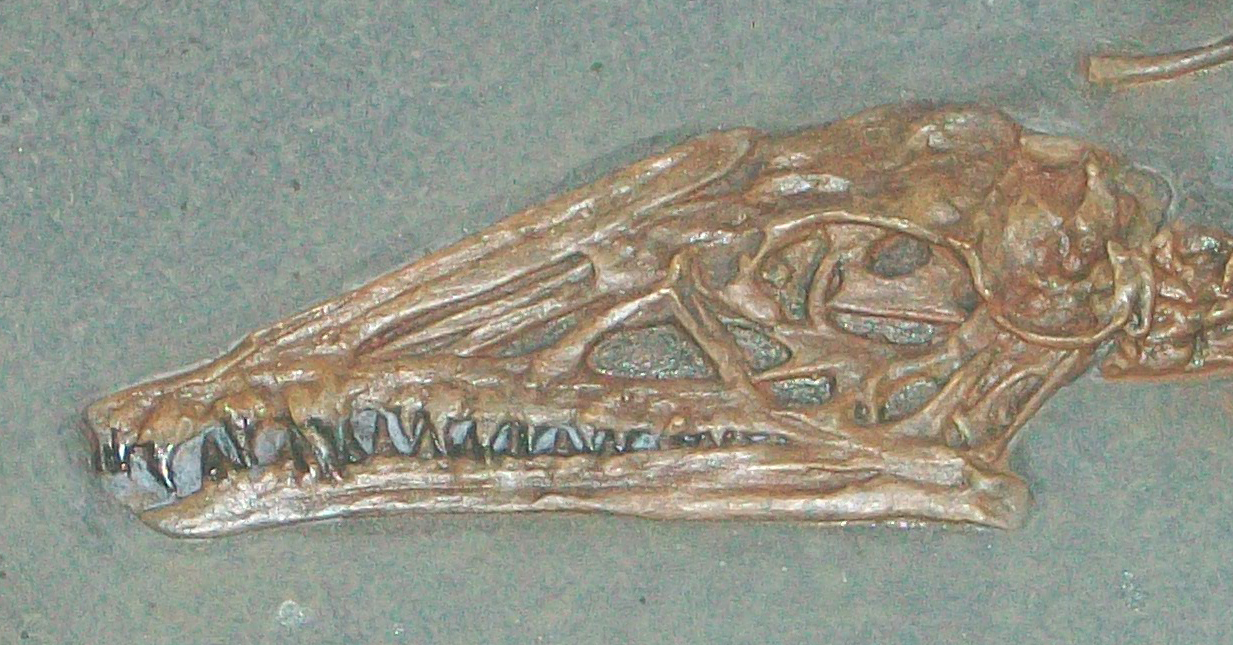
The skull of C. liasicus, part of a cast of a skeleton in the American Museum of Natural History

In 1858 Friedrich August Quenstedt named a new species of Pterodactylus: P. liasicus. It was based on a fossil, holotype GPIT 9533, consisting of some wing bones, found on the Wittberg near Metzingen in layers dating from the early Toarcian, about 180 million years old. The specific name referred to the Lias. Quenstedt thought he had identified long metacarpals in the wing, concluding that the new species was therefore not belonging to more basal genera, like the long-tailed Rhamphorhynchus.

In 1893 commercial fossil collector Bernhard Hauff sr. discovered a skeleton of a large pterosaur near Holzmaden. In 1894 Felix Plieninger based a new genus on this specimen: Campylognathus. The genus name is derived from Greek kampylos, "bent", and gnathos, "jaw", in reference to the bent lower jaw. The type species is Campylognathus zitteli. The specific name honours Alfred von Zittel. The holotype is SMNS 9787.

In 1897 Hauff prepared another specimen that eventually in 1903 was acquired by the Carnegie Museum of Natural History at Pittsburgh. This fossil, CM 11424, is due to its completeness the best source of information about the genus.

In 1901 Plieninger for the first time studied P. liasicus and discovered that Quenstedt had mistaken the, in reality short, metacarpal, for a coracoid, meaning it was a basal pterosaur. In 1906 Plieninger referred P. liasicus and the Pittsburgh specimen to Campylognathus, though not yet establishing the specific status of each of the three exemplars. In 1907 however, Plieninger recognised a second species of Campylognathus: C. liasicus, to which CM 11424 was referred also.

Norwegian entomologist Embrik Strand discovered in the 1920s that the name Campylognathus had previously been used for the African bug Campylognathus nigrensis, a genus of the Heteroptera named in 1890. As the name was thus preoccupied, he renamed the pterosaur Campylognathoides in 1928.

During the twentieth century new finds have brought the number of known specimens to about a dozen.

=== Species ===
Three species of Campylognathoides have been named:

- Campylognathoides zitteli (Plieninger, 1894) is the type species.

The larger Holzmaden Campylognathoides, C. zitteli (SMNS 9787), had a wingspan of 1.75 m (5 ft 9 in).

- Campylognathoides liasicus (Quenstedt, 1858 [originally Pterodactylus liasicus])

C. liasicus had a three foot wingspan, making it smaller than its Holzmaden contemporary, C. zitteli.

- "Campylognathoides" indicus Jain, 1974

C. indicus was described by Sohan Lal Jain on the basis of a fragment of jaw, ISI R. 48, recovered from Chanda district, India. Kevin Padian considers this a nomen dubium, possibly based on a fish fossil. That the Kota Formation in which it was found, has since been redated to the Middle Jurassic or later, seems to preclude any close connection to Campylognathoides, even if it were a pterosaur.

The distinction between C. liasicus and C. zitteli is problematical. Plieninger merely recognised the smaller species because he considered its fossil too poor in quality to refer other specimens to. However, in 1925 Swedish researcher Carl Wiman, studying specimen UUPM R157, concluded that a fundamental morphological difference could distinguish the two species: C. zitteli has a proportionally much longer wing. In 2008 however, Padian pointed out that this might well have been a matter of ontogenetic development, larger individuals growing extra large wings to limit the wing load. Other differences, such as the larger number of teeth in the lower jaw, a longer snout and nares, five instead of four sacrals, perpendicular sacral ribs and a longer leg, might conceivably also be size-related. Final proof could only be given by a continuous growth series, as previously has been done in the case of Rhamphorhynchus and Pterodactylus. Provisionally Padian kept distinguishing two species, but moved two specimens to C. zitteli: SMNS 51100 and GPIT 24470, because of their larger size and morphological similarities.

== Description ==
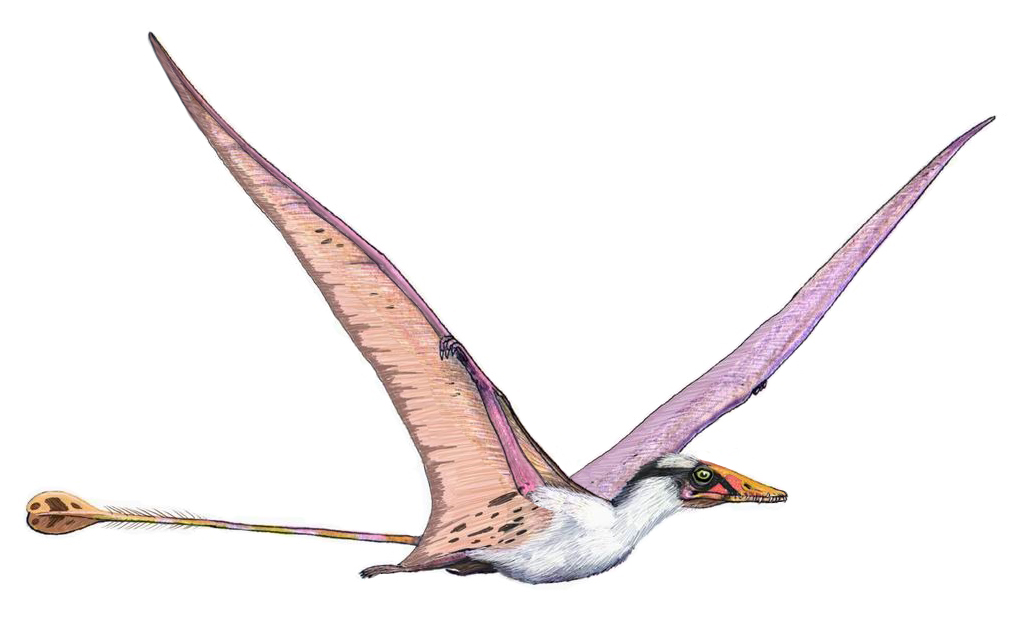
Restoration

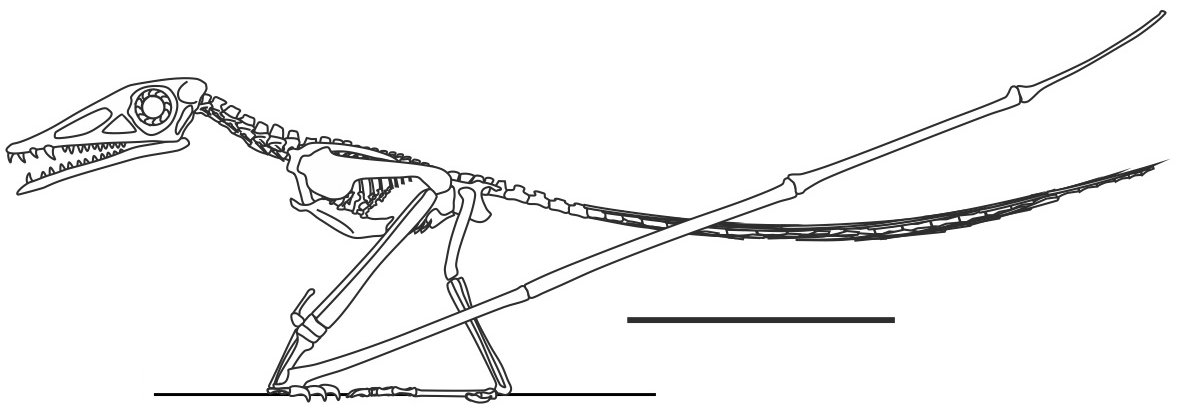
Skeletal restoration of C. liasicus

Compared to its contemporary from the same layers Dorygnathus, the snout on this genus is relatively short, though the skull is still in general elongated, be it much lighter built. The large eye sockets, placed low in the skull above a narrow jugal, have caused some researchers to speculate that Campylognathoides had especially acute vision, or possibly even a nocturnal lifestyle. The back of the skull is relatively high and flat, with a sudden downturn just in front of the eyes. The snout ends in a slender point curving a bit upwards at its very end. A large part of the snout is occupied by long bony nares. Below them a small triangular skull opening, the fenestra antorbitalis is present.

Reflecting the more shallow snout, the teeth of Campylognathoides are also short and not at all laniaries or fang-like as in the markedly heterodont Dorygnathus. They are conical and recurved but have a broad base with the point bevelled off from the inside forming a sharp and strong cutting surface. In the upper jaw there are four rather widely spaced teeth in the praemaxilla gradually increasing in size from the front to the back; the fourth pair of teeth is the largest. Behind them are ten smaller teeth in the maxilla, gradually decreasing posteriorly. In the lower jaw there are twelve to fourteen teeth present in C. liasicus, sixteen to nineteen in C. zitteli. The largest total number is thus 66.

According to a study by Kevin Padian there are eight cervical vertebrae, fourteen dorsals, four or five sacrals and up to 38 caudal vertebrae. The tail base is flexible with about six short vertebrae; behind them the caudals elongate and are stiffened by very long extensions allowing the tail to function as a rudder.

The sternum of Campylognathoides was a rather large rectangular plate of bone with a short forward-facing crest called a cristospina. The upper arm is short but robust with a square deltopectoral crest. The lower arm too is short but wing length is considerable due to the hand, which has short metacarpals but a very long wing finger for a basal pterosaur, of which the second phalanx is the largest. The pteroid is short and robust.

The pelvis is not very well known. A fossil collector found a well preserved Campylognathoides hip in a Braunschweig shale quarry in 1986. This pelvis, BSP 1985 I 87, proved to be scientifically significant because the hip socket was according to Peter Wellnhofer in an upward lateral position, preventing the animal from being able to orient its legs erectly like in dinosaurs, birds and mammals. This would prove that Campylognathoides was not well able to walk on its hind legs but must have walked quadrupedally. This gait posture has been confirmed in other "rhamphorhynchoids" (i.e. basal pterosaurs) as well. However, Padian in 2009 concluded the opposite, stating that an erected position was necessary to place the feet on the ground and that, though a quadrupedal gait was possible, a bipedal way of locomotion was a precondition for a fast gait. This subject remains highly controversial.

The leg is rather short and the feet are small. The fifth toe, often interpreted as carrying a membrane between the legs, is exceptionally short for a basal pterosaur.

== Classification ==
Plieninger in his later publications assigned Campylognathus to the "Rhamphorhynchoidea". As this suborder is a paraphyletic assemblage of not specially related basal pterosaurs, this classification merely states the negative fact that it was not a pterodactyloid. A positive determination was first attempted by Baron Franz Nopcsa who in 1928 assigned the genus to the subfamily Rhamphorhynchinae within the family Rhamphorhynchidae. After a period in which very little work was done on pterosaur systematics, in 1967 Oskar Kuhn placed Campylognathoides in its own subfamily within the Rhamphorhynchidae, the Campylognathoidinae. However, in 1974 Peter Wellnhofer concluded that it was placed in a more basal position in the phylogenetic tree, below the Rhamphorhynchidae. In the early twenty-first century this was confirmed by the first extensive exact cladistic analyses. In 2003 both David Unwin and Alexander Kellner introduced a clade Campylognathoididae; within Unwin's terminology this clade is the sister clade of the Breviquartossa within the Lonchognatha; applying Kellner's terminology it is the most basal offshoot within the Novialoidea. There is no material difference between the two positions.

According to the analyses Campylognathoides would be closely related to Eudimorphodon, to which it is similar in skull, sternum and humerus form. This was confirmed by Padian in 2009, though Padian also pointed out several basal features present in Eudimorphodon but lacking in Campylognathoides. In 2010 an analysis was published by Brian Andres showing that Eudimorphodon together with Austriadactylus formed a very basal clade, leaving Campylognathoides as the only known member of the Campylognathoididae. Other recent phylogenetic analyses confirm these results, and suggest that Campylognathoides is more derived than all Triassic-aged pterosaurs, as well as the Early Jurassic Dimorphodon and Parapsicephalus. Campylognathoides is the basalmost member of the Novialoidea which is defined as a node-based taxon consisting of the last common ancestor of Campylognathoides, Quetzalcoatlus and all its descendants.

== Paleobiology ==
In the past, some paleontologists thought Campylognathoides had a piscivorous lifestyle, while other paleontologists have suggested an alternative interpretation that it might have been a predator of small terrestrial animals, or that it had a fast aerial lifestyle comparable to those of falcons and mastiff bats. Direct dietary evidence based on gut contents suggests that Campylognathoides fed on a belemnoid cephalopod Clarkeiteuthis conocauda, indicating that it had a teuthophagous diet.

== See also ==
- List of pterosaur genera
- Timeline of pterosaur research
- Dorygnathus
- Holzmaden
- Rhamphorhynchus

== Sources ==
- Dinosaurs and other Prehistoric Creatures, edited by Ingrid Cranfield, 2000 Salamander Books Ltd pg 285–286.
- Quenstedt, F. A. 1858 "Ueber Pterodactylus liasicus", Jahreshefte des Vereins für vaterländische Naturkunde in Württemberg 14, 299–310 & pl. 2.
- Plieninger, F. 1907 "Die Pterosaurier der Juraformation Schwabens", Paläontographica 53, 209–313 & pls 14–19.
- Wellnhofer, P. 1974 "Campylognathoides liasicus (Quenstedt), an Upper Liassic pterosaur from Holzmaden – The Pittsburgh specimen", Ann. Carnegpterus. 45 (2), 5–34.
- Plieninger, F. 1894 "Campylognathus Zitteli, ein neuer Flugsaurier aus dem obersten Lias Schwabens", Paläontographica 41, 193–222 & pl. 19.
- Jain, 1974, "Jurassic Pterosaur from India", Journal of the Geological Society of India, vol.15, Pt.3 pp. 330–335
- Padian, K. 2009. The Early Jurassic Pterosaur Dorygnathus banthenis (Theodori, 1830) and The Early Jurassic Pterosaur Campylognathoides Strand, 1928, Special Papers in Palaeontology 80, Blackwell ISBN 978-1-4051-9224-8
