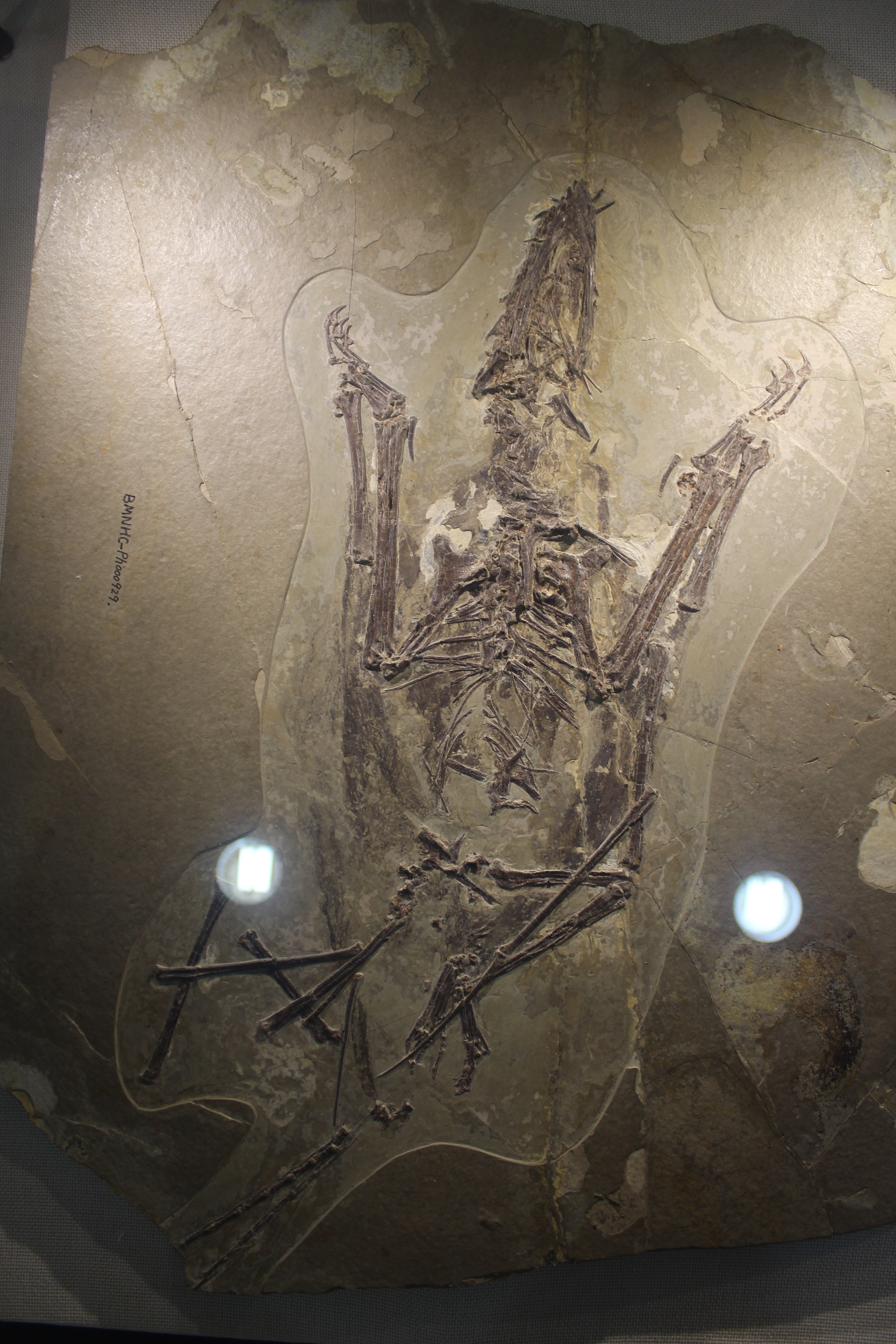
- Fossil specimen, Beijing Museum of Natural History

Scientific classification
- Kingdom: Animalia
- Phylum: Chordata
- Class: Reptilia
- Order: †Pterosauria
- Family: †Rhamphorhynchidae
- Genus: †Fenghuangopterus; Lü, Fucha & Chen, 2010
- Species: †F. lii

Binomial name
- †Fenghuangopterus lii Lü, Fucha & Chen, 2010

= Fenghuangopterus =

Fenghuangopterus Temporal range: Middle Jurassic, 160 Ma

Genus of rhamphorhynchid pterosaur from the Middle Jurassic

Fenghuangopterus is a genus of basal pterosaur that lived in northeastern China during the Middle Jurassic.

== Discovery and naming ==
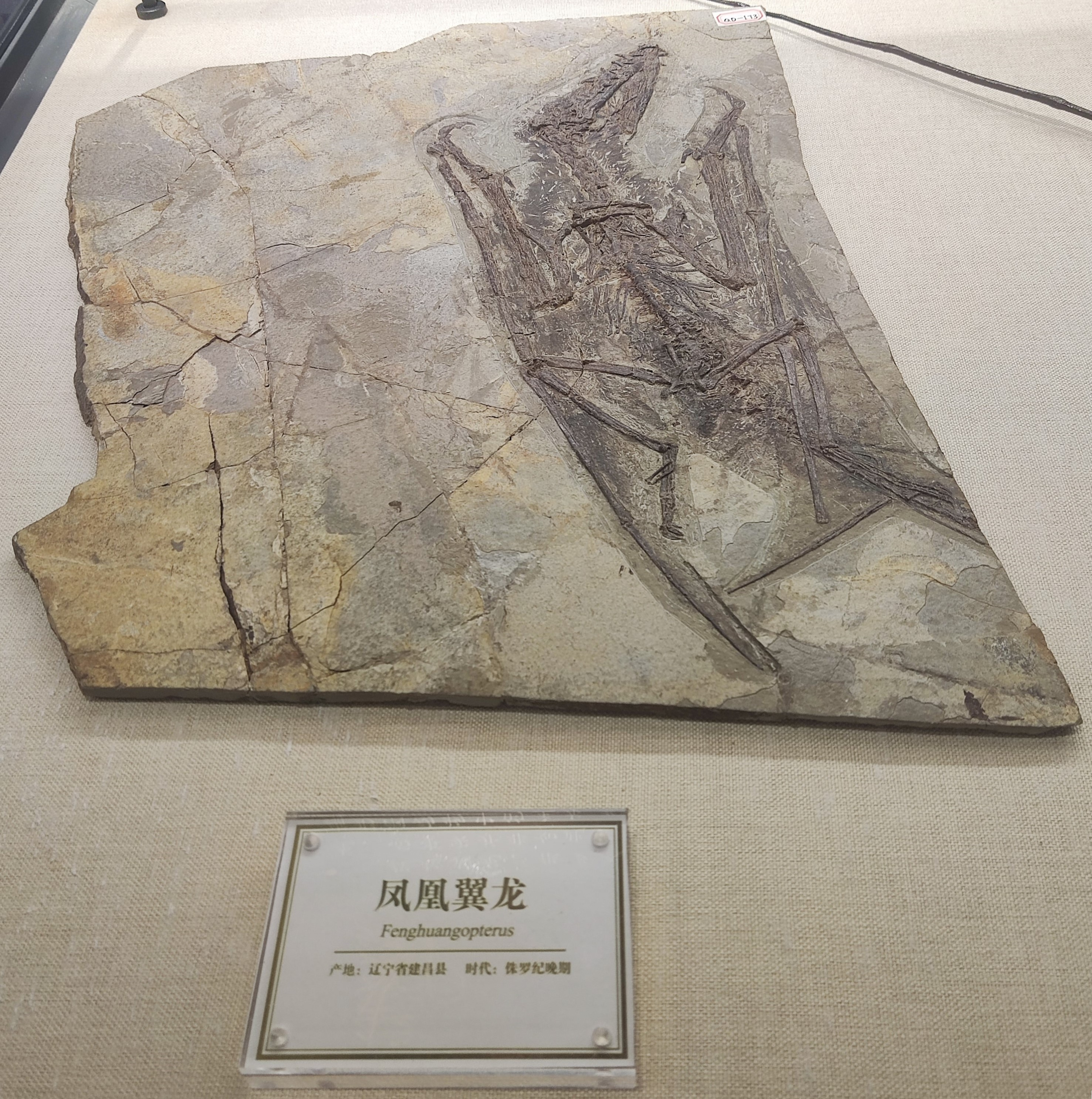
Fossil in Liaoning Palaeontological Museum

The type species Fenghuangopterus lii was in 2010 described and named by Lü Junchang et al. The generic name is derived from the Fenghuang Mountain and a Latinized Ancient Greek pteron, "wing". The specific name honors Li Xiumei, who donated the fossil. It is known from a single relatively complete, though badly crushed, fossil skeleton, holotype CYGB-0037, recovered from the Tiaojishan Formation of Liaoning Province, about 160 million years old.

== Description ==
Fenghuangopterus was similar to other scaphognathines in its short, blunt skull with a large antorbital fenestra, and widely spaced, vertically oriented teeth (as opposed to the horizontally-oriented teeth of other rhamphorhynchids). Like all known rhamphorhynchids its tail was stiffened by long vertebral extensions. The primary differences between Fenghuangopterus and other scaphognathines reside in its more numerous teeth — eleven in the upper jaw — which extended further back in the jaw than with its relatives, and its earlier time period.

== Classification ==
Fenghuangopterus is a member of the rhamphorhynchid subfamily Scaphognathinae, which had previously been known only from the Late Jurassic and includes the close relatives Scaphognathus, Sordes and Harpactognathus.

== See also ==
- List of pterosaur genera
- Timeline of pterosaur research
