= Mastiff bat =

The name mastiff bat is applied to certain species of the bat family Molossidae or so called free-tailed bats. It is usually applied specifically to the following genera:

- Eumops, mastiff bats or bonneted bats
- Mops (bat), greater mastiff bats, a genus of bats in the family Molossidae
- Promops, dome-palate mastiff bats
- Chaerephon (bat), lesser mastiff bats

and sometimes more loosely to the rest of the family.
