= Qinglongopterus =

Qinglongopterus Temporal range: Middle to Late Jurassic, 159 Ma

Scientific classification
- Kingdom: Animalia
- Phylum: Chordata
- Class: Reptilia
- Order: †Pterosauria
- Family: †Rhamphorhynchidae
- Subfamily: †Rhamphorhynchinae
- Genus: †Qinglongopterus; Lü et al., 2012
- Species: †Q. guoi

Binomial name
- †Qinglongopterus guoi Lü et al., 2012

Genus of rhamphorhynchid pterosaur from the Late Jurassic

Qinglongopterus is a genus of rhamphorhynchid pterosaur from the Middle/Upper Jurassic of Mutoudeng, Qinglong County, Hebei Province, China. Qinglongopterus is known from only one specimen; D3080/3081, a nearly complete skeleton collected from the Tiaojishan Formation. It was described by Lü Junchang et al. in 2012. The type species is Qinglongopterus guoi.

== Description ==
Qinglongopterus is noted to be remarkably similar to Rhamphorhynchus, although Qinglongopterus has a proportionally smaller head and shorter wings. In the original description, the authors suggest Rhamphorhynchus may even be descended from Qinglongopterus due to the large number of shared characters between the two genera. Qinglongopterus appears approximately 10 million years earlier than Rhamphorhynchus, yet possesses many derived traits for the group. This may be evidence of evolutionary stasis within rhamphorhynchine pterosaurs.

The holotype specimen has large eye sockets and exhibits a relative lack of fusion throughout the skeleton, suggesting the individual was a late-stage juvenile. The holotype has an estimated wingspan of 34.4 centimeters (13.5 inches).

== See also ==
- List of pterosaur genera
- Timeline of pterosaur research
