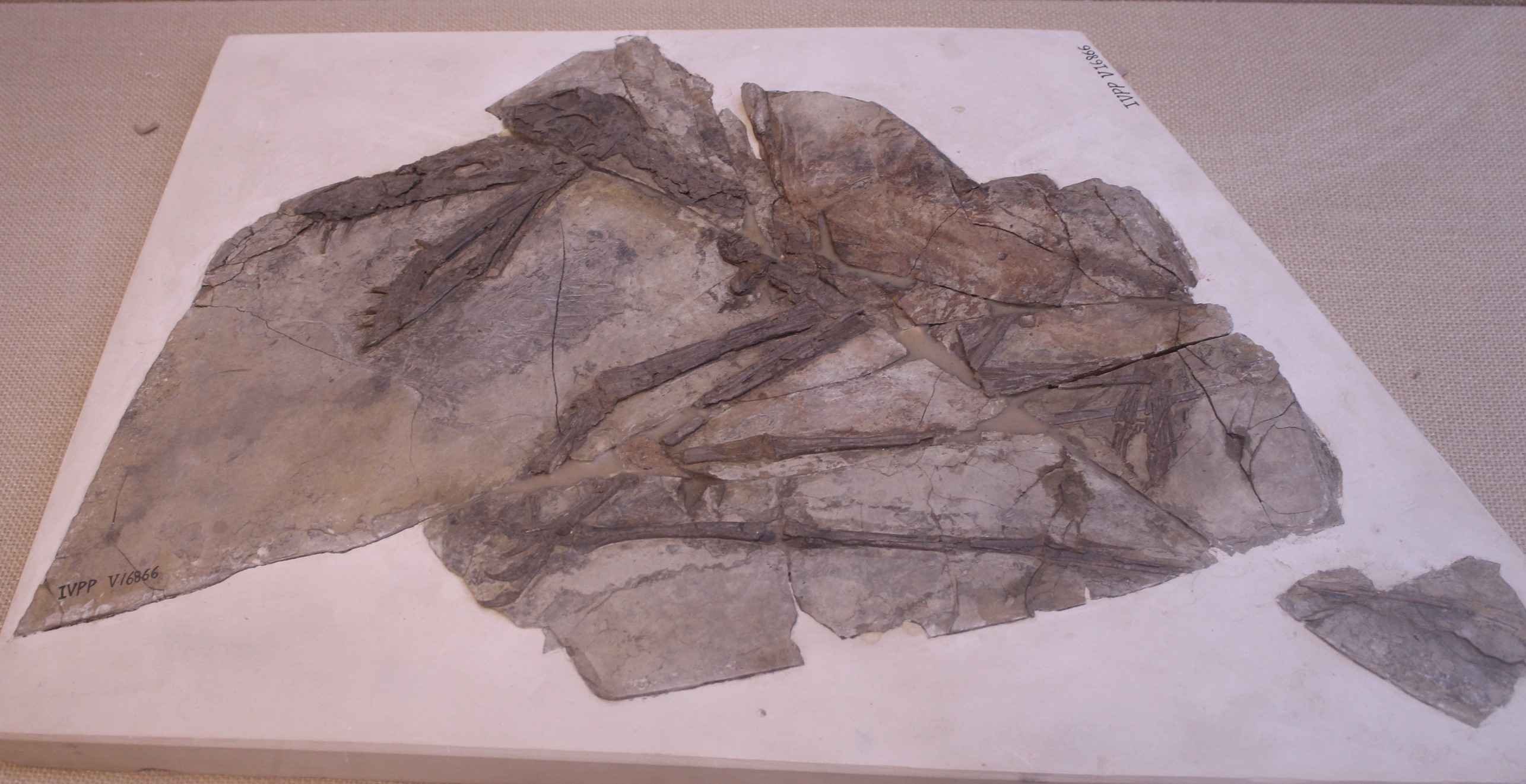
- Holotype, Paleozoological Museum of China

Scientific classification
- Kingdom: Animalia
- Phylum: Chordata
- Class: Reptilia
- Order: †Pterosauria
- Family: †Rhamphorhynchidae
- Subfamily: †Rhamphorhynchinae
- Genus: †Jianchangnathus; Cheng et al., 2012
- Species: †J. robustus

Binomial name
- †Jianchangnathus robustus Cheng et al, 2012

= Jianchangnathus =

Jianchangnathus Temporal range: Middle Jurassic, 160 Ma

Genus of rhamphorhynchid pterosaur from the Middle Jurassic

Jianchangnathus is an extinct genus of basal pterosaur from the Middle Jurassic Tiaojishan Formation of northeastern China.

== Naming ==
Jianchangnathus was first described and named by Cheng Xin, Wang Xiaolin, Jiang Shunxing and Alexander W.A. Kellner in 2012 and the type species is Jianchangnathus robustus. The generic name combines a reference to Jianchang County with a Greek γνάθος, gnathos, "jaw". The specific name means "robust" in Latin.

Jianchangnathus was initially described based on a single fossil skeleton, holotype IVPP V16866, recovered near Linglongta, in Jianchang County. The second specimen, PMOL-AP00028, consisting of a partially articulated skull and fragments of postcranial skeleton of a subadult individual, was described in 2014.

== Description ==
Autapomorphies of Jiangchangnathus include: a convex top margin of the lower jaw; a large front branch of the jugal; and the first three pairs of teeth of the lower jaws pointing strongly forwards. Its describers found it to share several features with Scaphognathus, including a high front end of the lower jaws, a pear-shaped lower temporal fenestra with the broad end below and teeth in the maxilla of the upper jaw that have a space equal to that of three toothsockets between them. Additionally, undescribed fossils of a pterosaur referred to Jianchangnathus suggest that the color of its pycnofibers was brown.

== Phylogeny ==
Jianchangnathus was assigned by the describers to the Scaphognathidae by the describing authors, which was corroborated by later phylogenetic analyses which included this taxon.

== See also ==
- List of pterosaur genera
- Timeline of pterosaur research
