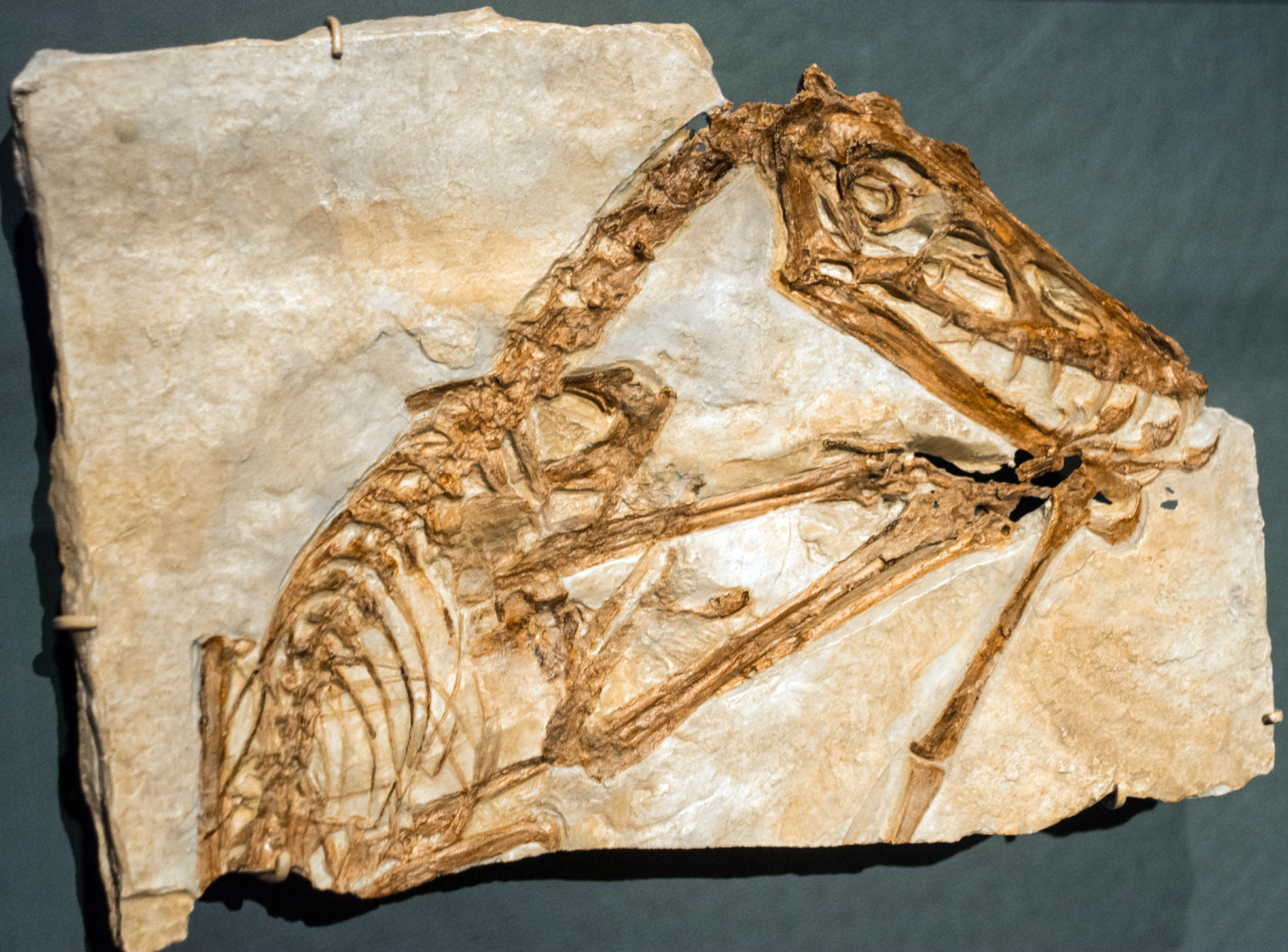
- Cast of the holotype specimen

Scientific classification
- Kingdom: Animalia
- Phylum: Chordata
- Class: Reptilia
- Order: †Pterosauria
- Family: †Rhamphorhynchidae
- Subfamily: †Rhamphorhynchinae
- Genus: †Scaphognathus; Wagner, 1861

Type species
- †Pterodactylus crassirostris Goldfuss, 1831

Species
- †Scaphognathus crassirostris (Goldfuss, 1831)

Synonyms
- Pachyramphus Fitzinger, 1843 (preoccupied); Brachytrachelus Giebel, 1850 (preoccupied); Pterodactylus crassirostris Goldfuss 1830; Pachyrhamphus crassirostris Fitzinger 1843 preoccupied; Ornithocephalus crassirostris Wagner 1851; Brachytrachelus crassirostris Giebel 1852 preoccupied; Rhamphorhynchus crassirostris Wagner 1858

= Scaphognathus =

Scaphognathus Temporal range: Late Jurassic, 155.7–150.8 Ma

Genus of rhamphorhynchid pterosaur from the Late Jurassic

Scaphognathus was a pterosaur that lived around Germany during the Late Jurassic. It had a wingspan of 0.9 m (3 ft).

== Discovery and naming ==
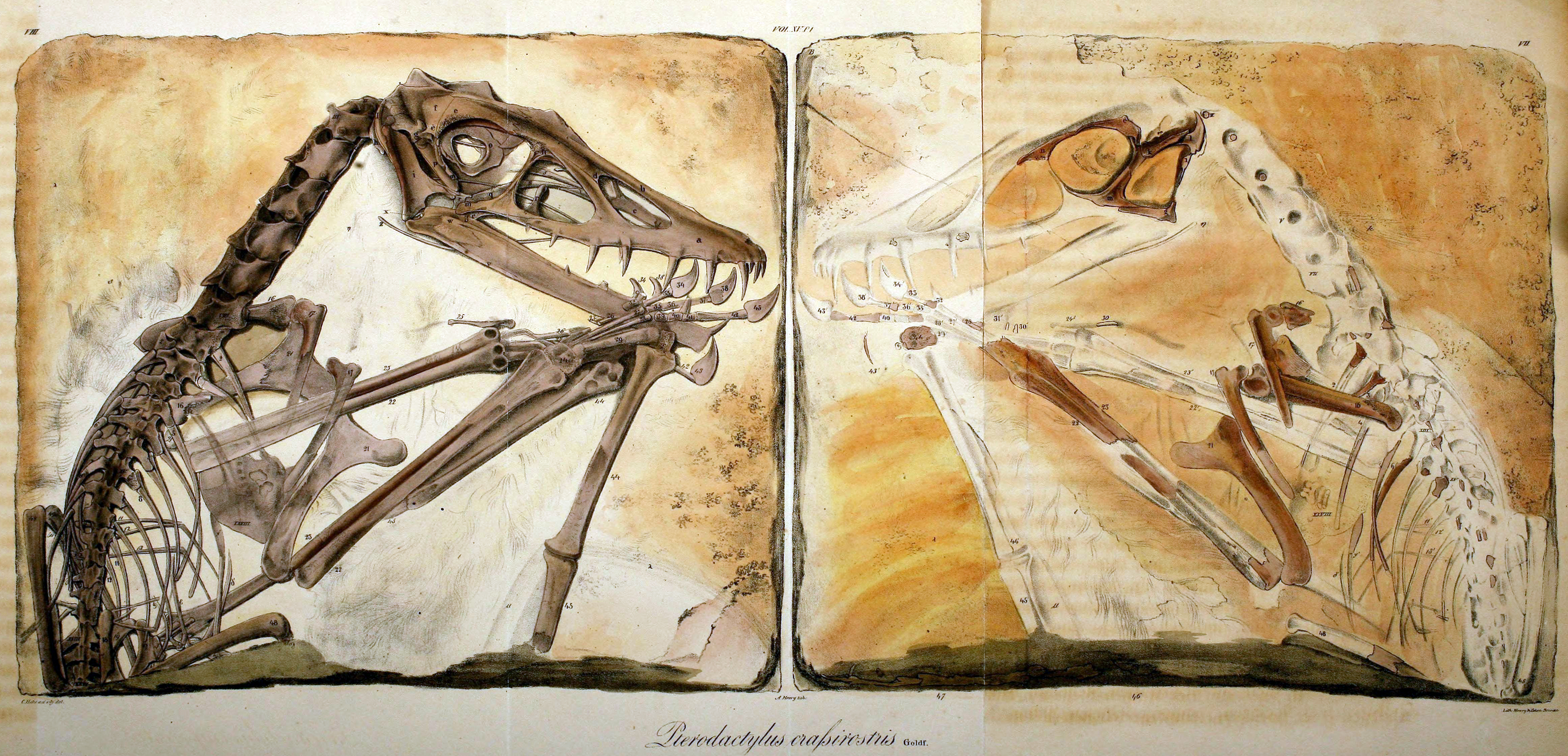
1831 illustration of the holotype slabs

The first known Scaphognathus specimen was described in 1831 by August Goldfuss who mistook the tailless specimen for a new Pterodactylus species: P. crassirostris. The specific name means "fat snout" in Latin. This specimen was an incomplete adult with a 0.9 m (3 ft) wingspan recovered from the Solnhofen strata near Eichstätt. In 1858 Johann Wagner referred the species to Rhamphorhynchus. After recognising the fundamentally different snout shape, Wagner, after previous failed attempts by Leopold Fitzinger and Christoph Gottfried Andreas Giebel, who used preoccupied names, in 1861 named a distinct genus: Scaphognathus, derived from Greek skaphe, "boat" or "tub", and gnathos, "jaw", in reference to the blunt shape of the lower jaws.

In the early twentieth century, the "rhamphorhynchoid" nature of S. crassirostris was recognized after the discovery of the second specimen in Mühlheim, whose long tail was preserved. The second Scaphognathus specimen was more complete than its predecessor, but only half the size (twenty inch wingspan) and with partially ossified bones. These characters indicate that the second specimen was a juvenile.

== Description ==
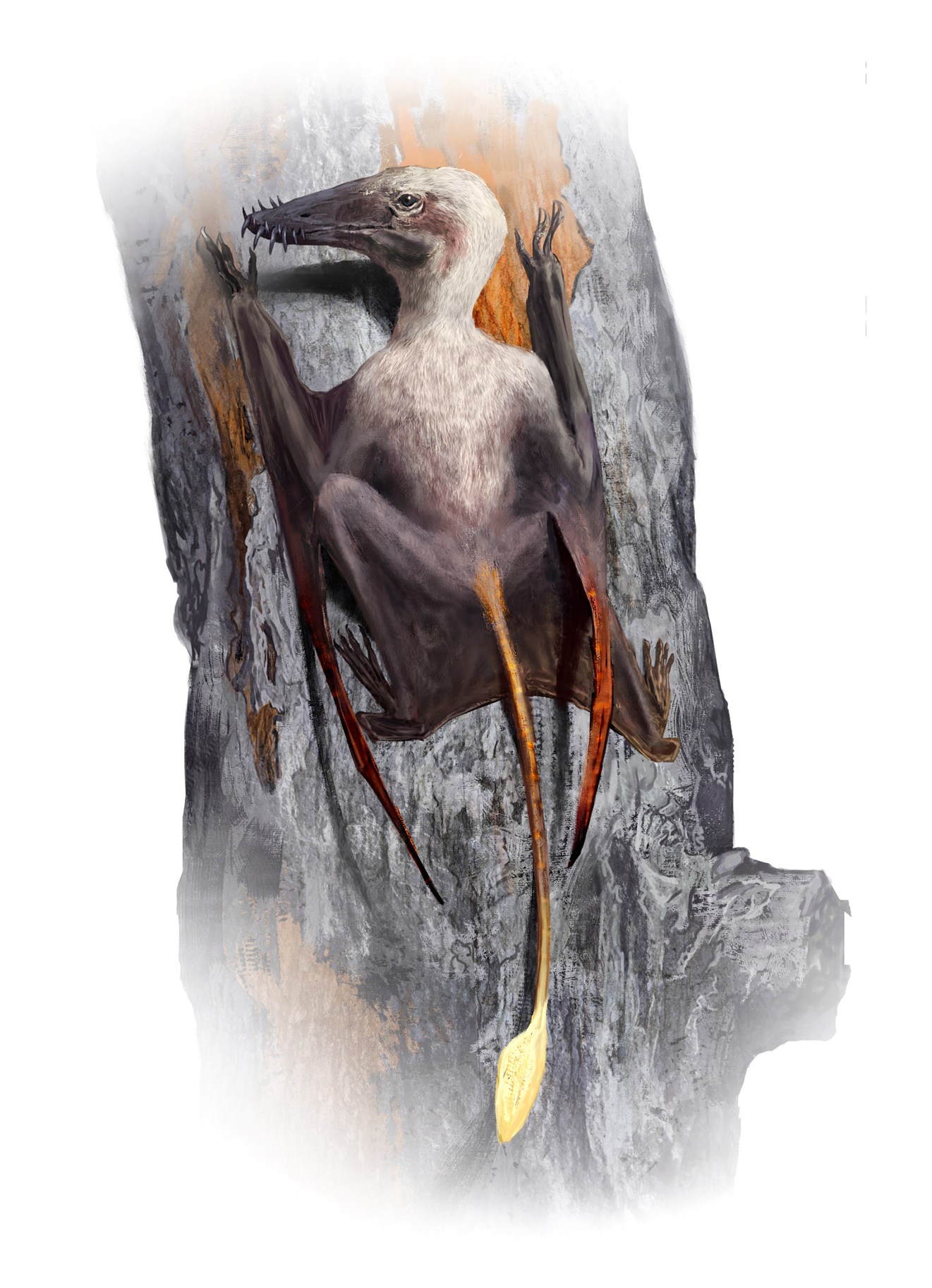
Life restoration exhibiting scansorial behavior

The Scaphognathus is known from three specimens, all of which originated in the Kimmeridgian-age Solnhofen Limestone. Physically it was very similar to Rhamphorhynchus, albeit with notable cranial differences.

For one, Scaphognathus had a proportionately shorter skull (4.5 in) with a blunter tip and a larger antorbital fenestra. Its teeth oriented vertically rather than horizontally. The traditional count of them held that eighteen teeth were in the upper jaws and ten in the lower. S. Christopher Bennett, studying a new third specimen, SMNS 59395, in 2004 determined there were only sixteen teeth in the upper jaws, the higher previous number having been caused by incorrectly adding replacement teeth.

Comparisons between the scleral rings of Scaphognathus and modern birds and reptiles suggest that it may have been diurnal. This may also indicate niche partitioning with contemporary pterosaurs inferred to be nocturnal, such as Ctenochasma and Rhamphorhynchus.

== Classification ==
The cladogram (family tree) of rhamphorhynchids below is the result of a large phylogenetic analysis published by Andres & Myers in 2013.

- Breviquartossa
  - Rhamphorhynchidae
    - - Scaphognathus crassirostris
    - Rhamphorhynchinae
      - Dorygnathus banthensis
      - - - Cacibupteryx caribensis
          - Nesodactylus hesperius
          - Rhamphorhynchus muensteri
        - - Harpactognathus gentryii
          - - Angustinaripterus longicephalus
            - Sericipterus wucaiwanensis

== See also ==
- List of pterosaur genera
- Timeline of pterosaur research
- Solnhofen limestone

== Literature ==
- Fantastic Facts About Dinosaurs (ISBN 0-7525-3166-2)
