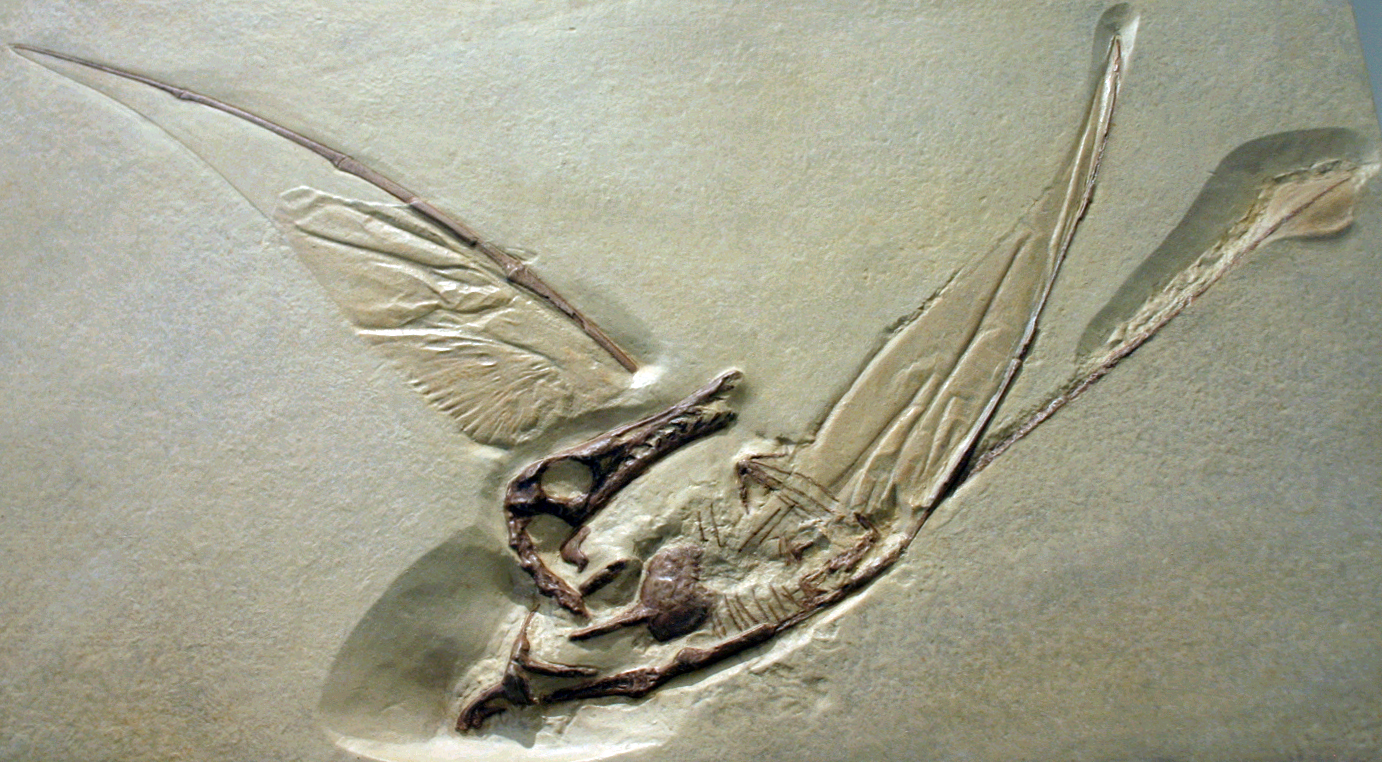
- Fossil specimen of Rhamphorhynchus

Scientific classification
- Kingdom: Animalia
- Phylum: Chordata
- Class: Reptilia
- Order: †Pterosauria
- Clade: †Novialoidea
- Clade: †Breviquartossa; Unwin, 2003
- Family: †Rhamphorhynchidae; Seeley, 1870

Type species
- †Pterodactylus longicaudus Münster, 1839

Subgroups
- †Dolicorhamphus; †Harpactognathus; †Klobiodon; †Parapsicephalus; †Rhamphorhynchinae; †Bellubrunnus; †Cacibupteryx; †Dorygnathus; †Nesodactylus; †Orientognathus; †Qinglongopterus; †Rhamphorhynchus; †Angustinaripterini; †Angustinaripterus; †Dearc; †Sericipterus; †Scaphognathinae; †Fenghuangopterus; †Jianchangnathus; †Jianchangopterus; †Scaphognathus; †Sordes?

Synonyms
- Scaphognathidae Hooley, 1913

= Rhamphorhynchidae =

Rhamphorhynchids Temporal range: Early-Late Jurassic, 182–148.5 Ma

Family of breviquartossan pterosaurs from the Jurassic period

Rhamphorhynchidae is a group of early pterosaurs named after Rhamphorhynchus, that lived in the Late Jurassic. The family Rhamphorhynchidae was named in 1870 by Harry Govier Seeley. Members of the group possess no more than 11 pairs of teeth in the rostrum, a deltopectoral crest that is constricted at the base but expanded at the distal end, and a bent phalange on the fifth toe.

Rhamphorhynchidae traditionally contains two subfamilies: the Rhamphorhynchinae and the Scaphognathinae. While not recovered as distinct clades by all analyses, there do appear to be traits uniting members of each group. Rhamphorhynchines are more common, were lightly built, and had jaws ending in pointed tips that contained more teeth, which are often procumbent (pointed forward). Scaphognathines are comparatively quite rare, were more robust skeletally, and had shorter wing proportions. The broad-tipped skulls of scaphognathines held fewer teeth which were widely spaced and vertically oriented in the jaw.

== Classification ==
The cladogram (family tree) of rhamphorhynchids below is the result of a large phylogenetic analysis published by Andres & Myers in 2013. Note that this study does not recover Scaphognathinae.

- Rhamphorhynchidae
  - - Scaphognathus crassirostris
  - Rhamphorhynchinae
    - Dorygnathus banthensis
    - - - Cacibupteryx caribensis
        - Nesodactylus hesperius
        - Rhamphorhynchus muensteri
      - - Harpactognathus gentryii
        - - Angustinaripterus longicephalus
          - Sericipterus wucaiwanensis
