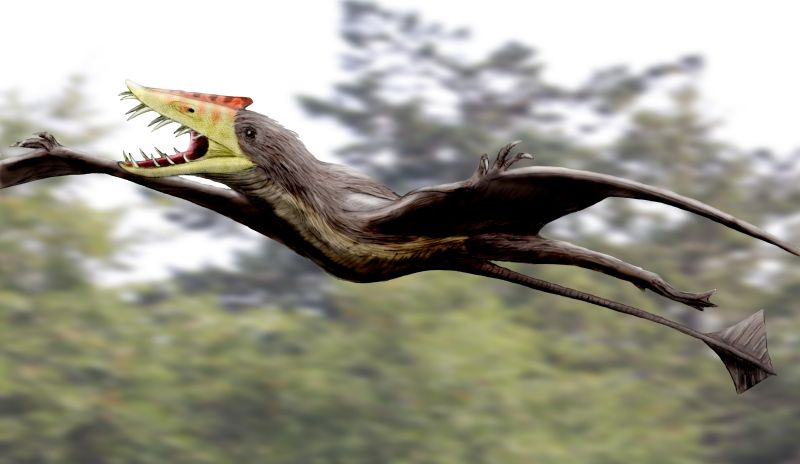
- Restoration

Scientific classification
- Domain: Eukaryota
- Kingdom: Animalia
- Phylum: Chordata
- Order: †Pterosauria
- Family: †Rhamphorhynchidae
- Genus: †Sericipterus; Andres et al., 2010
- Species: †S. wucaiwanensis

Binomial name
- †Sericipterus wucaiwanensis Andres et al., 2010

= Sericipterus =

Sericipterus Temporal range: Oxfordian, 160 Ma

Genus of rhamphorhynchid pterosaur from the Late Jurassic

Sericipterus is an extinct genus of rhamphorhynchid pterosaur. It is known from the Late Jurassic (early Oxfordian age) Shishugou Formation in Xinjiang, China.

== Etymology ==
The genus was named and described in 2010 by Brian Andres, James Matthew Clark and Xu Xing. The type species is Sericipterus wucaiwanensis. The generic name is derived from the Latin sericum, "silk", a reference to the Silk Route, and from a Latinized Greek pteron, "wing". The specific name refers to the Wucaiwan area, itself meaning "five-color bay" because of the many-colored layers.

== Description ==
The holotype specimen, IVPP V14725, consists of partly crushed, disarticulated bones that are largely preserved three-dimensionally. The wingspan has been estimated to have been at least 1.73 meters (5.7 ft). The skull of Sericipterus is similar to those of the "rhamphorhynchoids" (i.e. basal pterosaurs) Angustinaripterus and Harpactognathus. It had three bony crests: a low crest on the snout, a short low parietal crest on top of the skull and a short traverse crest connected to the front edge of the latter. The parietal crest is the first reported for a non-pterodactyloid pterosaur. The same is true for the rosette, bearing two pairs of forward pointing laniaries, formed by a narrowing of the snout behind these long fangs. Another probably five pairs of teeth were present in a more posterior position in the upper jaws. The number in the lower jaw is unknown. Except for the first rather straight pair, the teeth were recurved, sharply pointed, covered with smooth enamel and circular in cross-section but equipped with two keels providing cutting edges.

== Classification ==
Sericipterus has, after a comprehensive cladistic analysis of the Pterosauria, been placed as the sister taxon of Angustinaripterus in the Rhamphorhynchinae, a clade which also includes other large-bodied "rhamphorhynchoids", living inland as predators of small tetrapods and preserved in terrestrial sediments.

== See also ==
- List of pterosaur genera
- Timeline of pterosaur research
