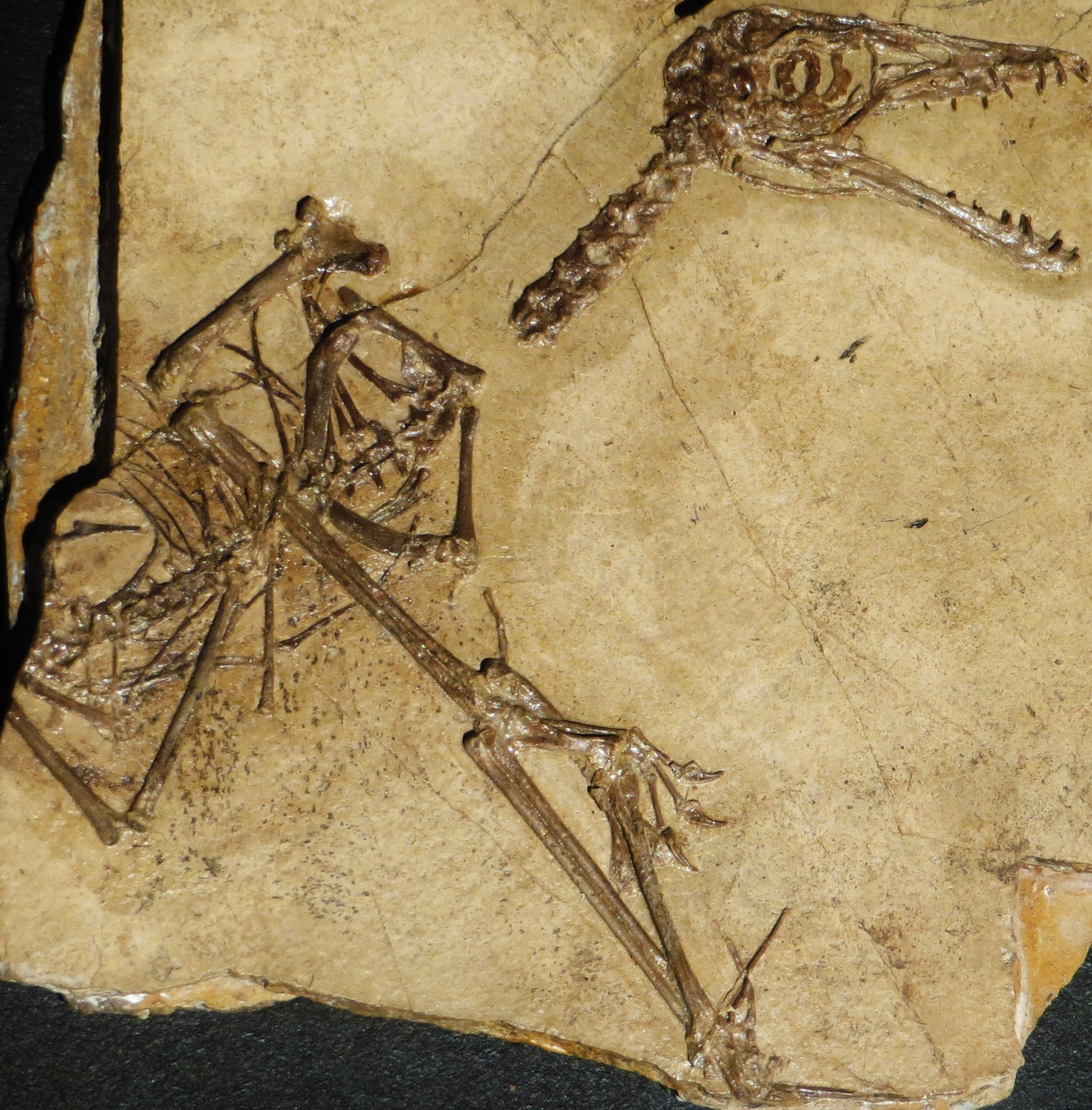
- Fossil specimen

Scientific classification
- Kingdom: Animalia
- Phylum: Chordata
- Class: Reptilia
- Order: †Pterosauria
- Clade: †Breviquartossa
- Genus: †Sordes; Sharov, 1971

Type species
- †Sordes pilosus Sharov, 1971

= Sordes =

Sordes Temporal range: Late Jurassic, 155.7 Ma

Genus of Late Jurassic pterosaur

Sordes is a genus of small pterosaur from the late Jurassic (Oxfordian/Kimmeridgian) Karabastau Svita of Kazakhstan.

This genus was named in 1971 by Aleksandr Grigorevich Sharov. The type species is Sordes pilosus. The genus name is Latin for "filth" or "scum"; but Sharov translates it as "nechist", which means "devil" or "evil spirit", so the intended translation is "hairy devil" (the specific name is Latin for "hairy"; despite sordes being feminine, it has not yet been emended to pilosa).

== Discovery ==
Sordes is based on the holotype PIN 2585/3, which consists of a crushed relatively complete skeleton on a slab. It was found in the 1960s at the foothills of the Karatau in Kazakhstan.

Sharov had already referred a paratype or second specimen: PIN 2470/1, again a fairly complete skeleton on a slab. By 2003 another six specimens had been discovered.

== Description ==
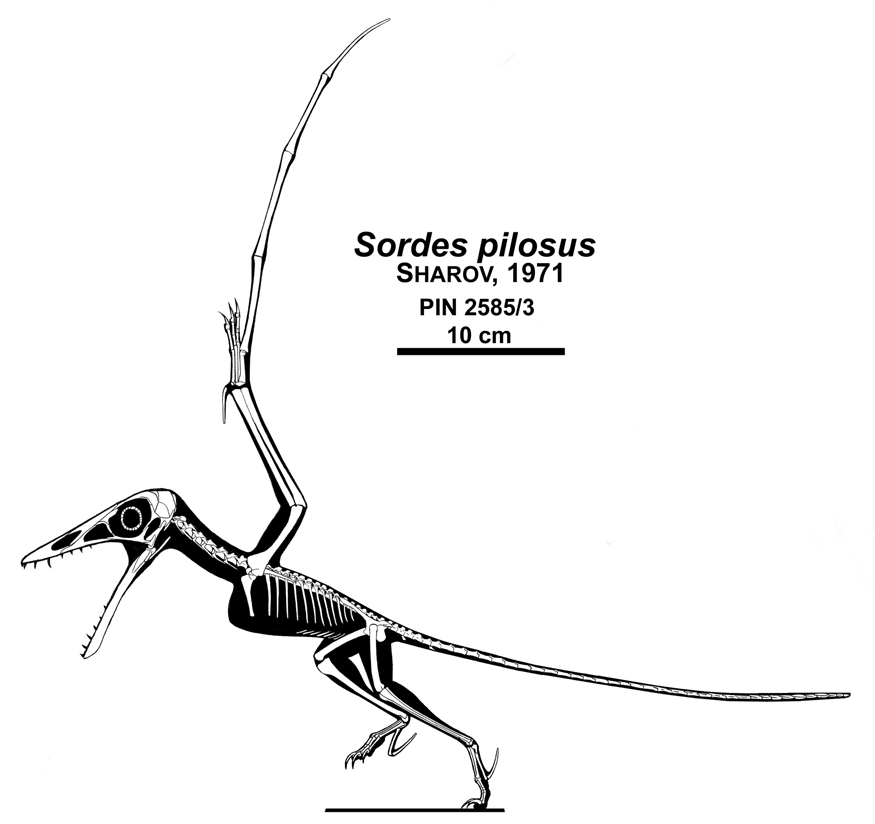
Skeletal reconstruction of the holotype PIN 2585/3

Sordes had a 0.63 m (2 ft) wingspan. The wings were relatively short. Sordes had, according to Sharov and Unwin, wing membranes attached to the legs and a membrane between the legs. It had a short neck. It had a long tail, accounting for over half its length, with at the end an elongated vane.

=== Skull and dentition ===
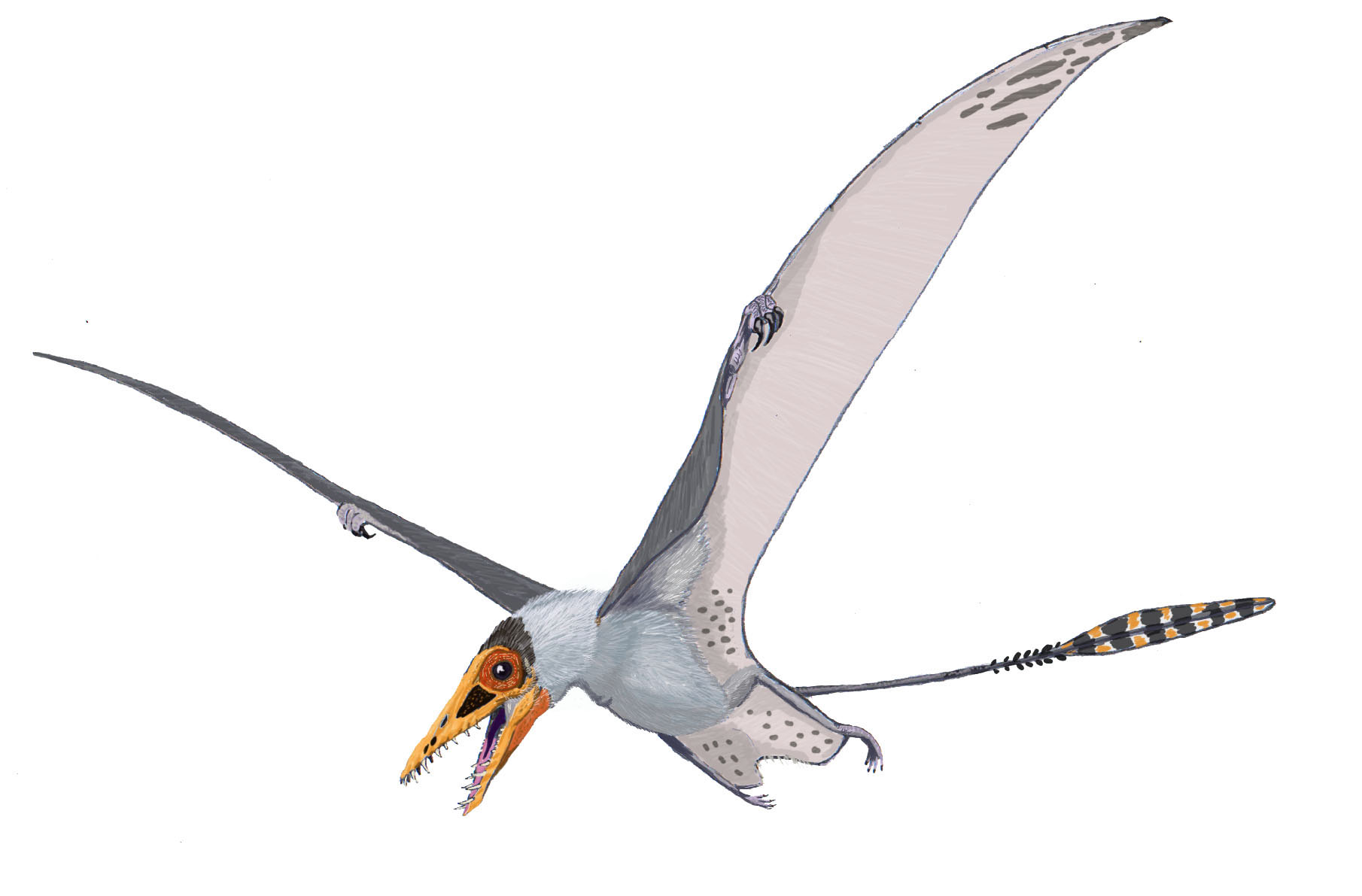
Life restoration

It had a slender, not round, head with moderately long, pointed jaws. The skull was about 8 cm (3.2 in) long. Unlike many pterosaurs, it had no head crest. The teeth in the frontal half of the jaws are large and pointed to facilitate prey capture. The teeth beyond these in the rear half of the jaw are much smaller and more numerous than those at the front, suggesting that they were more for crushing. Together these two types of teeth indicate specialisation for prey that was difficult to catch yet required some effort to eat. Likely contenders are invertebrates with tougher exoskeletons, or amphibians that were slippery to catch and then required some crunching before they could be swallowed.

=== Pycnofibers ===
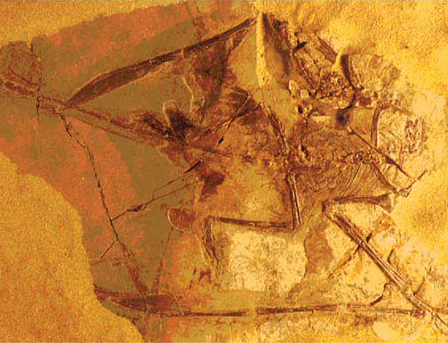
Holotype specimen

The fossil shows remains of the soft parts, such as membranes and hair-like filaments. This was the first unequivocal proof that pterosaurs had a layer of hair-like filaments covering their bodies, later named pycnofibres. The pycnofibres served as insulation, an indication the group was warm-blooded, and provided a streamlined flight profile. The pycnofibres are present in two main types: longer at the extreme part of the wing membrane and shorter near the body. In the 1990s, David Unwin argued that both types were essentially not hairs but reinforcing fibres of the flight membranes. Later he emphasized that "hair" in the form of pycnofibres was indeed present on the body, after the find of new specimens clearly showing this.

== Classification ==
Sordes has been assigned to the family Rhamphorhynchidae. These were among the earliest of the pterosaurs, evolving in the late Triassic and surviving to the late Jurassic. According to Unwin, within Rhamphorhynchidae Sordes belonged to the Scaphognathinae. Other researchers however, such as Alexander Kellner and Lü Junchang, have produced cladistic analyses showing that Sordes was much more basal, and not a rhamphorhynchid.

== See also ==
- List of pterosaur genera
- Timeline of pterosaur research
