= Cacibupteryx =

Cacibupteryx Temporal range: Late Jurassic, 156 Ma

Scientific classification
- Domain: Eukaryota
- Kingdom: Animalia
- Phylum: Chordata
- Order: †Pterosauria
- Family: †Rhamphorhynchidae
- Subfamily: †Rhamphorhynchinae
- Genus: †Cacibupteryx; Gasparini, Fernández, & de la Fuente, 2004

Type species
- †Cacibupteryx caribensis Gasparini, Fernández, & de la Fuente, 2004

Genus of rhamphorhynchid pterosaur from the Late Jurassic

Cacibupteryx is a genus of rhamphorhynchid pterosaur from the middle-late Oxfordian-age Upper Jurassic Jagua Formation of Pinar del Río, Cuba.

== Discovery and naming ==
The genus was named in 2004 by Zulma Gasparini, Marta Fernández and Marcelo de la Fuente. The type species is Cacibupteryx caribensis. The genus name is derived from Cacibu, the "Lord of the Sky" in Taíno and Greek pteryx, "wing". The specific name refers to the Caribbean, Caribe in Spanish.

The genus is based on holotype IGO-V 208, a partial but well-preserved uncrushed skull — missing the tip of the snout, teeth, and lower jaws — and fragmentary left wing: the distal end of the ulna, fragments of the radius, and the first and fourth phalanx of the wing finger. The partial skull is seventeen centimeters long (6.7 inches), is preserved in three dimensions, and has a broad roof. The wingspan and length were not estimated by the describers, but it was indicated to be a relatively large form.

== Classification ==
The describers assigned Cacibupteryx to the Rhamphorhynchidae. Although there is little overlapping material with contemporaneous Nesodactylus from the same location, the two are clearly different as proven by details of the elbow and quadrate. Cacibupteryx is one of the most complete Oxfordian pterosaurs, and demonstrates additional Oxfordian pterosaur diversity. Phylogenetic analyses have found it to be a member of the subfamily Rhamphorhynchinae, closely related to Rhamphorhynchus and Nesodactylus.

== See also ==
- List of pterosaur genera
- Timeline of pterosaur research
