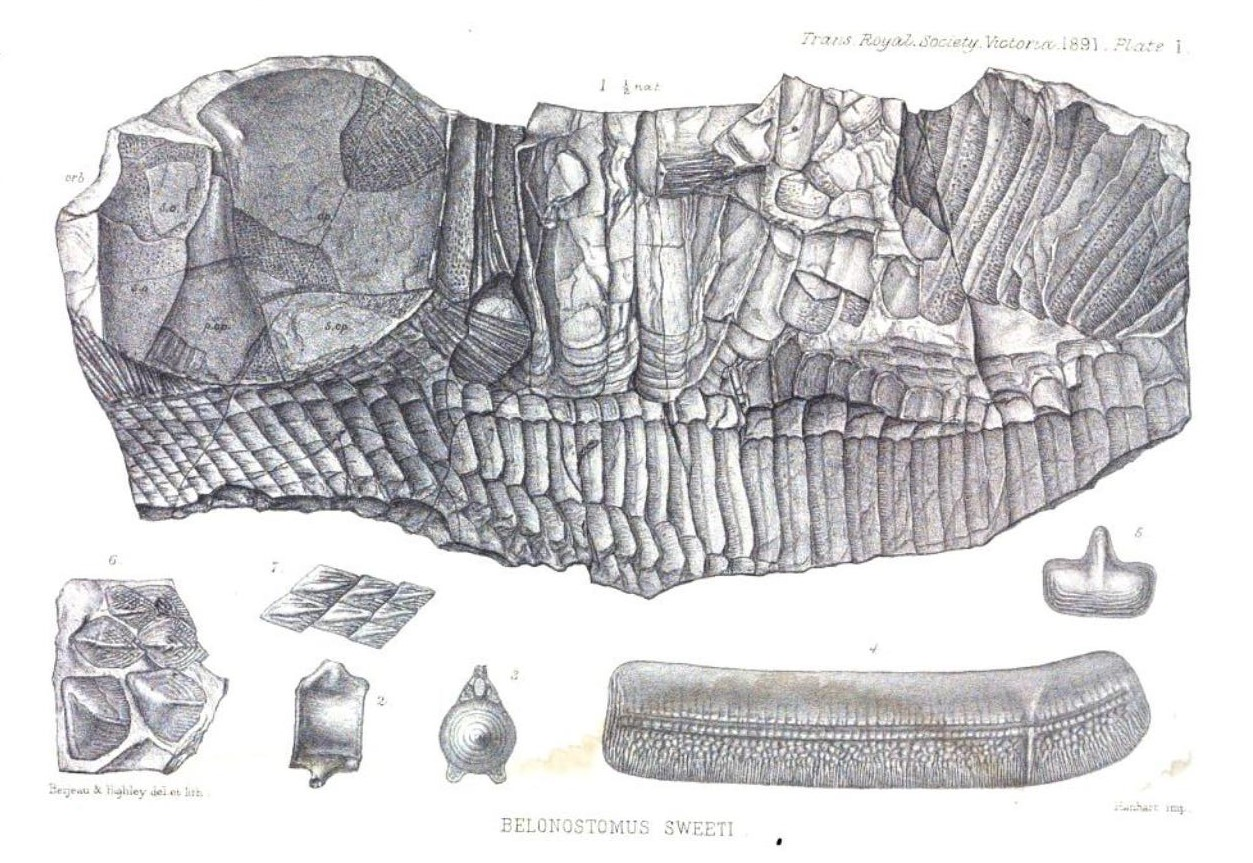
- Holotype specimen

Scientific classification
- Kingdom: Animalia
- Phylum: Chordata
- Class: Actinopterygii
- Order: †Aspidorhynchiformes
- Family: †Aspidorhynchidae
- Genus: †Richmondichthys; Bartholomai, 2004
- Species: †R. sweeti

Binomial name
- †Richmondichthys sweeti (Etheridge Jr. & Woodward, 1891)

Synonyms
- †Belonostomus sweeti Etheridge Jr. & Woodward, 1891; †Vinctifer sweeti (Etheridge Jr. & Woodward, 1891)

= Richmondichthys =

Richmondichthys Temporal range: Late Albian

Extinct genus of fishes

Richmondichthys is an extinct genus of large prehistoric marine ray-finned fish known from the Early Cretaceous. It contains a single species, R. sweeti from the late Albian-aged Allaru and Toolebuc Formations of Queensland, Australia.

At over 2 metres (6.6 ft) in length, it is the largest known member of the Aspidorhynchidae, a group of primarily marine ray-finned fishes that were dominant throughout the latter half of the Mesozoic. It was initially described as a member of the aspidorhynchid genus Belonostomus, with other fossil material being variously referred to Aspidorhynchus and Vinctifer, until it was described in its own genus in 2004, being named after the town of Richmond.

Richmondichthys differs from other aspidorhynchid genera both in its immense size, lack of a prominent rostrum, and the lack of teeth while having hinged cheek bones. The latter appears to be an adaptation to filter-feeding for a planktivorous lifestyle, suggesting that Richmondichthys fed either by gulping plankton or moving through plankton swarms while ballooning its cheeks, in contrast to the predatory nature of other aspidorhynchids. It was heavily armored, potentially as a defense against predatory reptiles and fish. Unlike other aspidorhynchid genera which are known to have had wide distributions, Richmondichthys appears to have been restricted to the Eromanga Sea.

In 2014, a complete specimen of Richmondichthys, nicknamed "Jeppy", was discovered near Marathon. Previously, the species was only known from skulls and fragmentary body remains. Following a decade of study, the fossil was returned to the Kronosaurus Korner museum in Richmond to be put on display.
