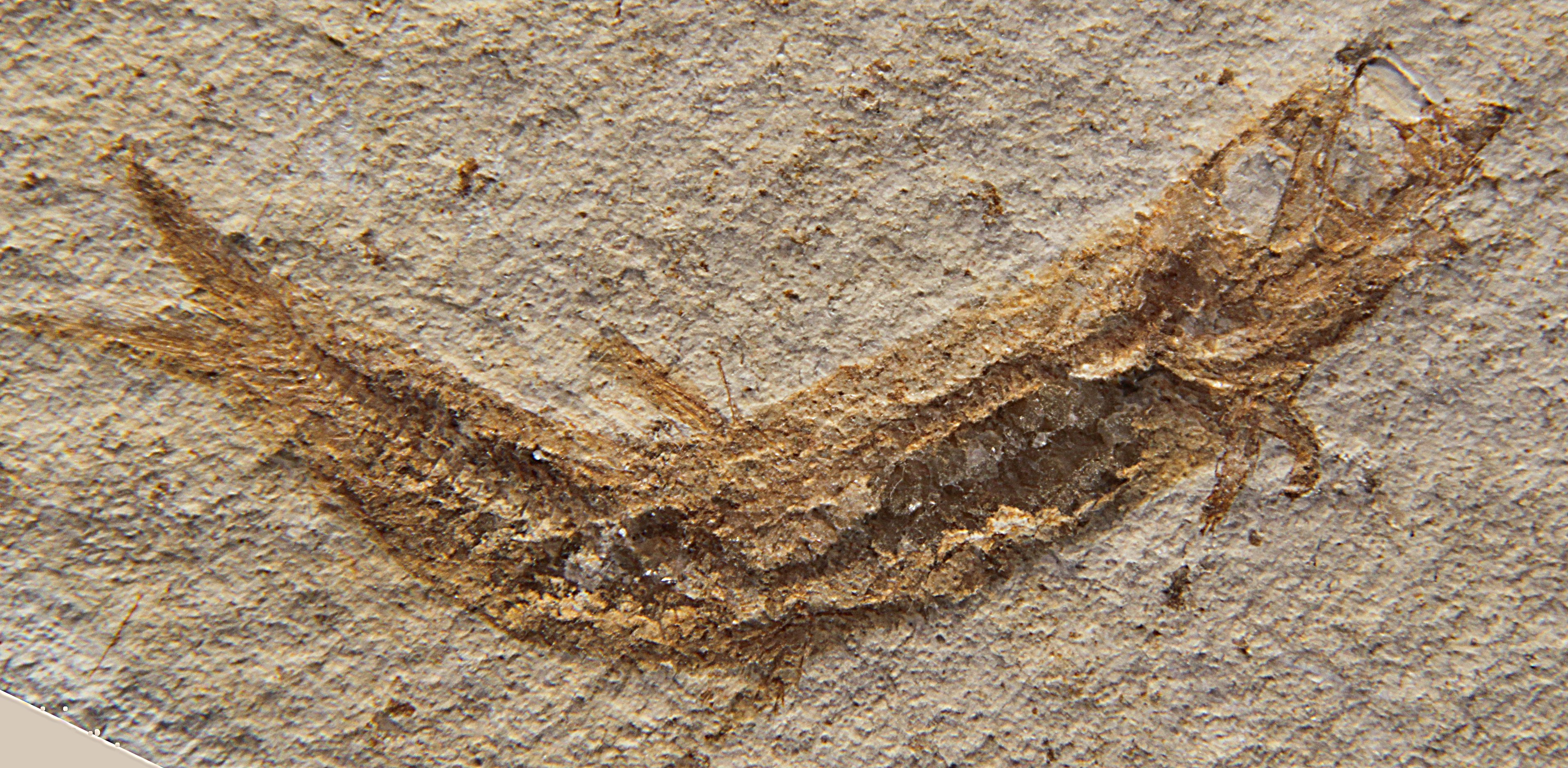
- Specimen of L. sprattiformis

Scientific classification
- Kingdom: Animalia
- Phylum: Chordata
- Class: Actinopterygii
- Division: Teleostei
- Family: †Orthogonikleithridae
- Genus: †Leptolepides; Nybelin, 1974

Type species
- †Clupea sprattiformis de Blainville, 1818

Species
- L. sprattiformis (de Blainville, 1818); L. haerteisi Arratia, 1997

= Leptolepides =

Leptolepides Temporal range: Kimmeridgian–Tithonian

Extinct genus of fishes

Leptolepides is an extinct genus of prehistoric marine ray-finned fish from the Late Jurassic of Europe.

Two species are known:

- †L. sprattiformis (de Blainville, 1818) - Tithonian of Germany (Altmühltal Formation of Solnhofen Limestone)
- †L. haerteisi Arratia, 1997 - Kimmeridgian to Tithonian of Germany (Torleite Formation of Solnhofen Limestone)

In addition, an indeterminate species of Leptolepides is known from the Kimmeridigian-aged Cerin Lagerstatte of France, with another also known from the similarly-aged Nusplingen Limestone of Germany.

A mass mortality layer of L. sprattiformis, Bürgermeister-Müller-Museum

Originally described in the genus Clupea (containing modern herrings), it was later moved to the stem group teleost Leptolepis, which was used to contain various small schooling Jurassic-aged fish from around the world, and retained in this genus for over a century. However, in 1974, it was found to represent a distinct taxon belonging to a different lineage of crown group teleosts potentially sister to the Euteleostei, and thus reclassified into its own genus. A second species was described in 1997.

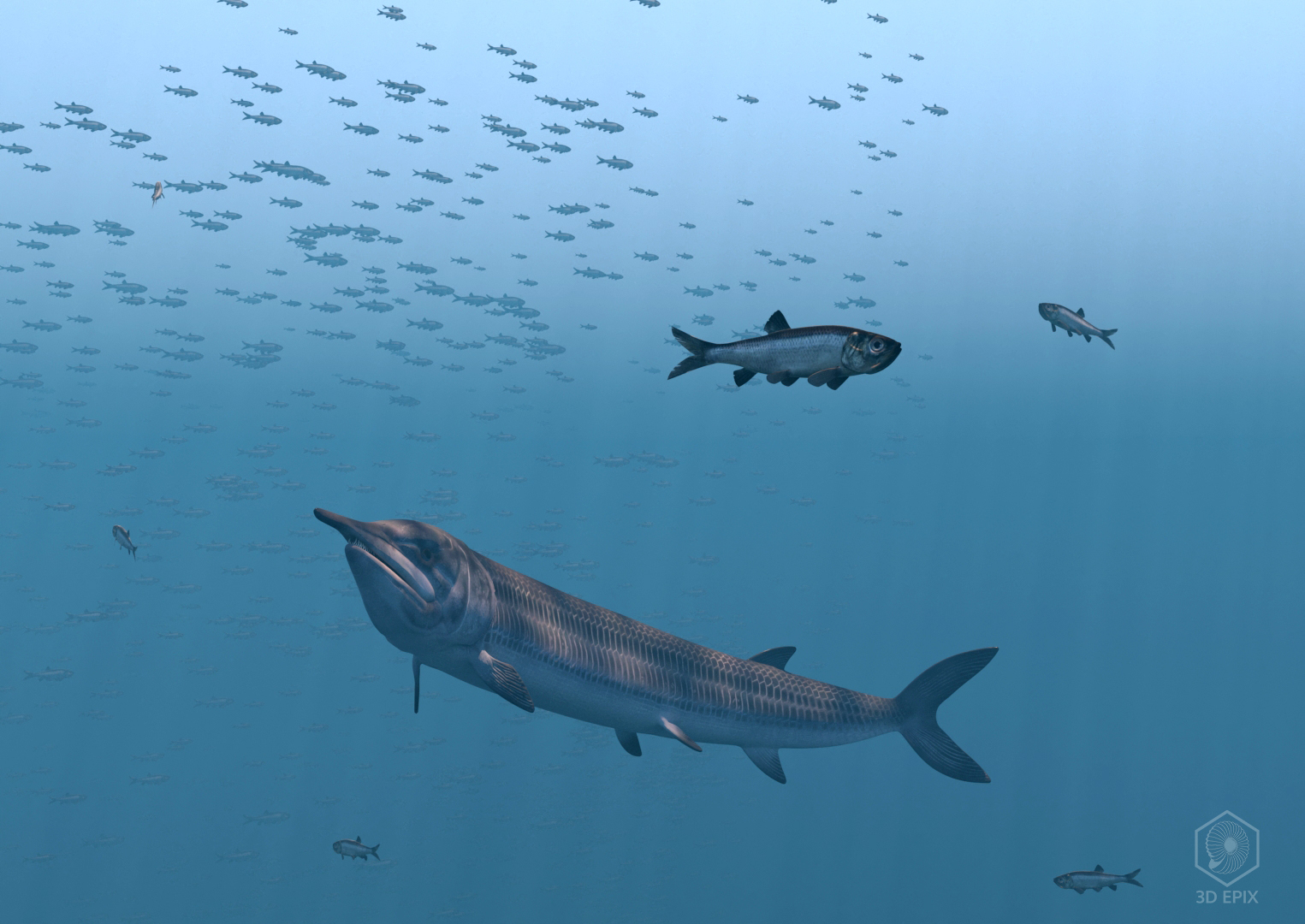
3D reconstruction of Leptolepides chased by Aspidorhynchus

Leptolepides was a small, planktivorous fish that formed massive schools, and is by far the most abundant vertebrate fossil in the Solnhofen, Cerin & Nusplingen limestones. It was one of two major bases of the Solnhofen Formation food chain, alongside Tharsis, another small schooling fish. Remains of Leptolepides have been identified in the stomachs of the fish Caturus, Thrissops, Allothrissops, and potentially Aspidorhynchus & Belonostomus, the cephalopods Plesioteuthis & Trachyteuthis, and potentially the pterosaur Rhamphorhynchus.

Leptolepides fossils are known to form large, exceptionally dense mass mortality layers, reaching densities of up to several hundred per square meter. It has been theorized that frequent tropical storms in the region led to a disruption of the pycnocline, causing Leptolepides schools to swim into hypersaline and deoxygenated waters, where they were killed and rapidly buried in sediment.

== See also ==
- List of prehistoric bony fish genera
