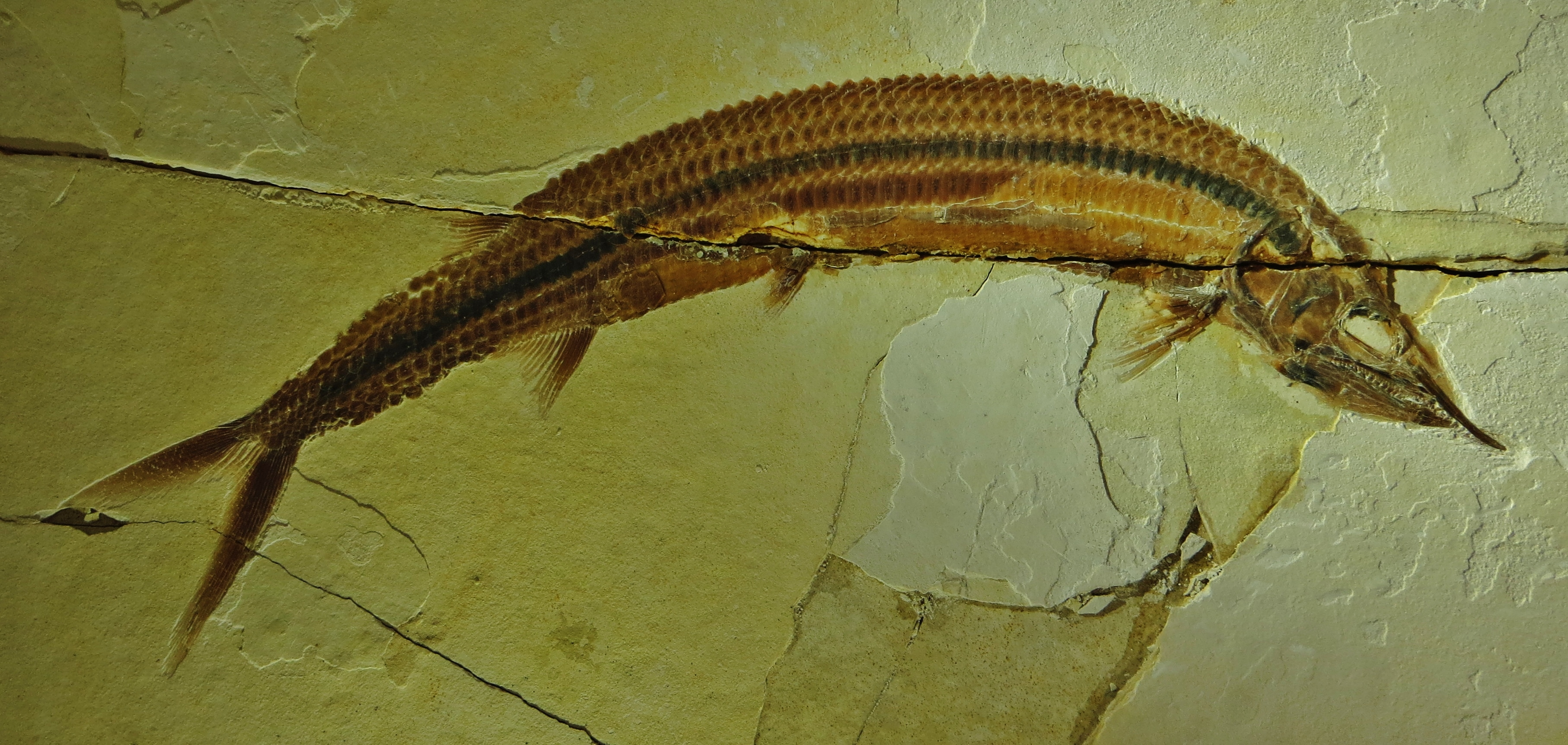
- Aspidorhynchus sanzenbacheri
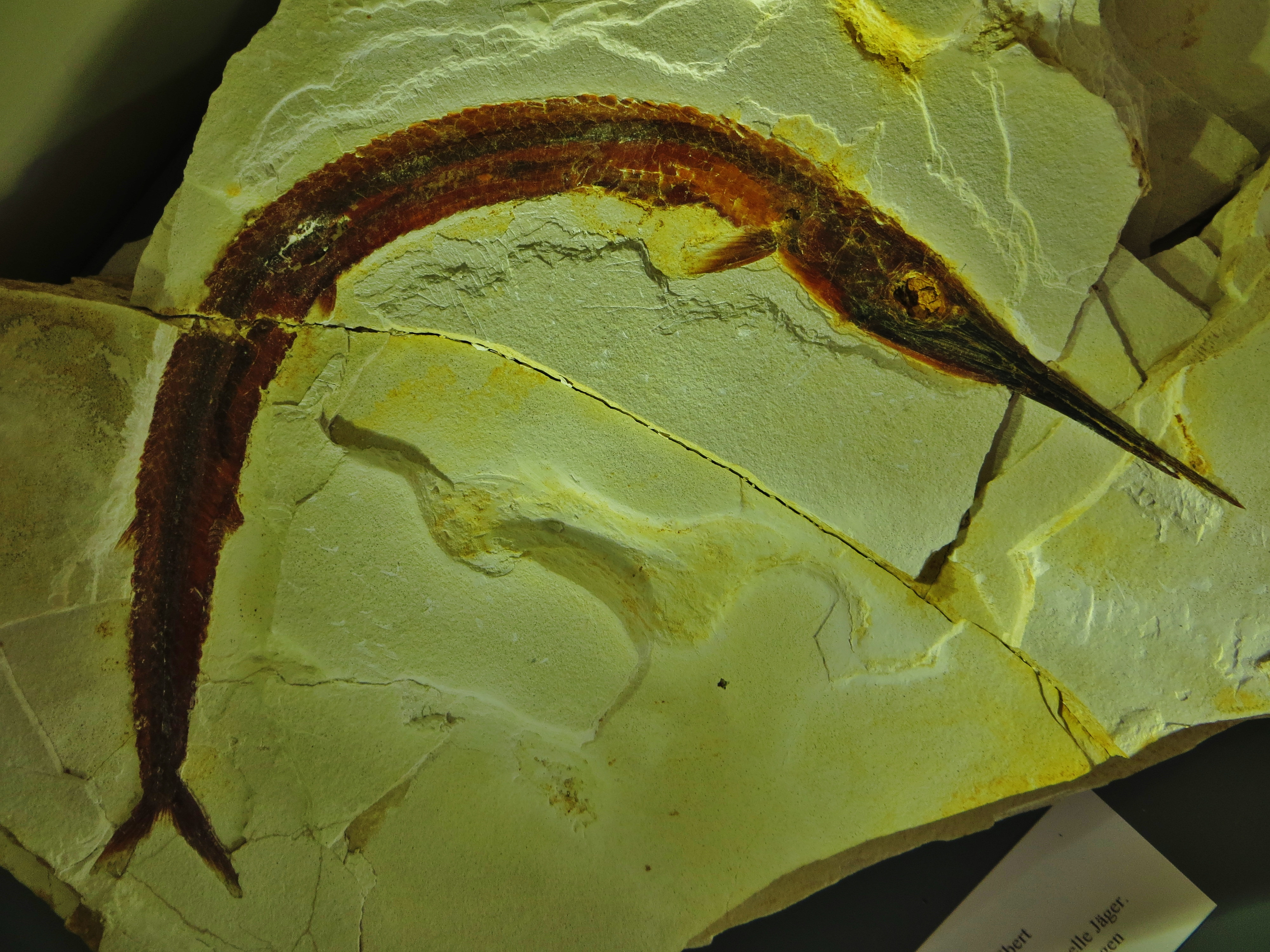
- Belonostomus kochii

Scientific classification
- Kingdom: Animalia
- Phylum: Chordata
- Class: Actinopterygii
- Division: †Aspidorhynchei
- Order: †Aspidorhynchiformes; Bleeker, 1859
- Family: †Aspidorhynchidae; Bleeker, 1859

Type genus
- †Aspidorhynchus Agassiz, 1833

Genera
- See text

= Aspidorhynchidae =

Aspidorhynchidae Temporal range: Middle Jurassic to Maastrichtian Possible Paleocene occurrence

Extinct family of ray-finned fishes

Aspidorhynchidae (from Ancient Greek ἀσπίς (aspís), meaning "shield", and ῥύγχος (rhúnkos), meaning "snout") is an extinct family of ray-finned fish from the Mesozoic Era. It is the only member of the monotypic order Aspidorhynchiformes. Members of the group are noted for their elongated, conical rostrums, of varying length, formed from fused premaxillae. The range of the group extends from the Middle Jurassic to the end of the Maastrichtian, with a potential record from the Late Paleocene. The family and order were described by Pieter Bleeker in 1859.

== Taxonomy ==
Aspidorhynchiformes have generally been recovered as basal members of Teleosteomorpha, more closely related to teleosts than to Holostei. They have often considered to have a sister group relationship with Pachycormiformes, another group of basal teleosteomorphs. However, other studies instead suggest that they successively diverged after one another, with the aspidorhynchids actually being closer to the teleosts than the pachycormids.

Aspidorhynchiformes has one family, which is divided into at least two genera:

- Order †Aspidorhynchiformes Bleeker 1859 [Aspidorhynchida; Aspidorhynchoidei Bleeker 1859]
  - Family †Aspidorhynchidae Bleeker 1859 [Vinctiferidae Silva Santos 1990; Diphyodontidae Jordan 1923]
    - Genus †Jonoichthys Gouiric-Cavalli 2015
    - Genus ?†Ophirachis Costa 1854
    - Genus †Platycerhynchus Costa 1864
    - Genus †Pseudovinctifer Arratia 2015
    - Genus †Richmondichthys Bartholomai 2004
    - Genus †Aspidorhynchus Agassiz 1833 non Fitzinger 1843
    - Genus †Belonostomus Agassiz 1834 [Dichelospondylus Costa 1856; Hemirhynchus Kner 1867 non Agassiz 1844 non Hodgson 1843; Diphyodus Lambe 1902]
    - Genus †Vinctifer Jordan 1920

=== Evolutionary history ===
The earliest known remains of the group are known from the Middle Jurassic of Europe, in what was then the western Tethys Ocean, which was likely the centre of their initial diversification; during the Late Jurassic they dispersed to the waters around the Caribbean, South America and Antarctica. During the Cretaceous they dispersed worldwide. Some members, like Belonostomus, attained a global distribution in both marine and freshwater habitats; others, like Vinctifer, were restricted to the seas around Gondwana, while others like the giant Richmondichthys were restricted to small geographic regions such as the Eromanga Sea.

The youngest members of the group, belonging to Belonostomus, went extinct at the end of the Maastrichtian during the K-Pg extinction. A specimen from the Late Paleocene of North Dakota suggests they may have persisted into the early Cenozoic, although this may have just been reworked from earlier formations.

== Anatomy ==
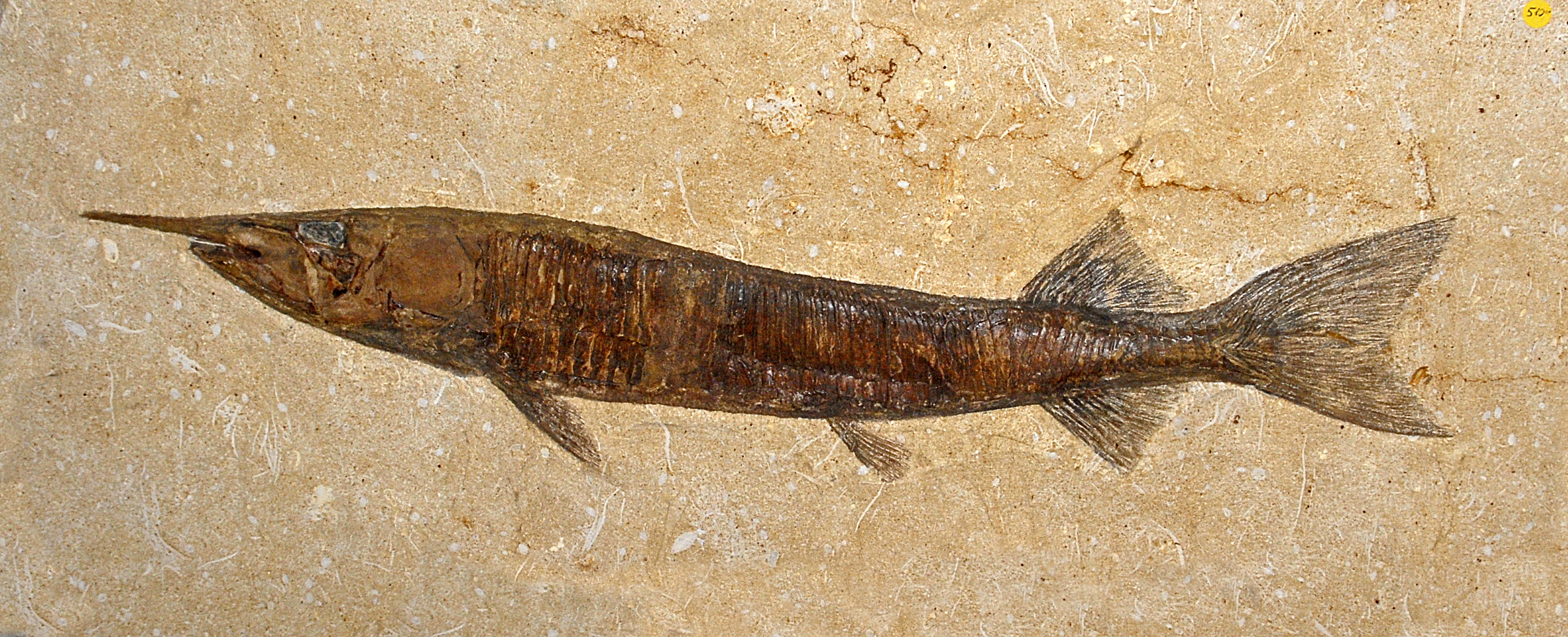
Fossil of Vinctifer comptoni

The most distinctive feature of the Aspidorhynchiformes are the elongated, tube-like rostrums, which are formed from fused premaxillary bones. The scales are lepidosteoid, similar to those of gars.

Most aspidorhynchids were predatory fish, which is best exemplified by fossils of Aspidorhynchus from Germany that have been found entangled with those of the pterosaur Rhamphorhynchus, which they appear to have attacked and died with. However, aspidorhynchids primarily fed on small fish and other vertebrates, with these attacks on pterosaurs appearing to be fatal mistakes. In contrast to other aspidorhynchids, the largest member of the family, the giant Richmondichthys from Australia, evolved clear adaptations for a planktivorous, filter-feeding lifestyle.
