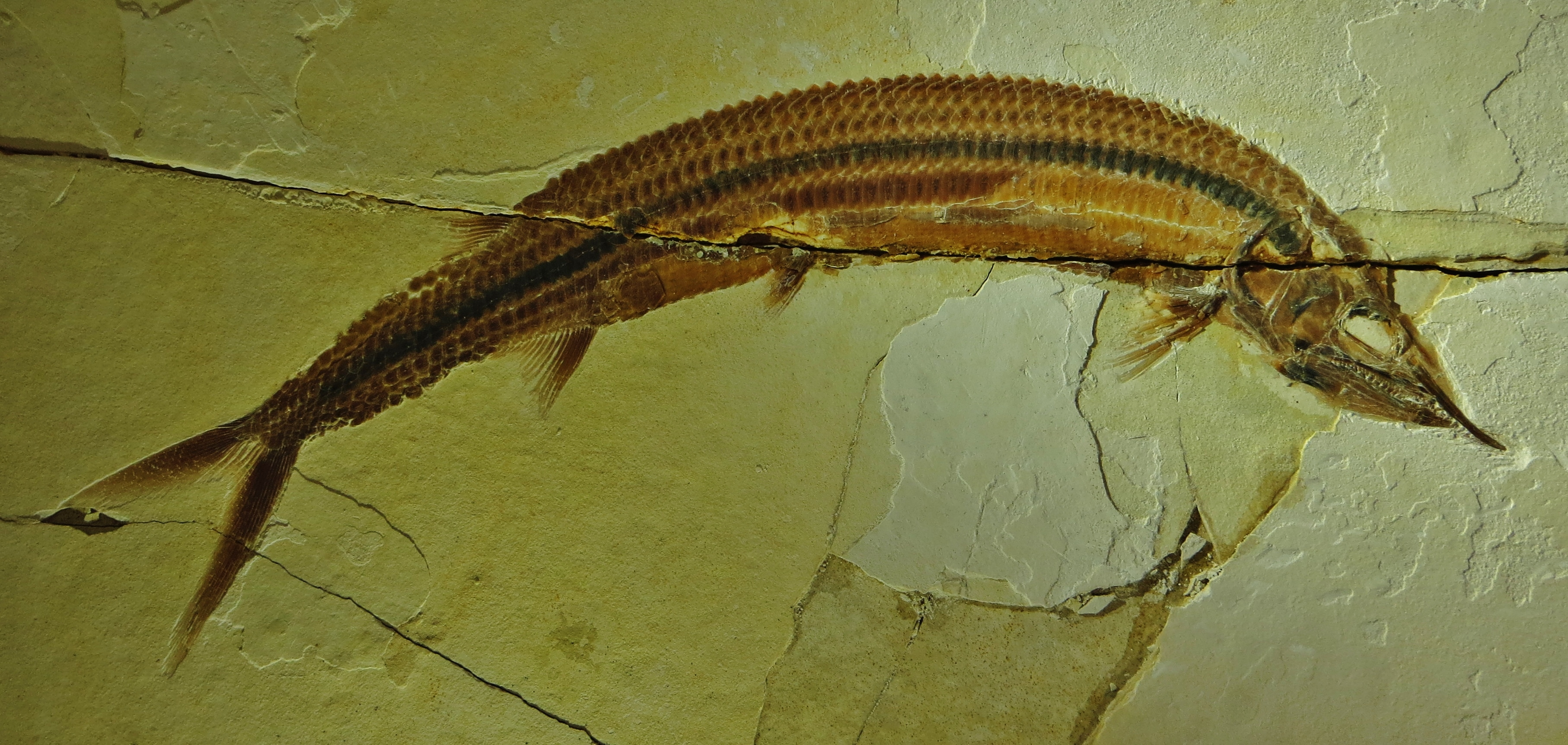
- Specimen of A. sanzenbacheri, Jura Museum

Scientific classification
- Kingdom: Animalia
- Phylum: Chordata
- Class: Actinopterygii
- Order: †Aspidorhynchiformes
- Family: †Aspidorhynchidae
- Genus: †Aspidorhynchus; Agassiz, 1833

Type species
- †Esox acutirostris de Blainville, 1818

= Aspidorhynchus =

Aspidorhynchus Temporal range: Middle Jurassic–Berriasian

Extinct genus of ray-finned fishes

Aspidorhynchus (from Ancient Greek ἀσπίς (aspís), meaning "shield", and ῥύγχος (rhúnkos), meaning "snout") is an extinct genus of predatory ray-finned fish from the Middle Jurassic to the earliest Cretaceous. Fossils have been found in Europe, Antarctica and the Caribbean.

Aspidorhynchus was a slender, fast-swimming fish, some species reach 85 centimetres (2.79 ft) long, with tooth-lined, elongated jaws. It also had heavy scales and a symmetrical tail. The upper jaw was longer than the lower jaw, ending in a toothless spike. Although it would have looked superficially similar to the present day gars, it was not related to them, belonging to the Aspidorhynchiformes, an extinct group of fish noted for their elongated rostrums. Aspidorhynchiformes are generally considered early relatives of teleosts.

== Taxonomy ==
Aspidorhynchus contains the following species:

- †A. acutirostris (de Blainville, 1818) (type species) - Kimmeridgian of Germany (Nusplingen Limestone) and France (paleontological site of Cerin)
- †?A. antarcticus Richter & Thompson, 1989 - Tithonian of James Ross Island, Antarctica (Ameghino Formation)
- †A. arawaki Brito, 1997 - Oxfordian of Cuba (Jagua Formation)
- †A. crassus Woodward, 1890 - Bathonian of England (Taynton Limestone Formation)
- †A. euodus Egerton, 1845 - Callovian of England (Oxford Clay)
- †A. fisheri Egerton, 1845 - Berriasian of England (Purbeck Group)
- †A. ornatissimus Agassiz, 1834 - Tithonian of Germany (Solnhofen Formation)
- †A. sanzenbacheri Brito & Ebert, 2009 - Tithonian of Germany (Solnhofen Formation)

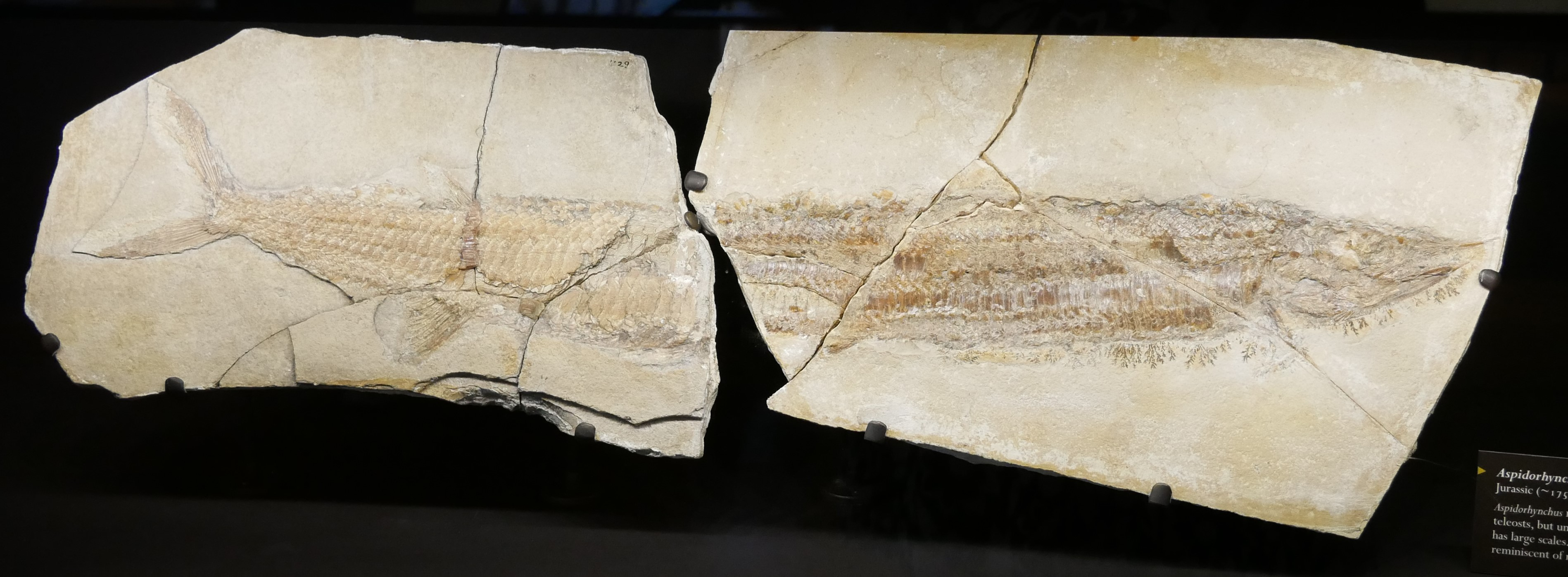
Specimen of A. acutirostris, Beneski Museum of Natural History

A. antarcticus is known from Jurassic remains reworked into the Albian Whisky Bay Formation, and was the oldest neopterygian fossil discovered in Antarctica at the time. However, some studies have instead classified it in Vinctifer, which was later also identified from the same formation. Other species previously classified in Aspidorhynchus, such as A. comptoni, have also since been moved to Vinctifer, whereas others have been moved to Belonostomus.

A potential species, A. montissancti Gorjanović-Kramberger, 1895 is known from the Cenomanian of Slovenia.

== Ecology ==
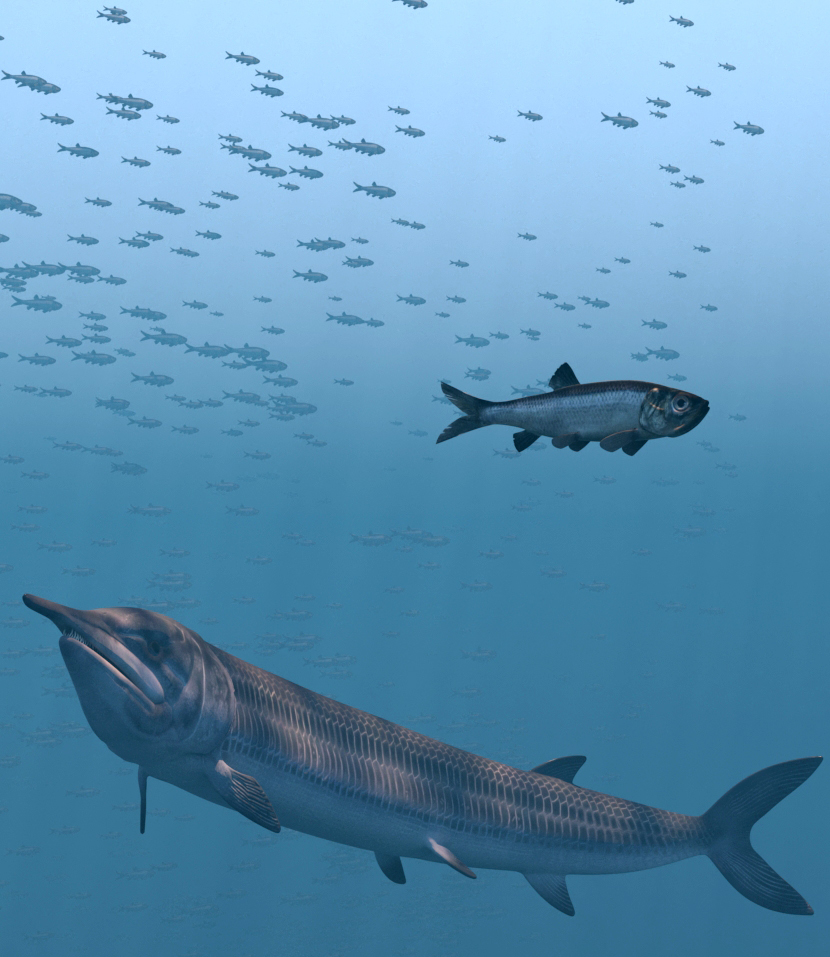
Life restoration of Aspidorhynchus (below) with Leptolepides

Aspidorhynchus is presumed to have fed mostly on other fish, with stomach and gut contents from the Upper Jurassic of Germany indicating that their diet included the smaller fish Leptolepides sprattiformis, Allothrissops, and probably Orthogonikleithrus francogalliensis. One specimen was found with a relatively large pholidophorid fish stuck within its mouth, which is thought to have caused its death. Aspidorhynchus likely also fed on crustaceans at least occasionally based on stomach contents, which in one specimen includes juvenile eryonids belonging to the genus Knebelia.

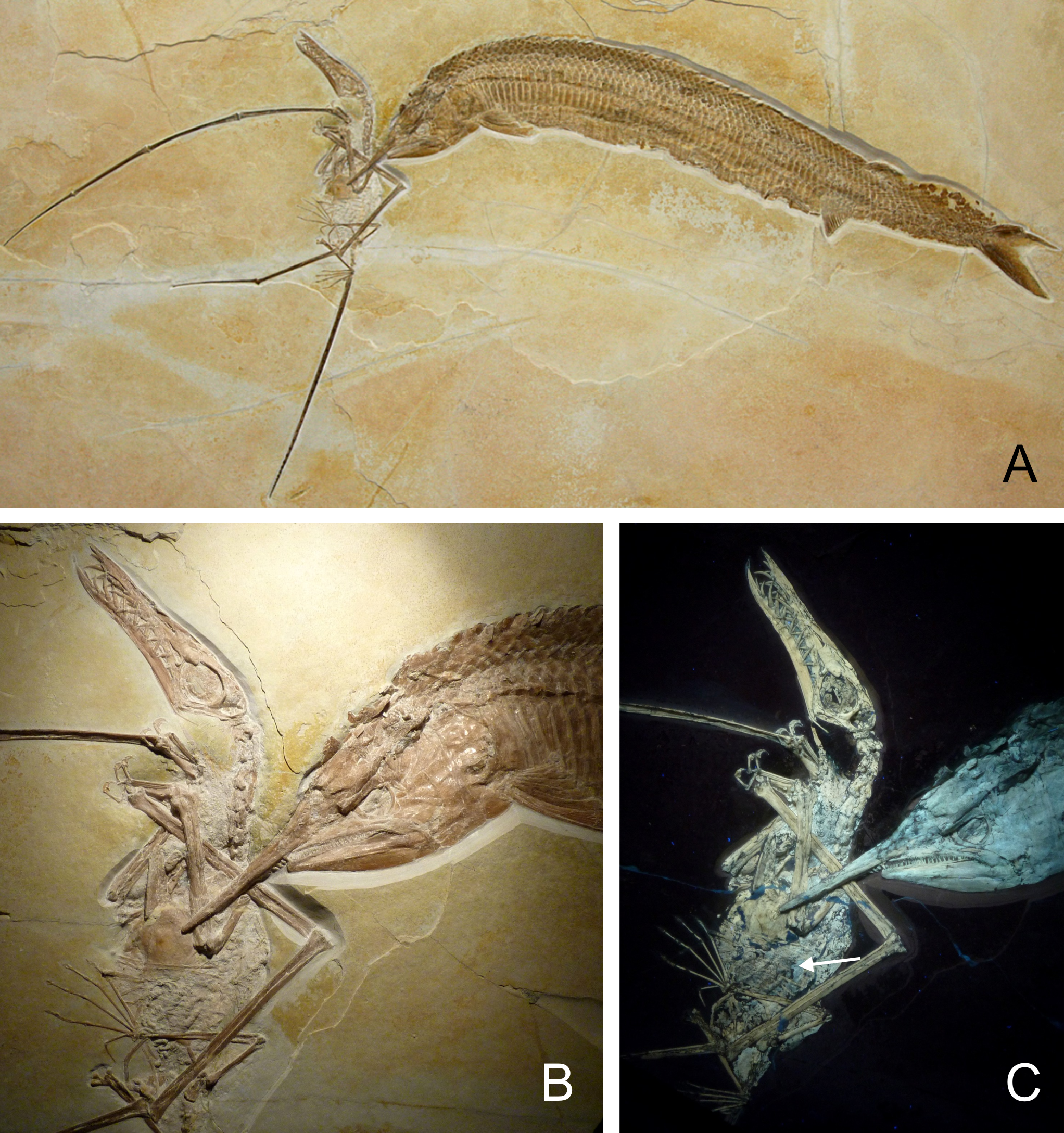
Fossil specimen WDC CSG 255, including a Rhamphorhynchus with a Leptolepides fish trapped in the pharynx and caught in the jaws of an Aspidorhynchus

Several limestone slabs have been discovered in which fossils of Rhamphorhynchus are found in close association with Aspidorhynchus. In one of these specimens, the jaws of an Aspidorhynchus pass through the wings of the Rhamphorhynchus specimen. The Rhamphorhynchus also has the remains of a small fish, possibly Leptolepides, in its throat. This slab, cataloged as WDC CSG 255, may represent two levels of predation; one by Rhamphorhynchus and one by Aspidorhynchus. In a 2012 description of WDC CSG 255, researchers proposed that the Rhamphorhynchus individual had just caught a Leptolepides while it was flying low over a body of water. As the Leptolepides was travelling down its pharynx, a large Aspidorhynchus would have attacked from below the water, puncturing the left wing membrane of the Rhamphorhynchus with its sharp rostrum. The teeth in its snout were ensnared in the fibrous tissue of the wing membrane, and as the fish thrashed to release itself the left wing of the Rhamphorhynchus was pulled backward into the distorted position seen in the fossil. The encounter resulted in the death of both individuals, most likely because the two animals sank into an anoxic layer in the water body, depriving the fish of oxygen. The two may have been preserved together as the weight of the head of the Aspidorhynchus held down the much lighter body of the Rhamphorhynchus.

A number of specimens of Aspidorhynchus from the Upper Jurassic of Europe have been found as isolated heads, sometimes with an attached gut tract. These specimens are suggested to represent evidence of predation, likely by ichthyosaurs, other marine reptiles, and sharks.
