= Jonoichthys =

Jonoichthys Temporal range: Tithonian

Scientific classification
- Domain: Eukaryota
- Kingdom: Animalia
- Phylum: Chordata
- Class: Actinopterygii
- Order: †Aspidorhynchiformes
- Family: †Aspidorhynchidae
- Genus: †Jonoichthys; Gouiric-Cavalli, 2015
- Species: †J. challwa

Binomial name
- †Jonoichthys challwa Gouiric-Cavalli, 2015

Extinct genus of ray-finned fishes

Jonoichthys is an extinct genus of marine ray-finned fish from the Upper Jurassic of Argentina. The type and only known species is Jonoichthys challwa. The fossil remains of J. challwa were recovered from the Vaca Muerta Formation, in Neuquén province, Argentina. It belongs to the family Aspidorhynchidae, within Aspidorhynchiformes.
