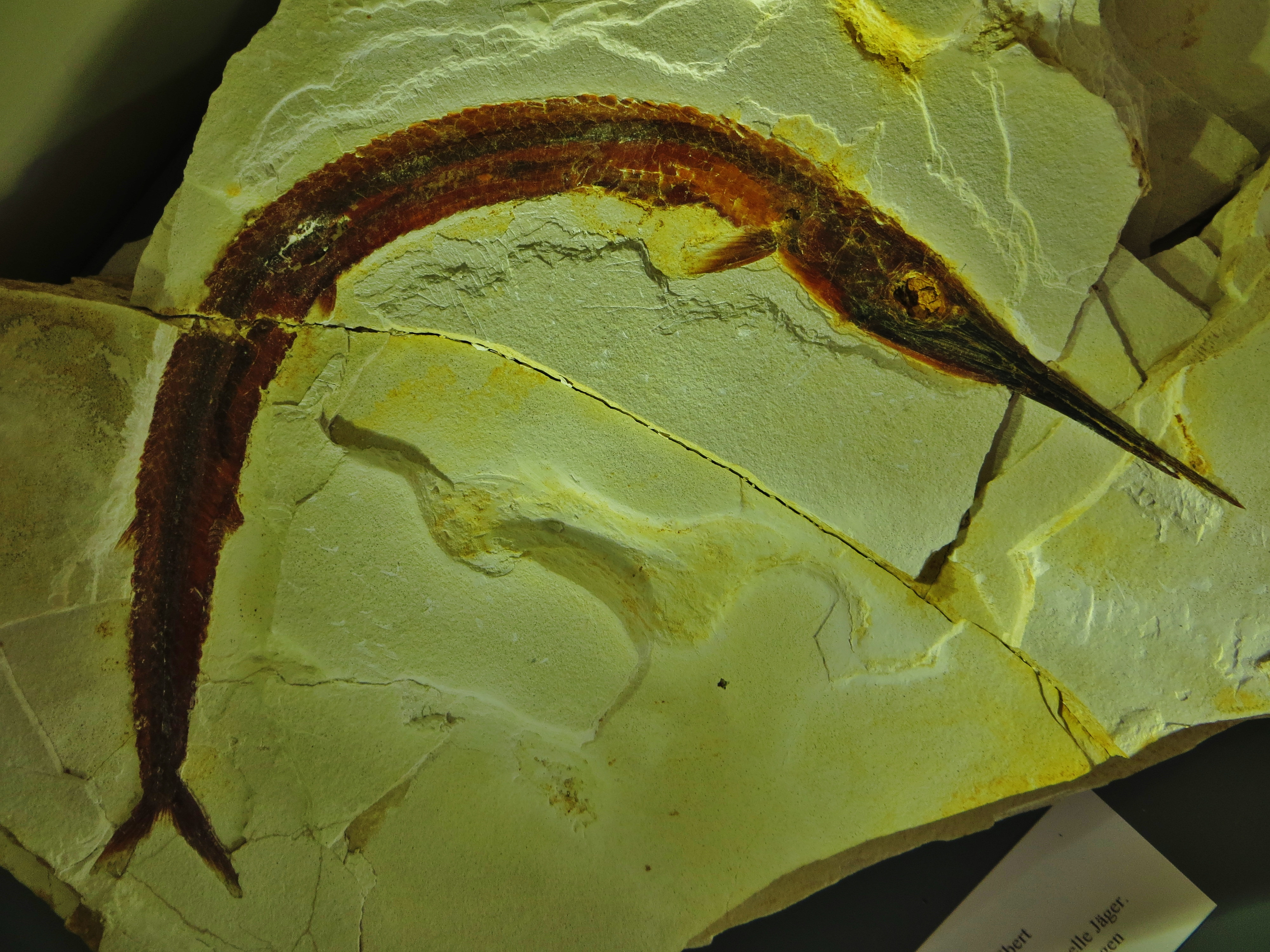
- Specimen of B. kochi, Jura Museum

Scientific classification
- Kingdom: Animalia
- Phylum: Chordata
- Class: Actinopterygii
- Order: †Aspidorhynchiformes
- Family: †Aspidorhynchidae
- Genus: †Belonostomus; Agassiz, 1834

Type species
- †Aspidorhynchus tenuirostris Agassiz, 1833

Species
- 30+, see text

Synonyms
- Diphyodus

= Belonostomus =

Belonostomus Temporal range: Bathonian–Maastrichtian Possible Paleocene record

Extinct genus of ray-finned fishes

Belonostomus (from Greek: βέλος belos, 'dart' and Greek: στόμα stóma 'mouth') is a genus of prehistoric ray-finned fish that was described by Louis Agassiz in 1844. It is a member of the order Aspidorhynchiformes, a group of fish known for their distinctive elongated rostrums.

Fossils of Belonostomus have been found worldwide in marine deposits, although some species are known from freshwater habitats. The oldest known species are from the Upper Jurassic of Germany and England, with the youngest known species from the late Maastrichtian. One specimen has been recovered from the late Paleocene-aged Tongue River Member of North Dakota, which would suggest that this genus was the only aspidorhynchean to survive into the Cenozoic, although it is possible this fossil may have been reworked from earlier formations.

It likely consumed plankton or other small fish, though one specimen from the Late Jurassic of Germany was found with the rhynchocephalian Homoeosaurus as stomach contents.

== Taxonomy ==
Known Belonostomus species are:

- B. aciculiferus Nessov, 1985 - Turonian of Uzbekistan (Bissekty Formation)
- B. attentuatus Dixon, 1850 - Cenomanian of England (English Chalk) (nomen dubium)
- B. cinctus Agassiz, 1837 - Cenomanian of England (English Chalk) and Italy (Scaglia Rossa Formation)
- B. comenianus (Kner, 1867) - Cenomanian of Slovenia (Komen Limestone) (syn: Hemirhynchus comenianus Kner, 1867)
- B. crassirostris Costa, 1853 - Cenomanian of Morocco (Jbel Tselfat) and Italy (Pietraroja Plattenkalk)
- B. dalmaticus Gorjanović-Kramberger, 1895 - Cenomanian of Croatia
- B. dorsetensis Woodward, 1895 - Kimmeridgian of England (Kimmeridge Clay)
- B. helgolandicus Taverne & Ross, 1973 - Aptian of Germany
- B. hooleyi Woodward, 1916 - Barremian of England (Wealden Formation)
- B. genevensis (Pictet, 1858) - Early Cretaceous of Switzerland (Voirons Flysch) (syn: Aspidorhynchus genevensis Pictet, 1858) (nomen dubium)
- B. kochi Agassiz, 1843 - Tithonian of Germany (Solnhofen Limestone) (syn: B. kocki Agassiz, 1843)
- B. lamarquensis Bogan et al., 2011 - Campanian/Maastrichtian of Argentina (Allen Formation)
- B. leptosteus Agassiz ex Egerton, 1836 - Bathonian of England (Stonesfield Slate) (nomen dubium)
- B. lesinaensis Bassani, 1882 - Cenomanian of Croatia and Slovenia (Komen Limestone) (possibly synonymous with B. crassirostris) (syn: Hemirhynchus heckelii Kner, 1867)
- B. longirostris Lambe, 1902 - Santonian to late Maastrichtian of the Americas, including Alberta & Saskatchewan, Canada (Milk River Formation, Belly River Group and Frenchman Formation), Montana, North Dakota & Wyoming, US (Mesaverde, Judith River, Lance, and Hell Creek Formations), Argentina (Allen Formation), and Chile (Quiriquina Formation)
- B. marquesbritoi Taverne & Capasso, 2012 - Campanian/Maastrichtian of Italy (Calcare di Melissano Formation)
- B. matteuzi Gorjanović-Kramberger, 1895 - Cenomanian of Slovenia
- B. muensteri Agassiz, 1844 - Tithonian of Germany (Solnhofen Limestone) (syn: B. speciosus Wagner, 1863)
- B. novaki Gorjanović-Kramberger, 1895 - Cenomanian of Croatia
- B. ornatus Felix, 1891 - Berriasian of Mexico (Sabinal Formation) (nomen dubium)
- B. sphyraenoides Agassiz, 1844 - Tithonian of Germany (Solnhofen Formation) (syn: B. brachysomus Agassiz, 1837, B. angustus zu Münster ex von Leonhard & Bronn, 1842)
- B. tenuirostris (Agassiz, 1833) - Tithonian of Germany (Solnhofen Formation) and France (paleontological site of Cerin) (type species) (syn: Aspidorhynchus tenuirostris Agassiz, 1833, B. subulatus Agassiz, 1834, B. ventralis Agassiz, 1834)

Indeterminate remains are known from worldwide, including the Gulf Coast of the United States (Alabama, Arkansas, and Texas), Australia, Belgium, Lebanon, and Russia.

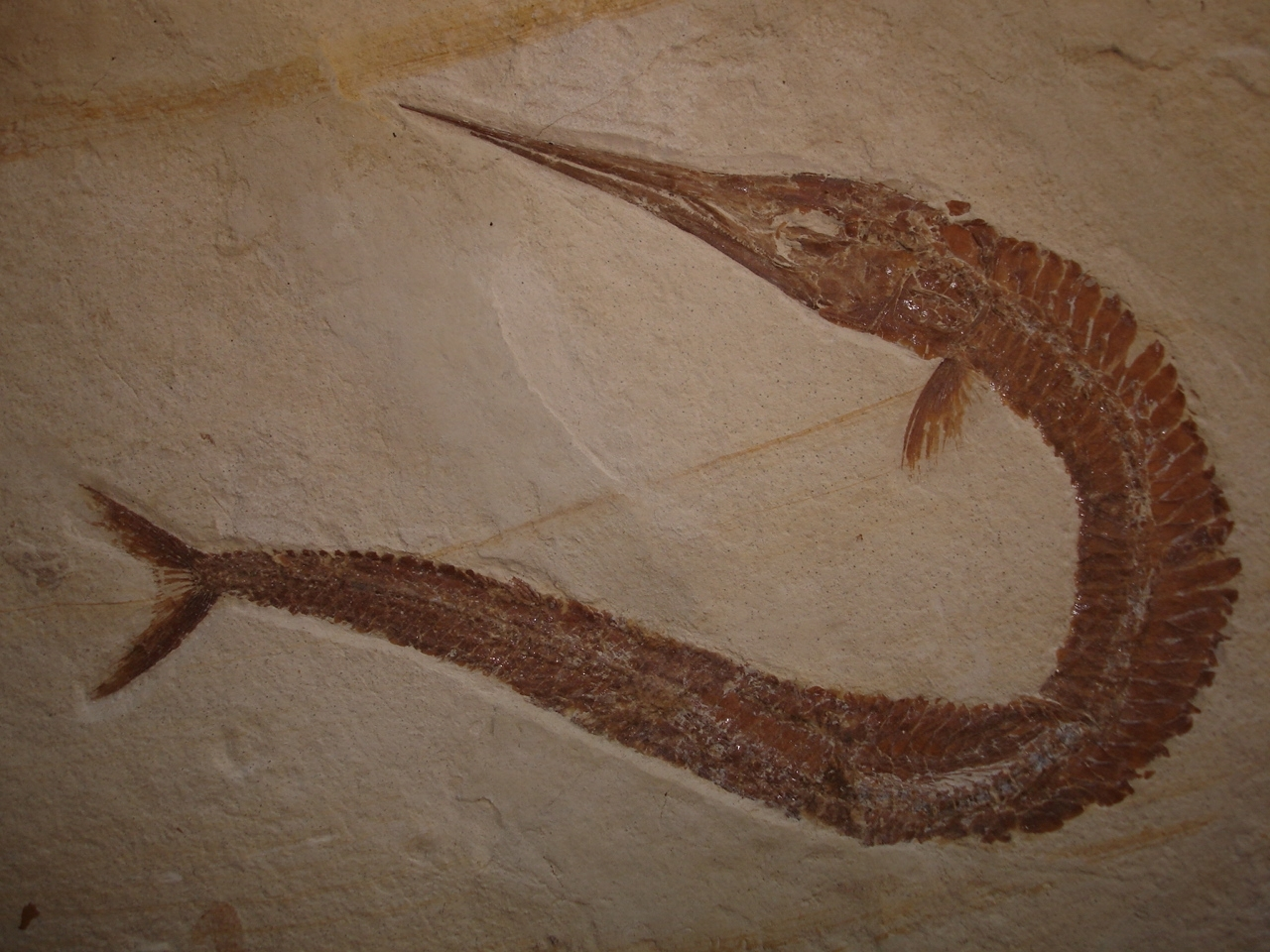
†B. tenuirostris (Agassiz, 1835) from the Jurassic of Painten, Germany

The former species B. acutus Agassiz, 1844 (syn: B. tenellus Agassiz ex Egerton 1841) and B. anningiae Agassiz, 1843 from the early-mid Jurassic of England are now thought to be species of the unrelated saurichthyiform Saurorhynchus. The former species B. carinatus Mawson and Woodward, 1907 from the Hauterivian of Brazil is now thought to be a stem-gar in the family Obaichthyidae. The former species B. indicus Woodward, 1890 is now thought to be a true gar, Lepisosteus indicus. The former species B. microcephalus Winkler, 1862 from the Tithonian of Germany is now thought to be a junior synonym of Aspidorhynchus acustirostris, while B. flexuosus Philips, 1871 is one of A. crassus. The former species B. sweeti Etheridge & Woodward, 1892 is now placed in Richmondichthys. The former species B. pygmaeus Winkler, 1874 from the Tithonian of Germany is thought to be an immature specimen of one of the other Solnhofen Belonostomus species.
