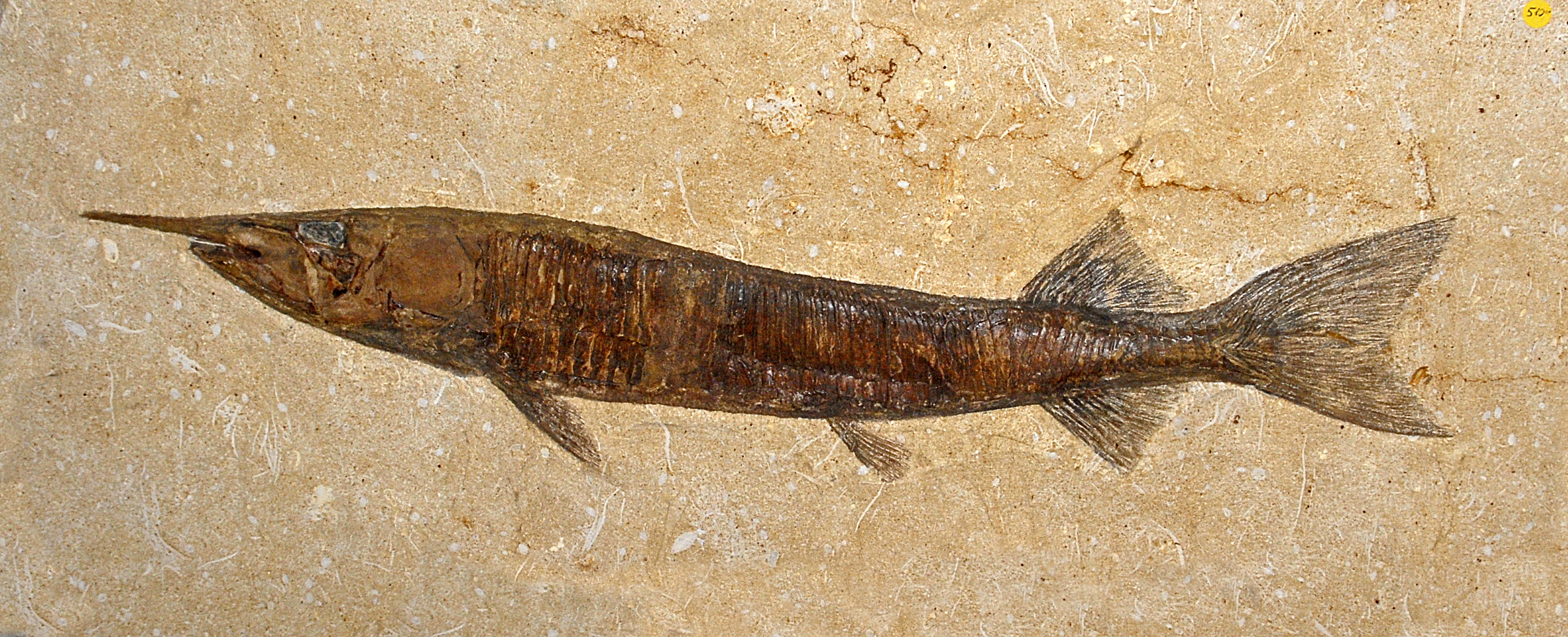
- Fossil of Vinctifer comptoni

Scientific classification
- Kingdom: Animalia
- Phylum: Chordata
- Class: Actinopterygii
- Order: †Aspidorhynchiformes
- Family: †Aspidorhynchidae
- Genus: †Vinctifer; Jordan, 1919

= Vinctifer =

Vinctifer Temporal range: Kimmeridgian-Aptian ~150.8–109.0 Ma

Extinct genus of fishes

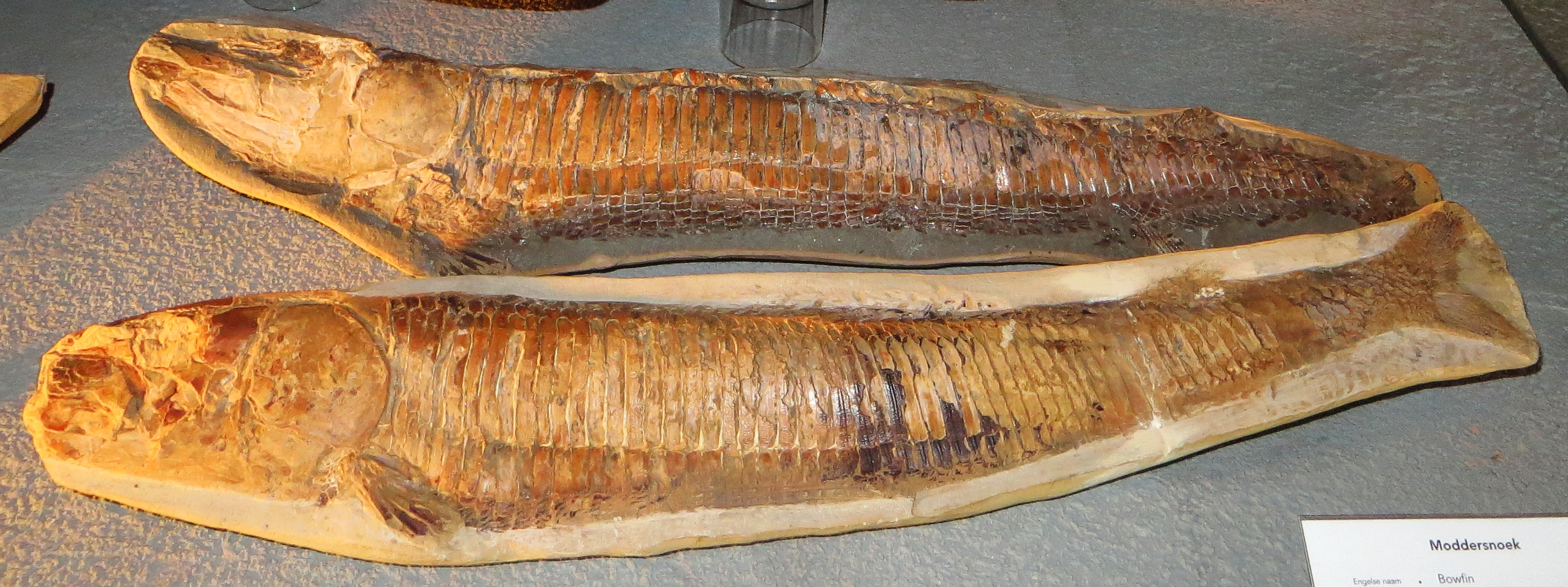
Vinctifer comptoni

Vinctifer is an extinct genus of prehistoric bony fish erected by David Starr Jordan in 1919.

== Fossil record ==
This genus is known in the fossil record from the Late Jurassic (Kimmeridgian) to the Aptian stage of the Early Cretaceous epoch (age range: from 150.8 to 109.0 million years ago.). Fossils within this genus have been found in the Marizal, Romualdo and Missão Velha Formations of Brazil, Tlayua Formation of Mexico, Apón Formation of Venezuela and Nordenskjöld Formation of Antarctica.

== Species ==
Three species have been described:

- Vinctifer comptoni Agassiz 1834
- Vinctifer ferrusquiai Cantalice, Alvarado-Ortega & Brito 2018
- Vinctifer longirostris Silva Santos 1972
